= Enidzhevardar revolutionary district of IMARO =

IMRO Enidzhevardar Revolutionary District
- Ениджевардарски революционен район (Bulgarian)
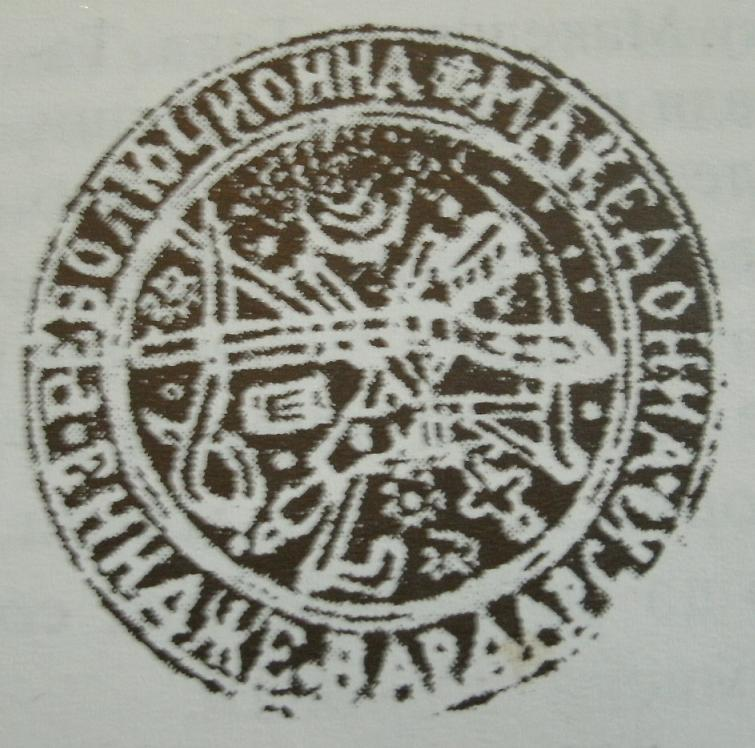
- Seal of main district voyvode Apostol Petkov
- Founders: Dame Gruev; Apostol Petkov
- Leader: Apostol Petkov
- Founded: 1897; Yenice-i Vardar, Salonika Vilayet, Ottoman Empire (now Giannitsa, Greece)
- Dissolved: 1934
- Allegiance: Kingdom of Bulgaria
- Active regions: Around Yenice-i Vardar, Salonica Vilayet, Ottoman Empire
- Ideology: Macedonia for the Macedonians
- Part of: Internal Macedonian Revolutionary Organization

The Enidzhevardar Revolutionary District of the greater Salonica Revolutionary Region of Internal Macedonian Revolutionary Organization was an area of operations within Ottoman Empire around the town of Yenice-i Vardar (modern Giannitsa, Greece). The region was relatively well-organized for revolutionary actions and participated in the Ilinden Uprising, though in limited numbers, leaving it relatively undamaged from the uprising and free from Ottoman reprisals. During the most intense years of the Macedonian Struggle between 1904 - 1908, the wider region of Yenice-i Vardar became the main battleground between rival Bulgarian and Greek chetas (warbands).

== Enidzhevardar Revolutionary District ==
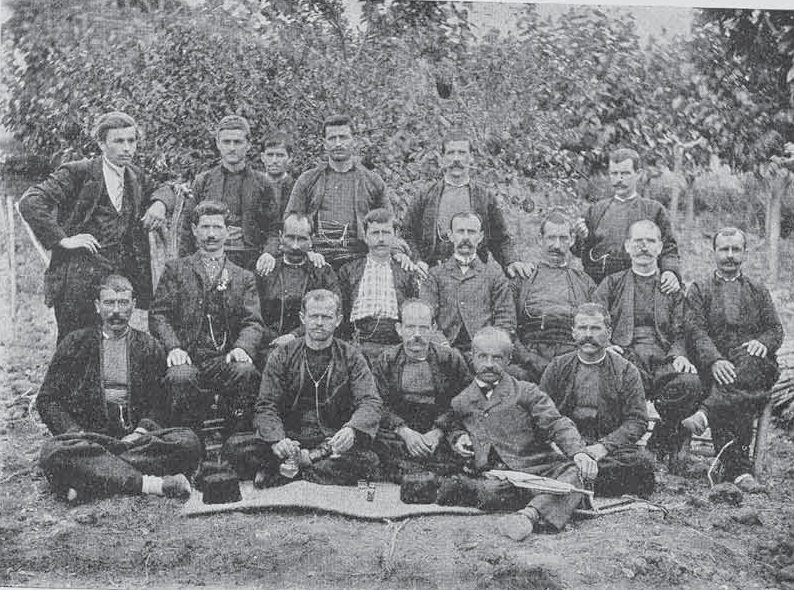
Photo of the Yenice-i Vardar IMRO committee between 1898 and 1901, published by the magazine Ilustration Ilinden in June 1934, standing from left to right: Pere Toshev (more probably Dame Gruev), Stanko Popstankov, Dime Tortopov, unknown, after him Nikola Hadzhiivanov and Hristo Litovoycheto. Second row, sitting: Teofile, Andon Popstavrev, Tomo Tushiyanov, Harish Bozhkov, Georgi Harizanov, Mite Popstavrev, Lyubishanov. Third row, sitting: Mite Chobanov, Mile Kayafov, Georgi Pophristov, Hadzhi Dionis (Hadzhi Dala) and Hristo Todev.

The emergence of organized chetnik actions occurred in 1897, when Dame Gruev undertook a tour of the Enidzhevardar region and founded local committees, he swore in former bandits such as Apostol Petkov, Ivancho Karasuliyata, and Spiro Karasulski among others. To raise discipline in 1898, the agitation and organizational detachment of Mihail Apostolov - Popeto arrived in the district, which toured the Kukush region, and then the Enidzhevardar and Gevgeli regions.

Several affairs broke out successively in the region and the district. These were the Enidzhevardar Affair from the summer of 1900, the Bayaltsi Affair, and the Thessaloniki Affair from the beginning of 1901, which had an impact against the more mass organization of the population in the Enidzhevardar region. Followed by the Gevgeli Affair from the beginning of 1902 and the Machukovo Affair from October 1902, which caused more destruction to the organizational network in the Thessaloniki revolutionary region.

In mid-1902, the SMAC detachments of Anastas Yankov, Toma Pozharliev, Ivan Pozharliev, Atanas Ordzhanov, Ivan Karasuliyski and others arrived to commence an uprising. The activists of the IMARO foiled their attempts, some of the detachments were disarmed, and so the Gorna Dzhumaya Uprising did not reach Enidzhevardar region. The same year, a small-scale Thessaloniki Congress was held, and at the congress in January 1903, a decision was made for a general uprising, which was not attended by the most prominent activists of IMARO.

== Ilinden Uprising ==
According to the main plan of Hristo Matov for the upcoming uprising First Thessaloniki revolutionary region is to be split into two - „Belasitsa“ and that one, formed by Enidzhevardar district together with Gevgeli, Voden (Edessa) and Tikvesh districts - called „Kozhuh“. Preparations for an uprising in the Thessaloniki District began immediately after the Sofia Conference of IMARO in January 1903.

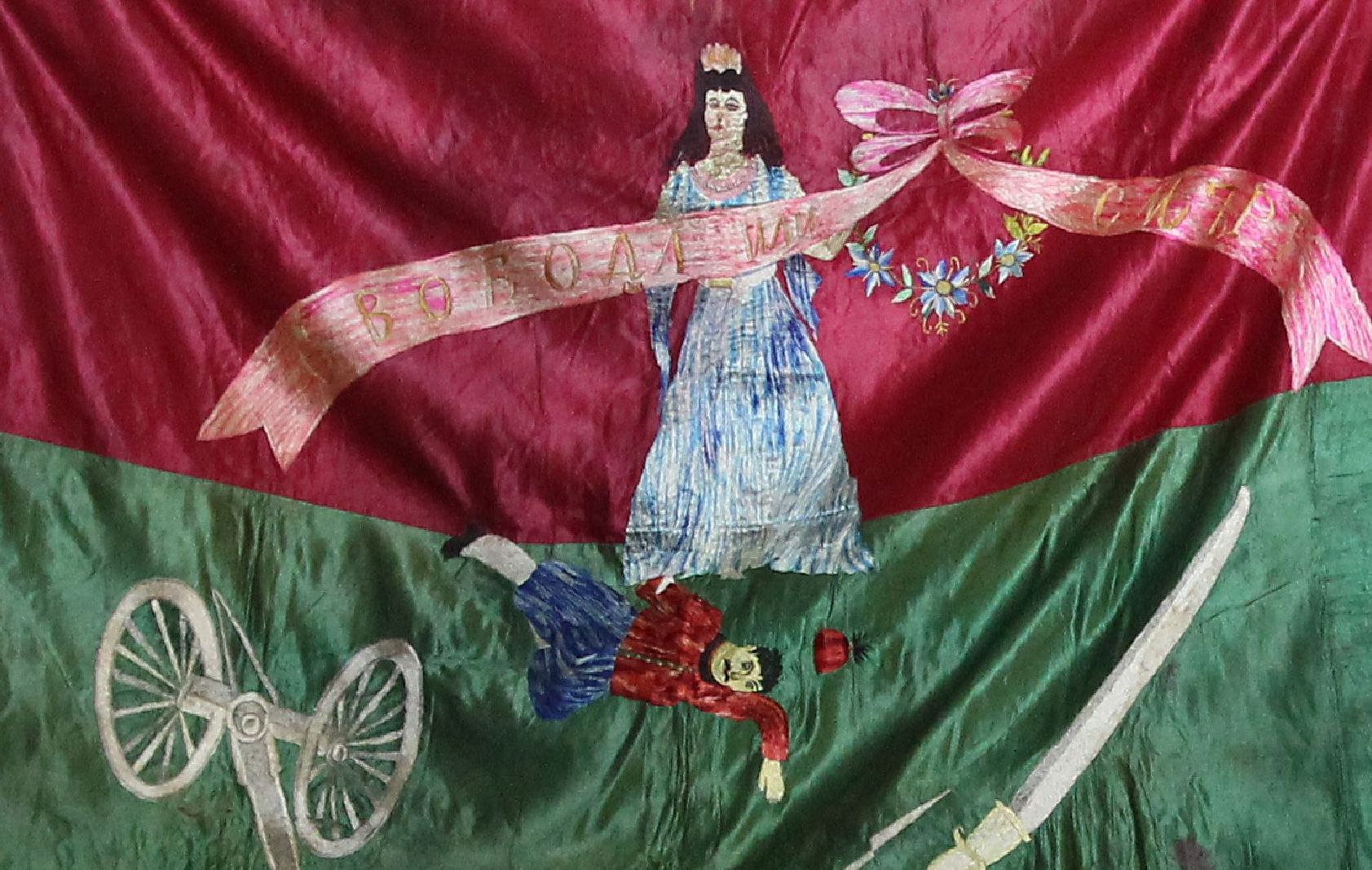
The flag of Giannitsa district. The flag was sewn by the teacher Maria Kapitancheva in the winter of 1903 on the instructions of Apostol Petkov. It represents a sewn red and green cloth with a girl standing in front of a killed Turkish soldier, with the inscription above her "Svoboda ili smart". On the reverse side is the motto "Be brave, people, God is with us" on an Orthodox cross. After the Ilinden Uprising, the flag was saved by priest Dimitar Dzhutev and today it is in Sofia Military Museum.

In Enidzhevardar region, Apostol Petkov fought a battle near Boymitsa (Axiopouli) on February 23, 1903, and Ivan Karasuliyski killed Greek spies in Babyani (Lakka) on April 17, 1903. Krustyo Asenov crossed into their area and, together with the detachments of Apostol Petkov and Trayko Gyotov, fought a battle at Postol (Pela), after which the detachments of Krustyo Asenov and Apostol Petkov met with that of Ivan Karasuliyski in Kornishor (Kromni). There, on July 20, the revolutionary flag was lit and the uprising began. Krustyo Asenov was killed after arbitrariness on July 25, 1903, on the orders of Gone Beginin. On July 28, Apostol Petkov passed through Kriva (Griva), then fought near Ramna (Omalo) and withdrew to Payak mountain. On September 12, the united detachment of Apostol Petkov and Ivan Karasuliyski fought battle on Gundach Peak with a regular Turkish army from Gumendze and Gevgelija. After that, Apostol Petkov fought a battle on Gola Chuka Peak, and in November 1903, the insurgent activity in the entire region was stopped.

== Intensification of Greek Efforts ==
After the suppression of the Ilinden Uprising, Greek efforts intensified, with coordination from the Greek Consulate of Thessaloniki).

The Greek Defense Committee of Giannitsa was led by Antonios Kasapis (chairman), Christos Didaskalou (treasurer), and priest Dimitrios Oikonomou (secretary). There was also Ioannis Papavasiliou – Sfetsos, a secret organizer of Greek efforts in the town.Kasapis, Didaskalou, and Oikonomou were all killed by the IMRO in targeted attacks in 1904, 1907, and 1909 respectively. Further killings ensued including Kasapis' daughter Velika Roma in Pilorik (1903), Christos Didaskalou near Gyupchevo (1907), Christos Hatzidimitriou in the town's market square (17 July 1905), Dionysios Samoladas (1904), Aristeidis Dovantzis (1905), Dionysios Tsakmakis (1905), Ioannis Karabatakis with his niece (1906), Stavros Mitzouris (1906), Athanasios Oikonomou (1906), and Athanasios Organtzis (1906).

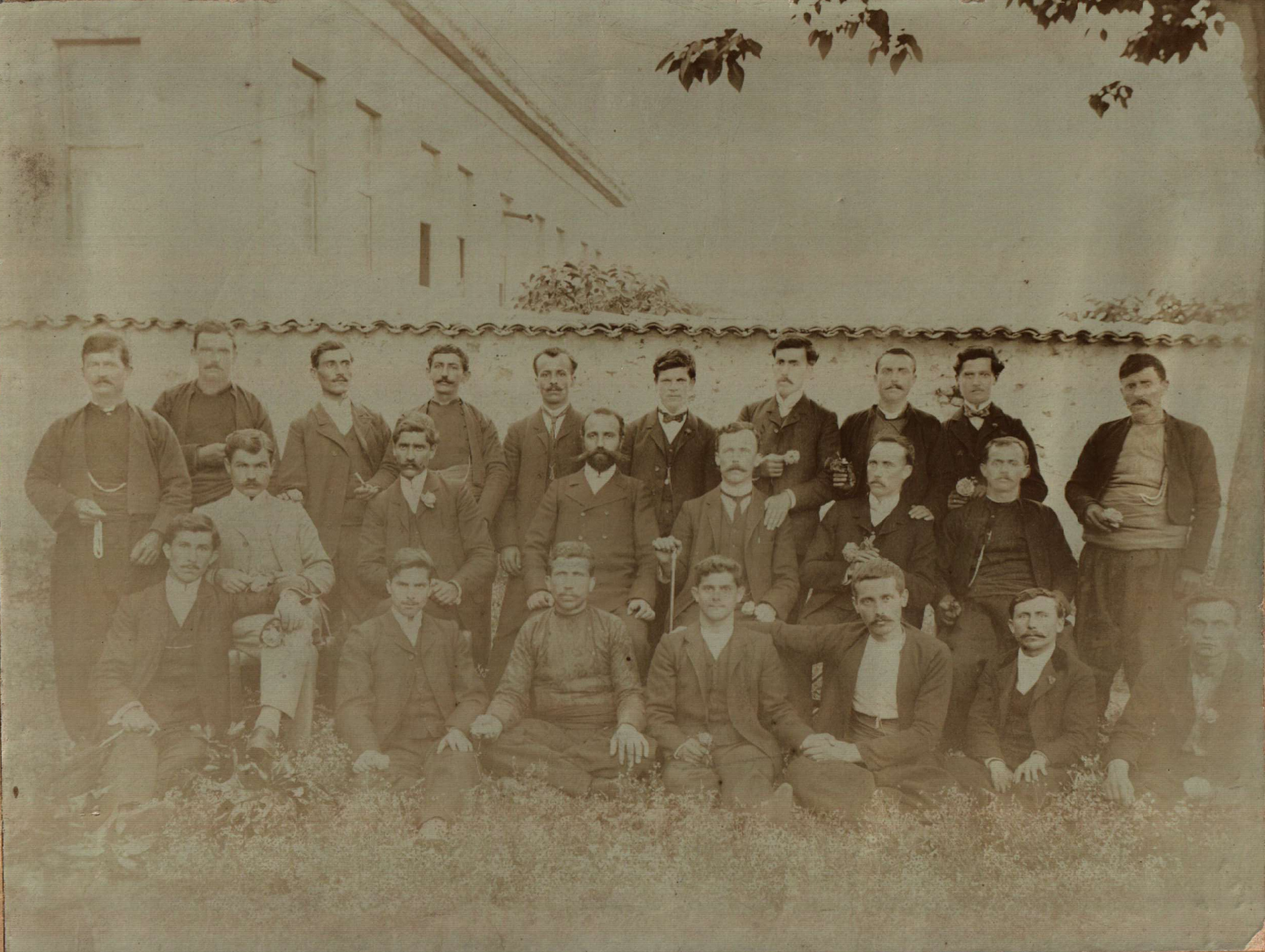
Bulgarian revolutionary committee in Yenice-i Vardar in beginning of the 20th century (11 May 1906): First row sitting from left to right: Dimitar Karabashev, teacher; Pencho Kavrakirov, teacher from Thessaloniki; Grigor Tomov Fotselarov, native; Toma Kostadinov Grkov, native; Hristo Srbov Hristov, taylor; Hristo Ponchanov (Chaponoto), trader from Giannitsa, Tyufekchiyata; second row from left to right: Hristo Hadzhi Koychev, native, Anton Krivoto, teacher; Pampulov, chairman of the commettee, teacher from Kyustendil; Mihail Kayafov, trader from Giannitsa; third row from left to right: Petar Genchanov, local trader; Ivan Tenekidzhiyata, local trader; Mitso Petrov Shemov, local teacher; Ivan Hristov Mandalchev, local trader; Ivan Hadzhi Kostov, local teacher; Todor Nikezov, local teacher; Mihail Kozhuharov, local cart driver

Greek units were soon organized to protect their villages and interests in the Enidzhevardar region and, in October 1904, the first detachment of Gonos Yiotas began operations. He cooperated with the units of Tellos Agras, Ioannis Demestihas, Konstantinos Mazarakis, Lazos Dogiamas and many others. Greek units were able to establish many bases of operations in the Giannitsa Lake, where they fought many battles with the detachment of Apostol Petkov. Their efforts attracted the villages of Petrevo (Petrusia), Ramel (Rahona) and Zorbatovo (Mikro Monastiri) back to the Greek Patriarchate. The situation worsened and violence grew, leading to Ramel and Nisi (Nision) were burned down.

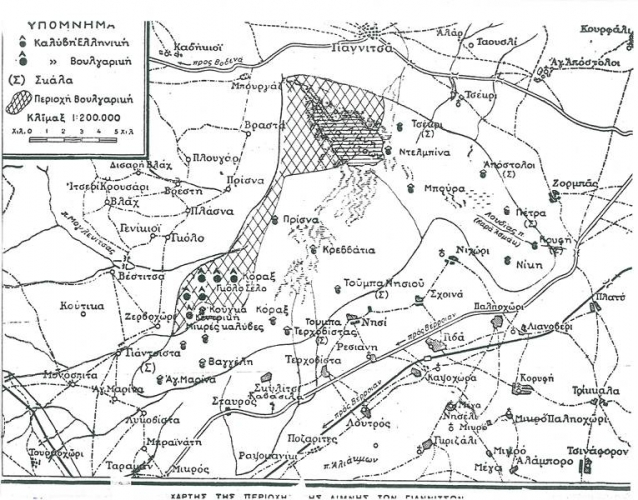
Greek map with the location of both Bulgarian and Greek forts in Giannitsa lake

To help the IMARO detachments, Aromanian ("Vlach") detachments arrived in the region, such as that of Mihail Handuri. In the summer of 1907, together with Ivan Zlatanov and Georgi Kasapcheto from Mesimer or Ioryi Mucitano – Kasapcheto, he met with Tellos Agras and Antonios Mingas, who tried to lure them to the Greek side and break the Aromanian–Bulgarian alliance in Enidzhevardar. The Makedonomachoi were captured and hanged a few days later.

== Bulgarian Bases of Operations ==
In this time, the Giannitsa Lake remained the main base of Apostol Petkov, called by the local Bulgarian population "Sun of Enidzhe Vardar". In 1907, the joint pressure of Greek units and the Ottoman Army forced the Bulgarians to leave the lake area. IMARO bases were: Alonaki, Itia, Slivitsa, Algana, Port Arthur, Zhervohor, Korchuka and Golo Selo, which was the headquarters of Apostol Petkov.

In a very short time in the spring of 1905, the Gevgelija revolutionary district was almost defeated. The detachments of Sava Mihaylov, Apostol Voivoda (without him himself), Ivancho Karasuliyski and Leonid Yankov were destroyed, while the main regional voivode Argir Manasiev was in Bulgaria recruiting weapons. The Matsanova Affair and Gumendzhenska Affair scandals broke out in the spring and summer of 1906, during which the Ottoman authorities arrested great number of IMARO activists in the region.

The Enidzhevardar Revolutionary Committee was composed of Tomo Tushiyanov, Mile Pophristov, Georgi Harizanov, Georgi Pophristov, Dimitar Karabashev and Petar Hadzhirindov (replaced after his exposure by Mihail Kayafov). Gradually, the town organization and church institutions in Enidze Vardar tried to seize the leadership of the revolutionary region from Apostol Petkov, for which he threatened the chairman of the Enidze Vardar Bulgarian Church Municipality Nikola Shkutov with murder.

== The Young Turk Revolution and subsequent wars ==
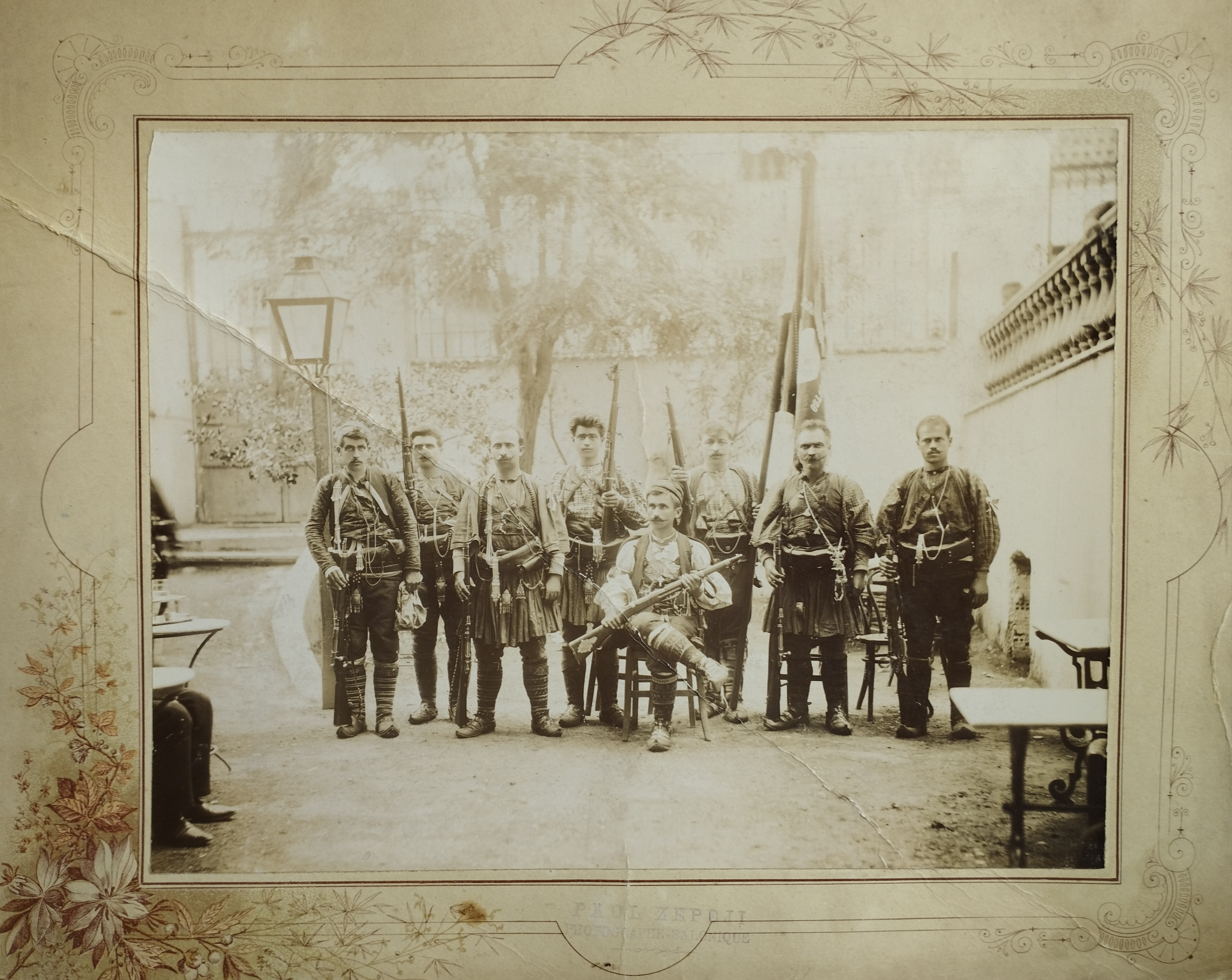
Apostol Petkov (in the middle) with his chiftains after the Youngturks revolution. From his right is Vando Gyoshev and from left - Stoyan Hadzhiev.

In July 1908, the Young Turk Revolution was declared, after which many guerillas from both sides disarmed with the promise of amnesty. In 1910, the Young Turk regime carried out operations to disarm the remaining guerillas in the region, in which many former komitadjis of the IMARO were arrested and/or tortured. Apostol Petkov went underground again in this time and together with Ioryi Mucitano and Vasil Pufkata, began the restoration of revolutionary activity through the new organization BPMARO. They were killed 1911 following a betrayal by Theodoros Tsiftes, whose true allegiance was to the Greek cause. They were replaced by Ichko Dimitrov and Vando Gyoshev.

At the outbreak of the First Balkan War in late 1912, 74 people from Enidze Vardar volunteered in the Macedonian-Adrianopolitan Volunteer Corps. The komitadjis of the district supported the efforts of the Bulgarian Army in the Balkan Wars. In November 1912, in the Battle of Yenidje, the Greeks inflicted the final defeat on the Ottoman forces in Southern Macedonia, which led to the fall of Thessaloniki. As a result of massive artillery shelling, the Turkish quarters and the barracks in the town were burned down. After the territories of the district fell within the borders of Greece, the voivodes Vendo Gyoshev, Dimitar Robkov and others were killed, with many sympathizers arrested, tortured, or killed. At the beginning of Second Balkan War, many komitadjis were exiled by the Greek authorities to Paleo Trikeri, a small island used to hold Bulgarian prisoners captured during the Second Balkan War.

During World War I, the detachment of Hristo Zinov – Zinata, composed of deserters from the Greek Army, appeared in Enidzhe Vardar district.

== Sources ==
- Бабев, Иван, „Македонска голгота – Спомени и изповеди от Ениджевардарско“, ТАНГРА ТанНакРа ИК, София, 2009.
- Бабев, Иван (2013). Помним делата ви. НСА Прес.
- „Из революционните борби в Ениджевардарското блато“, спомени на Стоян Хаджиев, публикувани в сп. „Илюстрация Илинден“, книга 38, 40, 41, София, 1930 г.
- „Резолюция на Учредителното събрание на Българската Народна Македоно-Одринска Революционна Организация“, София, 4 май 1910 година
