= Rusinovo =

Village in eastern North Macedonia

Rusinovo Русиново
- Village
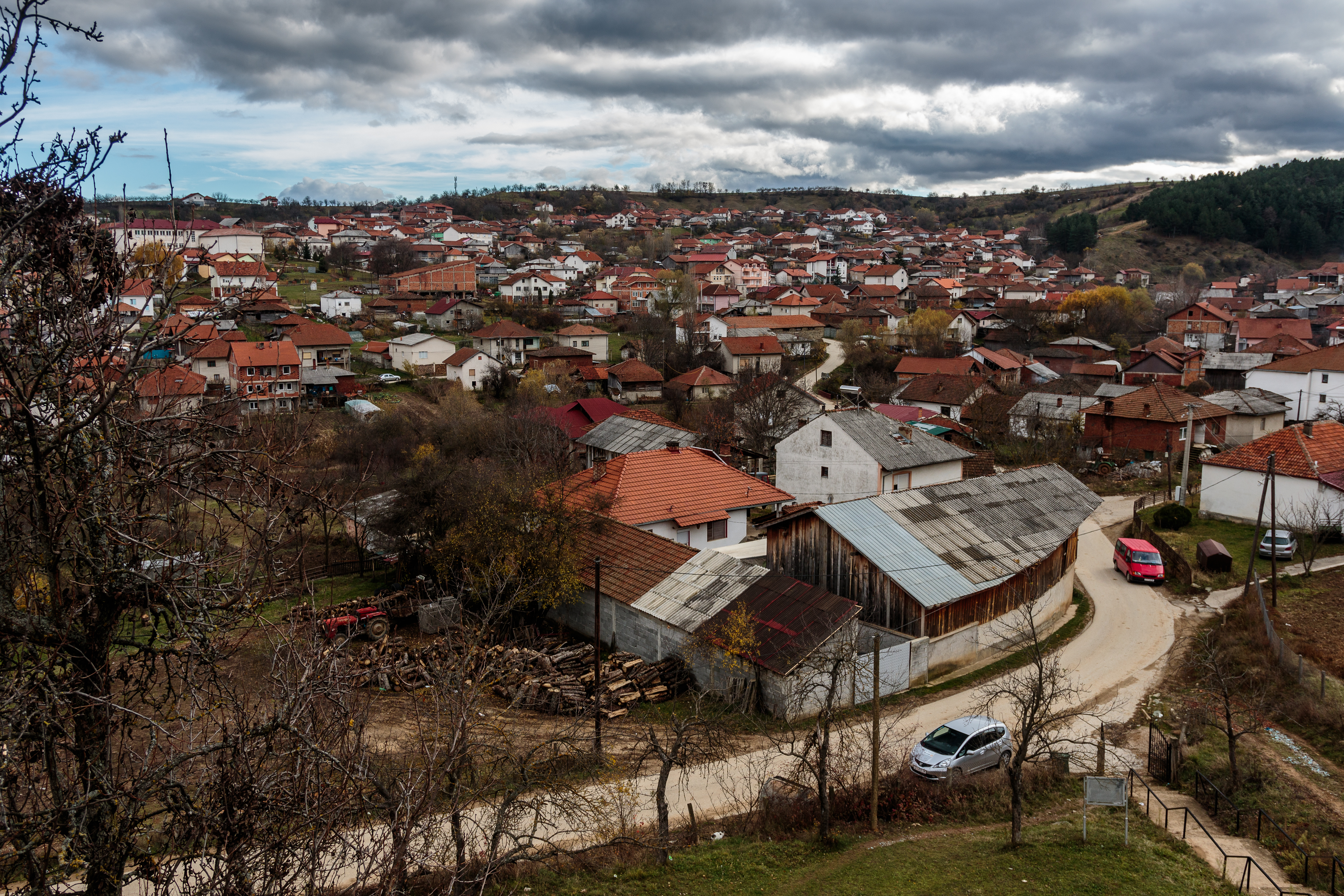
- Skyline of the village

- Location within North Macedonia
- Country: North Macedonia
- Region: Eastern
- Municipality: Berovo

Area
  - Total: 133.3 km^{2} (51.5 sq mi)
- Elevation: 900 m (3,000 ft)

Population (2021)
  - Total: 1,503
  - Density: 11.28/km^{2} (29.20/sq mi)
- Time zone: UTC+1 (CET)

Rusinovo (Macedonian: Русиново) is a village in Berovo Municipality, North Macedonia. It is one of the biggest villages in the country by land area. In 2021, the village had a population of 1,503.

== History ==
The settlement was mentioned as Русинова in a defter of 1621–1622 where 44 jizya households were recorded.

Vasil Kanchov's 1900 survey recorded 1500 Bulgarian Christians and ten Roma in the village. Later in 1905, Secretary of the Bulgarian Exarchate Dimitar Mishev (writing as "Brancoff") documented 1,752 Exarchist Bulgarians and six Roma in the village, with one primary school, two teachers, and 77 students.

On 23 December 1906, Internal Macedonian Revolutionary Organization leader Dame Gruev was killed in a shootout on Petlec Peak near Rusinovo. He was buried by villagers in the courtyard of the village church. His remains were later transferred to Smilevo.

18 people from the village were part of the Macedonian-Adrianopolitan Volunteer Corps at the start of the First Balkan War in 1912.

17 people from this village were victims of World War II.

== Geography ==
This hilly village is located in the central part of the Berovo Municipality on the northern slopes of the Maleshevo mountains, six kilometers away from Berovo. It is situated at an elevation of 900 meters and covers an area of 133.3 square kilometers, making it one of the largest villages in the country by land area.

== Demographics ==
=== Ethnic groups ===
The historical ethnic makeup of this village is as follows: (Note: In 1948, the population was 2,044, with no recorded ethnic composition.)

| Ethnicity | Year | | | | | | | |
| Ethnicity | 1953 | 1961 | 1971 | 1981 | 1991 | 1994 | 2002 | 2021 |
|---|---|---|---|---|---|---|---|---|
| Macedonians | 2,247 | 2,239 | 2,276 | 2,154 | 2,168 | 2,097 | 2,092 | 1,416 |
| Albanians | 0 | 0 | 0 | 0 | 0 | 0 | 0 | 0 |
| Turks | 1 | 0 | 0 | 0 | 0 | 0 | 0 | 0 |
| Roma | 0 | — | 0 | 0 | 0 | 0 | 0 | 0 |
| Aromanians | 0 | — | — | 0 | 0 | 0 | 0 | 0 |
| Serbs | 1 | 0 | 8 | 9 | 2 | 3 | 1 | 0 |
| Bosniaks | — | — | — | — | — | 0 | 0 | 0 |
| Others | 2 | 3 | 4 | 10 | 3 | 0 | 2 | 0 |
| Total | 2,251 | 2,242 | 2,288 | 2,173 | 2,173 | 2,100 | 2,095 | 1,503 (Note: There are 87 "persons for whom the data has been obtained from administrative sources".) |

=== Sex distribution ===
The historical population of both sexes in this village is as follows:

| Sex | | Year | | | | | | |
| Sex | 1948 | 1953 | 1961 | 1971 | 1981 | 1991 | 1994 | 2002 |
|---|---|---|---|---|---|---|---|---|
| Male | 1,049 | 1,152 | 1,146 | 1,176 | 1,114 | 1,130 | 1,096 | 1,096 |
| Female | 995 | 1,099 | 1,096 | 1,112 | 1,059 | 1,043 | 1,004 | 999 |

== Notable people ==
=== Born in Rusinovo ===
- Nikola Rusinski,, IMRO revolutionary
- Atanas Belchev, IMRO revolutionary

=== Died in Rusinovo ===
- Aleksandar Kitanov, IMRO revolutionary
- Dame Gruev, leader of IMRO
