= Karydia =

Karydia can refer to the following populated places:

- Karydia, Pella, in Pella regional unit, Greece;
- Karydia, Rhodope, in the municipality Komotini, Rhodope regional unit, Greece;
- San Pietro di Caridà (Greek Karydià) in Calabria, Italy.
