= Saints Peter and Paul Church, Smilevo =

Church in Smilevo, North Macedonia

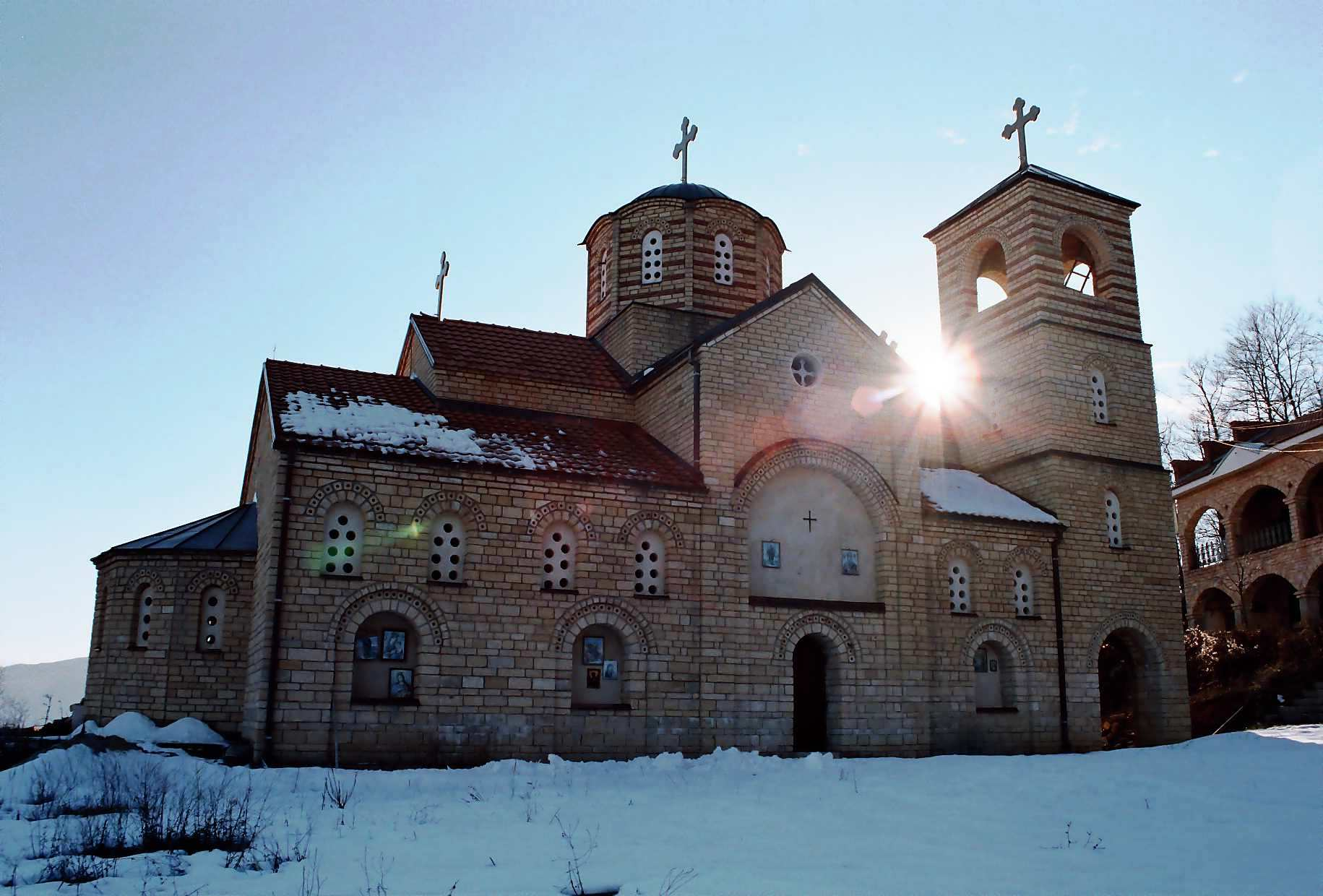
Saints Peter and Paul Church

Saints Peter and Paul Church, Smilevo is an Eastern Orthodox Christian church located in the village of Smilevo, in North Macedonia.

It stands elevated on mountainous terrain, opposite a monastery. The church is used by many residents of Smilevo.

It was begun in 1914, and constructed during World War I by stonemason and builder Cvetko Egumenoski. The church was not completed until 1917 due to the wartime unavailability of building materials.
