= Dame Gruev =

Macedonian Bulgarian revolutionary (1871–1906)

- Дамян Йованов Груев
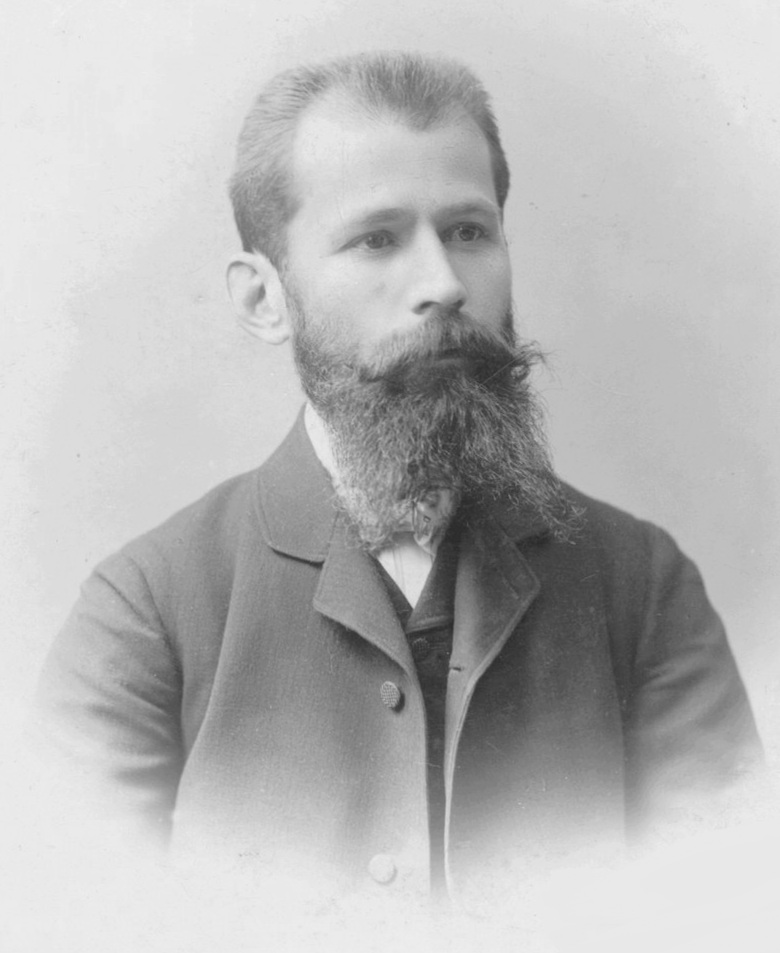
- Dame Gruev in April, 1905
- Born: January 17, 1871; Smilevo, Ottoman Empire
- Died: December 23, 1906 (aged 35); Petlec Peak, near Rusinovo, Ottoman Empire
- Burial place: Smilevo
- Citizenship: Ottoman, Bulgarian
- Occupations: Teacher, revolutionary
- Organization: Internal Macedonian Revolutionary Organization

Damyan Yovanov Gruev (Bulgarian: Дамян Йованов Груев; Macedonian: Дамјан Јованов Груев, romanized: Damjan Jovanov Gruev; January 19, 1871 – December 23, 1906) was а Macedonian Bulgarian teacher, revolutionary and leader of the Internal Macedonian Revolutionary Organization in the Ottoman regions of Macedonia and Thrace. He was one of the six founders of the Organization. Gruev is seen as a national hero in Bulgaria and North Macedonia, but his ethnicity is disputed between both countries.

== Biography ==
=== Early years ===
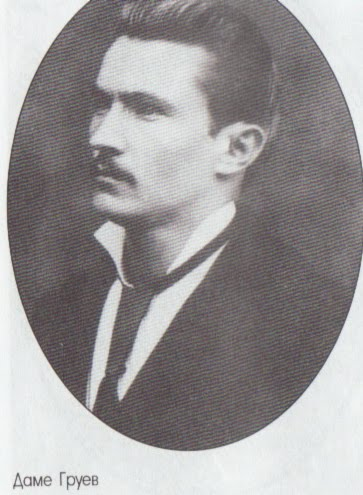
Young Dame Gruev

Dame Gruev was born on January 19, 1871, in Smilevo, Ottoman Empire (present-day North Macedonia), near Bitola. He originated from a Mijak family and was raised in a patriarchal Mijak tone. Gruev had three other siblings, while his father was a builder. His mother died early on, so his older sister took over her responsibilities. Gruev began his primary education in 1878/1879 in his native village in a Bulgarian Exarchate school, completing it in 1881/1882. He enrolled into a gymnasium in Resen in 1882/1883, but was transferred to Bitola, completing his education at the Exarchate gymnasium in 1885/1886. Gruev started studying at the Bulgarian Men's High School of Thessaloniki in 1886/1887, where he met Petar Poparsov and formed a student's circle with him. He was part of a group excluded from the school following a student revolt. In early 1888, the group, consisting of 19 people, including other future Internal Macedonian Revolutionary Organization (IMRO) revolutionaries, was attracted by Serbian propaganda. As a result, they went to study in a Serbian gymnasium in Belgrade at the expense of the Saint Sava society. They were later frustrated when they realized that attempts were made to serbianize them. In 1890, he signed a letter addressed to the Serbian National Assembly, where he came out in opposition to Serbian propaganda and self-declared as a Bulgarian along with other students. With the other students, Gruev went to Sofia to continue his education. He enrolled into the Sofia University, as a student in the Faculty of History.

In 1891, Gruev participated in the Young Macedonian Literary Society. In March 1891, he was arrested in connection with the murder of Bulgarian finance minister Hristo Belchev due to a mistaken identity, for which he was imprisoned. The killer was Dimitar Tyufekchiev. When Gruev's roommate, Dimitar Mirchev, discovered the mistake and proposed revealing it to secure Gruev's release, Gruev told him to drop the matter, because Dimitar was the sole supporter of his family, who would be helpless without him. After two weeks, Gruev was released and found out that he was expelled from the university. He returned to Ottoman Macedonia to avoid being enlisted for military service in Bulgaria. Gruev had returned with the idea to organize his people to revolt, under Vasil Levski's model. He became a teacher in Bitola. In 1891/1892, he became a teacher in his native village, where he organized the village's first adult evening school. Afterwards, he was appointed as a teacher in Prilep in 1892/1893, but due to the conservative nature of most of his colleagues, he was unable to do anything about his idea. Gruev went to Thessaloniki, where he started working as a proofreader in the printing shop of Kone Samardzhiev. Upon visiting the gymnasium, he met the school doctor Hristo Tatarchev and realized that they have similar opinions. Tatarchev had treated Gruev for eczema. After discussing what they as Bulgarians should do in order to improve the condition of their people, they decided that it was necessary to find some other people with similar views.

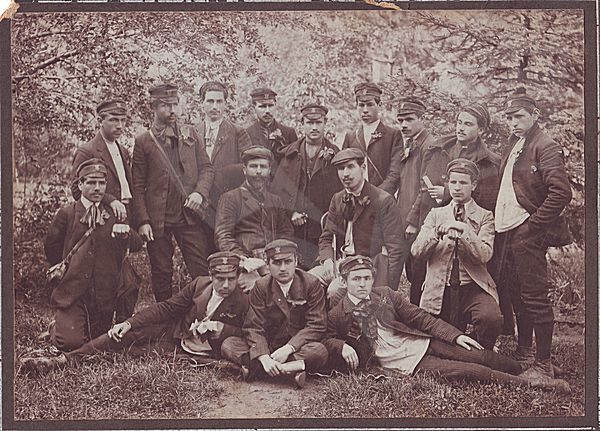
Gruev and his students from a Bulgarian school in Štip in 1894.

In 1893, he founded a revolutionary central committee in Bitola, inspired by the Bulgarian Revolutionary Central Committee, but it was disbanded. On October 23, 1893, Gruev co-founded IMRO in Thessaloniki. In his memoirs, Gruev referred to Serbian propaganda as one of the main factors for the creation of the Organization. In official documents as well as in personal correspondence, Gruev wrote in standard Bulgarian, sometimes with minor dialectal influences.

In January 1894, Gruev met with the other founders of IMRO again. They discussed the aims of the Organization and agreed on "Macedonian autonomy with the predominance of the Bulgarian element." The founders adopted the first statute of the IMRO. It was to be a secret organization under the guidance of a Central Committee, with local revolutionary committees throughout Macedonia and the region of Adrianople (Edirne). These regions were to be divided into revolutionary districts or rayons like in the April Uprising. In accordance with the statute, the first Central Revolutionary Committee was formed then, under the chairmanship of Hristo Tatarchev. Per its first statute, the membership was allowed only for Bulgarians. Gruev was elected as the secretary and treasurer. He initiated the first members of IMRO.

=== 1894 to 1902 ===
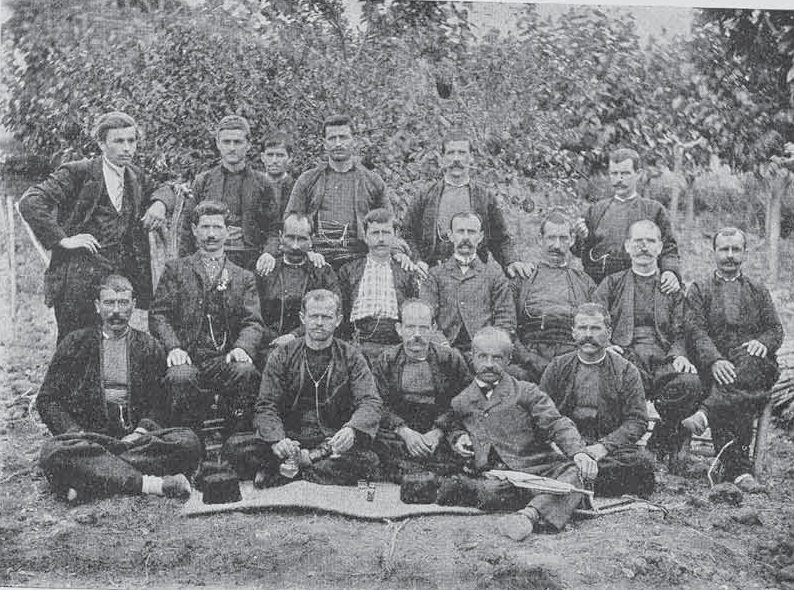
Photo of the Yenice-i Vardar IMRO committee between 1898 and 1901, published by the magazine Ilustration Ilinden in June 1934, standing from left to right: Pere Toshev (more probably Dame Gruev), Stanko Popstankov, Dime Tortopov, unknown, after him Nikola Hadzhiivanov and Hristo Litovoycheto. Second row, sitting: Teofile, Andon Popstavrev, Tomo Tushiyanov, Harish Bozhkov, Georgi Harizanov, Mite Popstavrev, Lyubishanov. Third row, sitting: Mite Chobanov, Mile Kayafov, Georgi Pophristov, Hadzhi Dionis (Hadzhi Dala) and Hristo Todev.

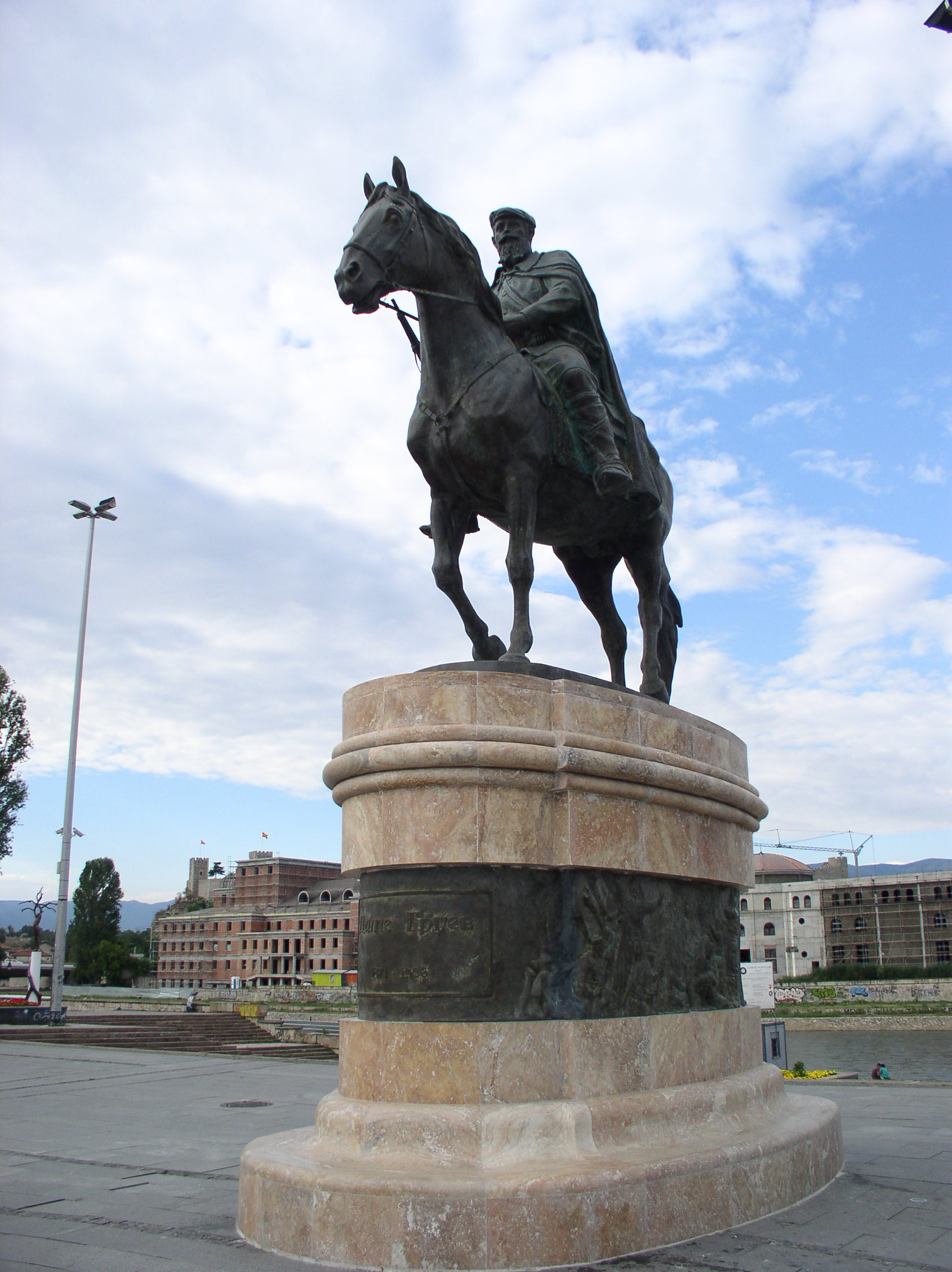
Monument of Dame Gruev in Skopje, North Macedonia)

Gruev resigned from his job in the printing shop and went to Štip, where he was offered a job as a teacher. He left Štip and went on to Negotino and Kavadarci, where he managed to establish local committees in July 1894. Gruev returned to Štip for the beginning of the school year, becoming a teacher. Tushe Deliivanov and Dame Gruev went to see the bishop, since Deliivanov was appointed by the Exarchate, and it was necessary to decide who would be head teacher. It was decided mutually that Deliivanov should take the position. He met Gotse Delchev, who was also a teacher and who joined the Organization, after Gruev informed him about its existence. The two shared the view that liberation had to be accomplished internally by a Macedonian organization without any foreign intervention. It is unknown how many active members belonged to the Organization during this period, however despite the efforts of Gruev and Delchev, the number of members grew slowly. He and other teachers also organized an adult Sunday school in Štip, at which they gave lectures on revolutionary themes, such as the Unification of Italy, the biographies of Giuseppe Mazzini and Giuseppe Garibaldi, the American War of Independence and the idea of reunification of Bulgaria. Gruev's lectures attracted large crowds. During 1895, Gruev, Delchev and Deliivanov began to produce plays, in which they themselves acted. As the Organization was in need of money, Gruev and Deliivanov decided to visit some of the richer citizens of Štip and appeal for donations. However, they managed to acquire only one lira from the owner of a chiflik.

In August 1895, Gruev initiated Hristo Popkotsev into the Organization, a teacher from Štip at the Bulgarian school in Adrianople, and on behalf of the Central Committee, obligated him with the creation of a committee of the Organization in the Adrianople vilayet. In 1896, he was appointed as a school inspector in the Thessaloniki area by the Exarchate, using his position to actively recruit members for IMRO. In 1897, Gruev was also one of the founders of the Society against Serbs. In the same year, he organized the killing of Serbian renegade Peychinovich. Gruev had been unemployed since the beginning of 1897/1898, because of accusations of atheism made against him by the conservative president of the Bulgarian Commune in Thessaloniki. During this period the relations between IMRO and the Supreme Macedonian-Adrianople Committee (SMAC) were tense. Because of Gruev's attitude towards SMAC, on many occasions they tried to discredit him in an effort to remove him from the Central Committee. In 1898, Gruev had a meeting with the Bulgarian prime minister Konstantin Stoilov in which a potential cooperation with IMRO was discussed, after the meeting Gruev felt disappointed. At Stoilov's insistence that the forced collection of money from the population be stopped, Gruev requested that the Bulgarian government allocate additional funds for weapons, but it was refused. Later in a meeting with the Bulgarian diplomat Atanas Shopov, Gruev suggested that the government did not keep its promises and was not honest towards the Organization, and stated that "we cannot conform to their policies and wishes, but will work independently and fight it, just as we fight all our opponents". At Gruev's insistence, the forcible collection of money from the population in Bulgaria continued, and the firm position that the Bulgarian government against these actions led to serious disagreements.

In 1898, the Ottoman authorities interned him in the region of Bitola. Gruev became the leader of the Bitola regional committee. In August 1900, a priest named Stavre had been murdered by the Organization for refusing to contribute to its funds and for betraying one of its members to the authorities. Gruev was arrested in early August in connection with the murder. In March 1901, he was sentenced to 10 years in prison. Due to the corruption of the prison authorities, he was able to receive visitors, correspond with others, and to direct the work of the revolutionary committee. He was transferred from Bitola in May 1902 to the prison Podrum Kale in Asia Minor, where he was together with other members of the Central Committee. He remained in prison for 10 months until March 1903 when he was amnestied.

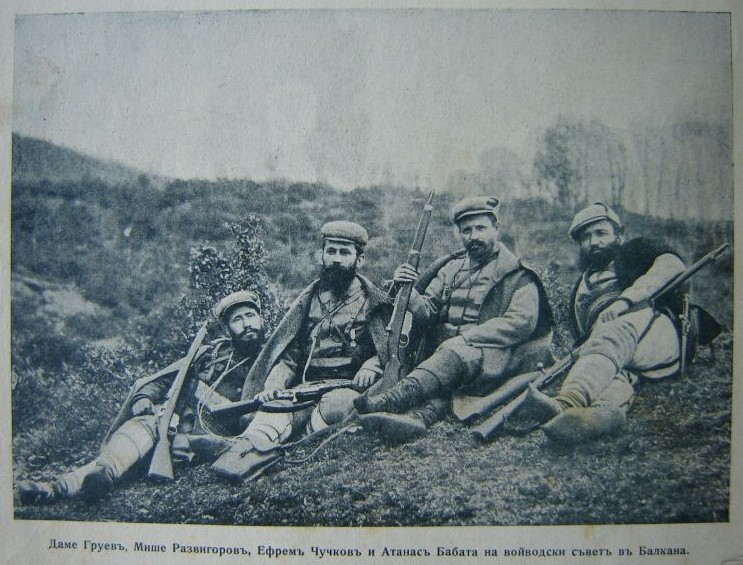
Dame Gruev together with other rebel leaders

=== Uprising ===
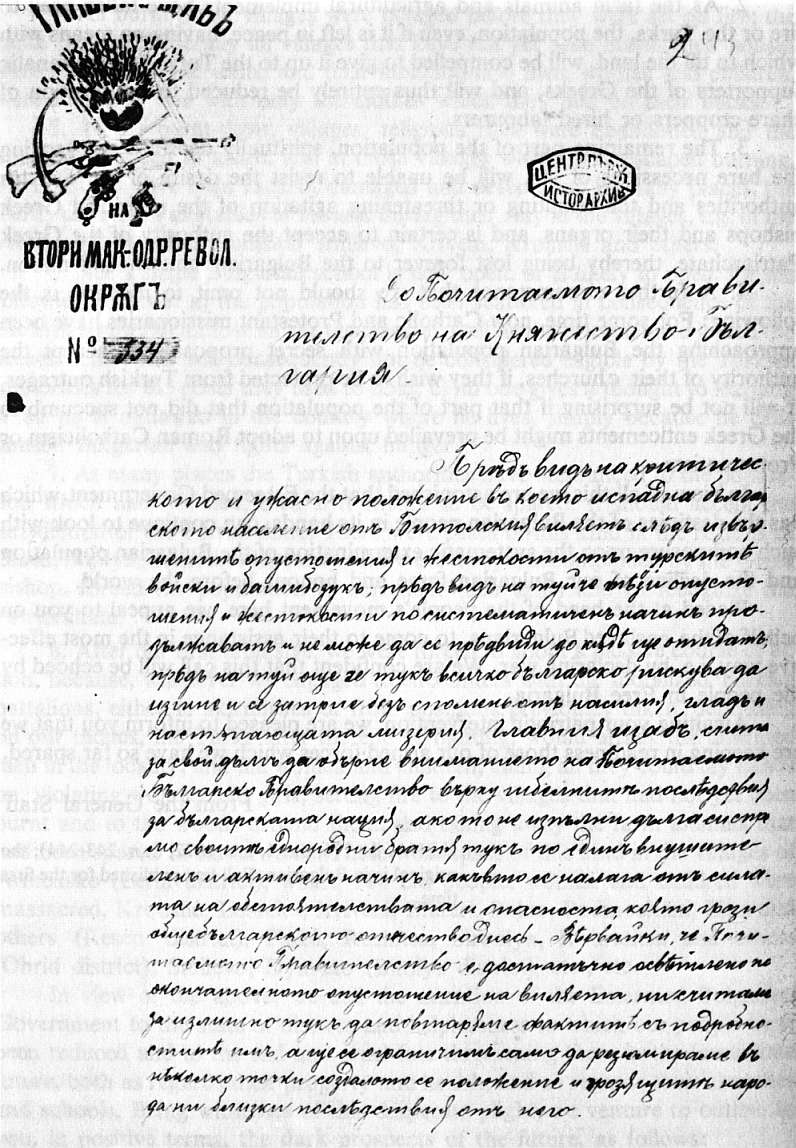
Letter from the General Staff of the Monastir (Bitola) Revolutionary Region to the Bulgarian government, requesting military intervention for the salvation of the local Bulgarians.

When he was released in 1903, the decision to carry out an uprising had already been made. After his release from prison, Gruev met with Delchev in Thessaloniki to discuss the upcoming uprising. Gruev accepted the inevitability of the uprising and said: "Better an end with horrors than horrors without end." He presided the congress of IMRO in Smilevo between May 2 and 7, 1903. A General Staff of the uprising, consisting of him, Boris Sarafov and Anastas Lozanchev, was elected. They chose August 2 as the beginning of the uprising. During May, Gruev and Sarafov, accompanied by detachments, toured the Manastir vilayet to verify that their instructions concerning arming and organization of items were being followed. On August 2, the Ilinden Uprising was launched. Gruev participated in the fighting for Smilevo, which the insurgents managed to capture and set up defensive positions. In the same month, he organized the defense of Smilevo, but it was unsuccessful as the insurgent positions fell apart in the Ottoman assault. In September, the General Staff sent a letter to the Bulgarian government, calling "on behalf of the enslaved Bulgarians, to come to their assistance in the most effective way, by declaring war." According to historian Veselin Traykov, the letter was written by Gruev.

=== After the Uprising ===
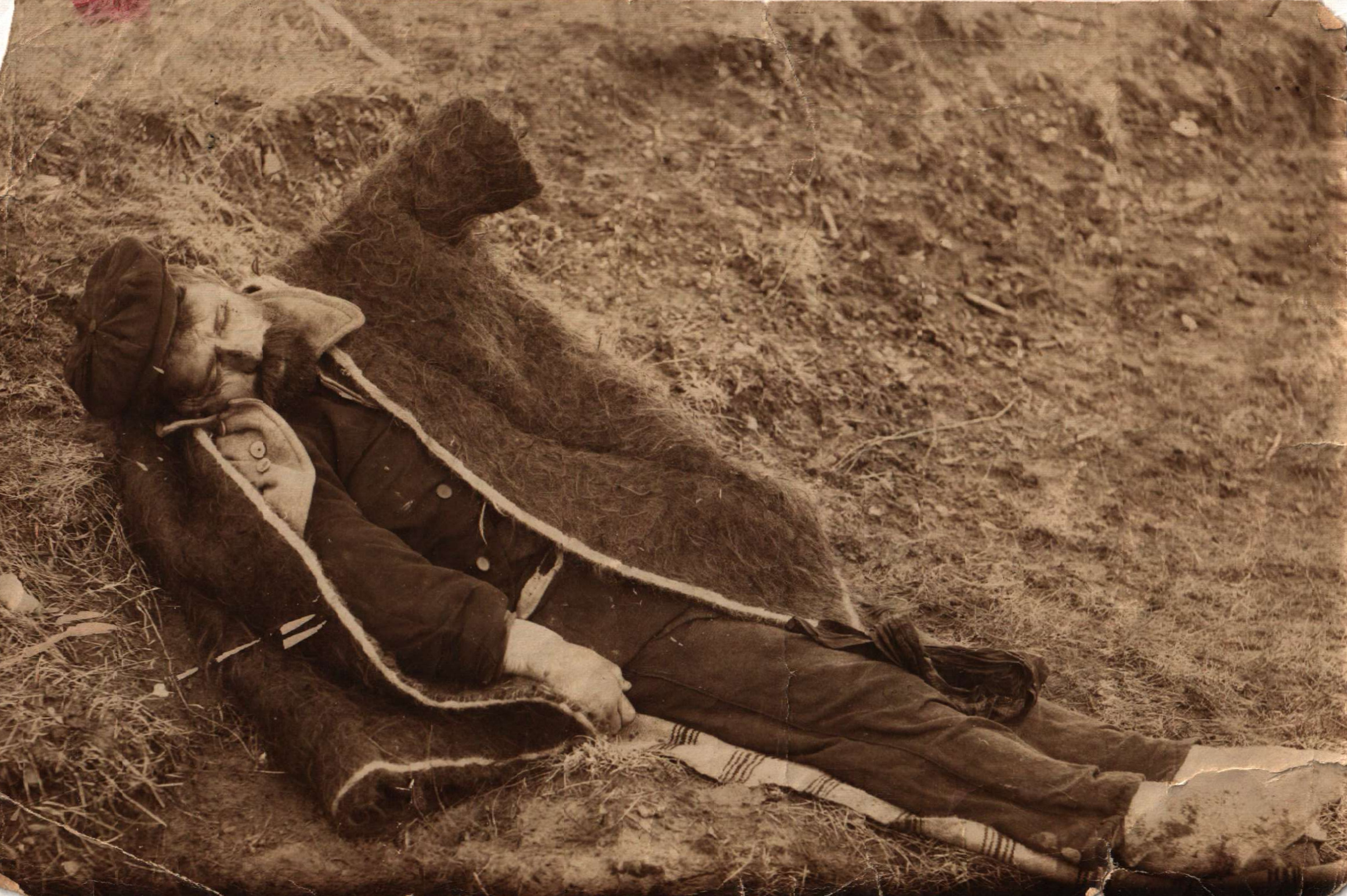
Dame Gruev's dead body.

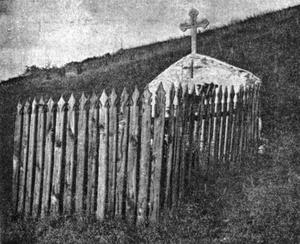
Dame Gruev's grave

After the uprising was suppressed, Gruev remained in Macedonia to rebuild the Organization. In early 1904, the Bitola revolutionary committee forcibly converted Patriarchist villages to the Exarchate, using threats, beatings and murders. Gruev was one of the initiators for the forcible conversions. Pere Toshev and Gyorche Petrov accused Gruev of making most decisions arbitrarily, without consulting other members and described his exercise of power as "dictatorial". In the post-uprising period, the Organization was divided by a right-wing (centralist) and a left-wing (federalist) faction. Gruev tried to reconcile both factions. According to political scientist Alexis Heraclides, Gruev ended up with the centralists. On October 5, 1904, he was captured by Serbian vojvoda Micko Krstić, with a detachment funded by the Serbian consulate in Bitola. His captivity lasted for a month and affected the morale of IMRO's supporters. Gruev was released with the intervention of the Serbian government. After his release, Gruev offered the Serbs cooperation with the Bulgarians within the framework of IMRO, but no compromise was reached.

He participated in the Rila Congress in 1905, becoming part of the new Central Committee. Gruev proposed initiating a new general uprising with Bulgaria's participation, but it was rejected by all delegates. He decided to return to Macedonia. In his memoirs, IMRO revolutionary Milan Matov wrote that when he met him in June 1906 in Sofia, Gruev told him: "We are Bulgarians and we always work and will work for the unification of the Bulgarian nation. All other formulas are a stage to achieve this goal." On December 22, 1906, he and his detachment arrived in the village Rusinovo to attend a congress of IMRO. A host of a house warned about the arrival of Turks from Pehčevo, but the village voivode ignored the warning, so Gruev and his detachment ended up staying there. On the next day, the Turks arrived and noticed the komitadjis in the house, engaging in a shootout. Gruev was wounded. He and another komitadji managed to escape, making their way to Petlec Peak. As he was wounded, the Turks easily tracked them through Gruev's blood trail. He was killed by the Turkish soldiers. The people of Rusinovo buried him in the courtyard of the village's church. His remains were later transferred to Smilevo. The Turkish press described him as the "biggest leader of the Bulgarian Revolutionary Committee."

== Legacy ==
He is considered a national hero in Bulgaria and North Macedonia. His ethnicity is disputed between both countries. In North Macedonia, he is regarded as an ethnic Macedonian. His name has been part of the Macedonian national anthem "Today over Macedonia" since the Informbiro period after the removal of the names of Nikola Karev and Dimitar Vlahov. A monument was erected in his honor in the Macedonia Square in Skopje in 2011, as part of the "Skopje 2014" project.

A high school in Sofia as well as Gruev Cove in Greenwich Island, South Shetland Islands, Antarctica, are named after him.

== Gallery ==
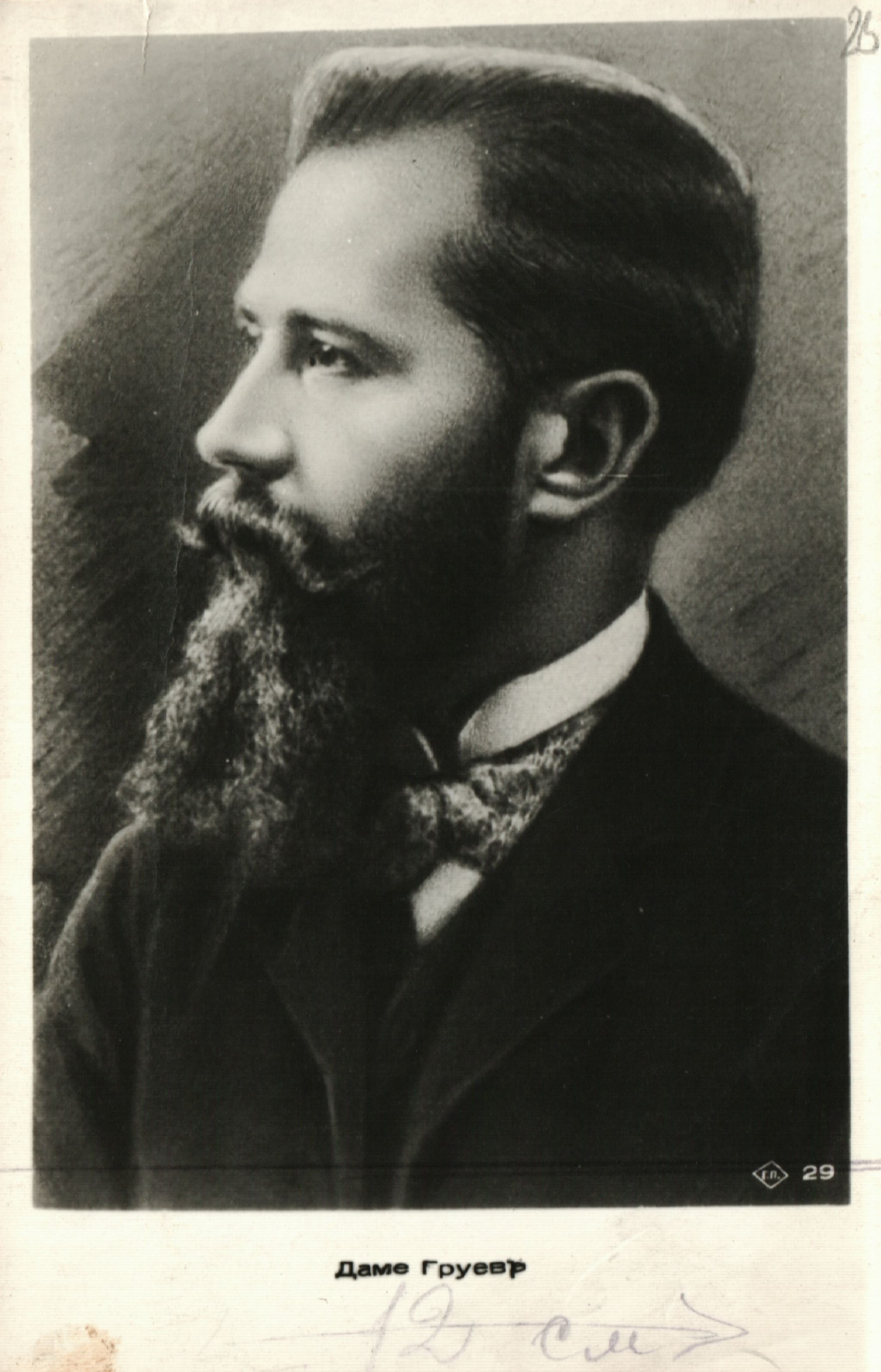
Portrait of Dame Gruev

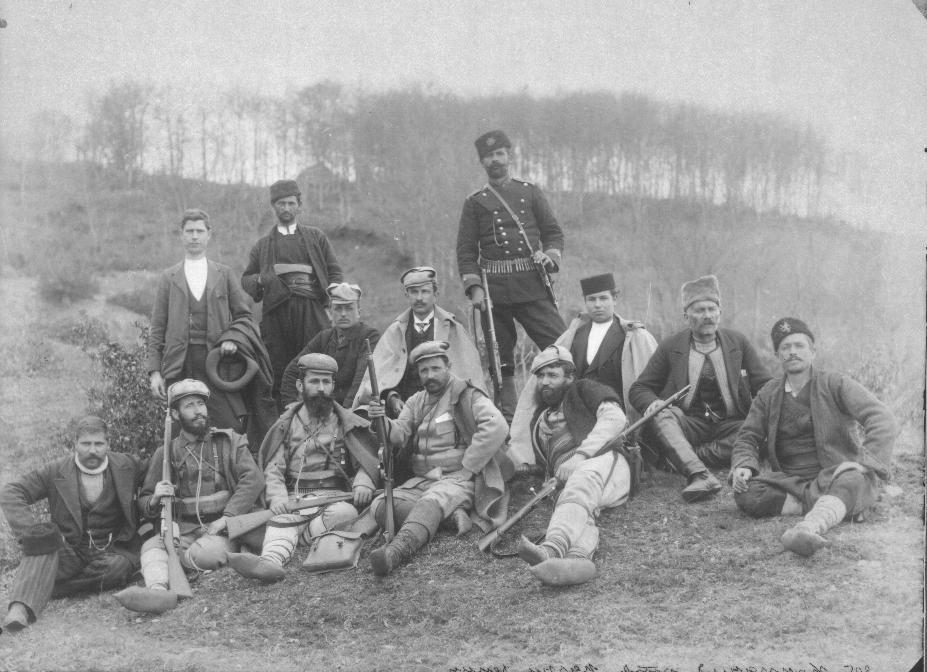
Gruev and other voivodes in 1905

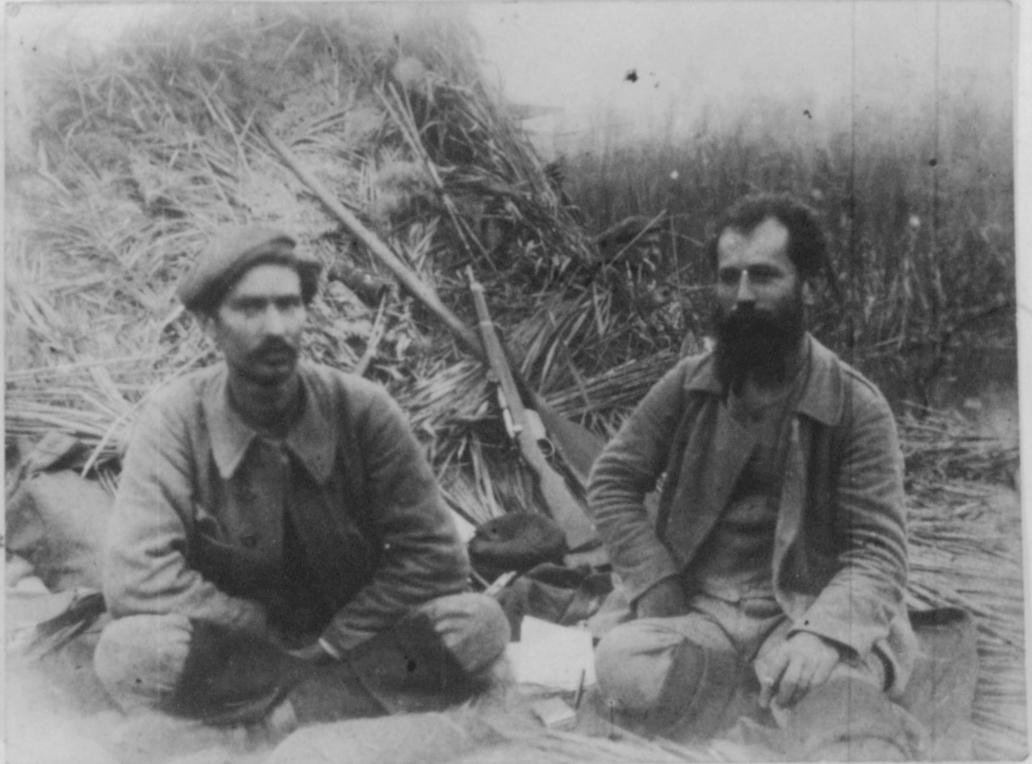
Kitanov and Gruev, the photo was taken two months before their death by Albert Sonnichsen

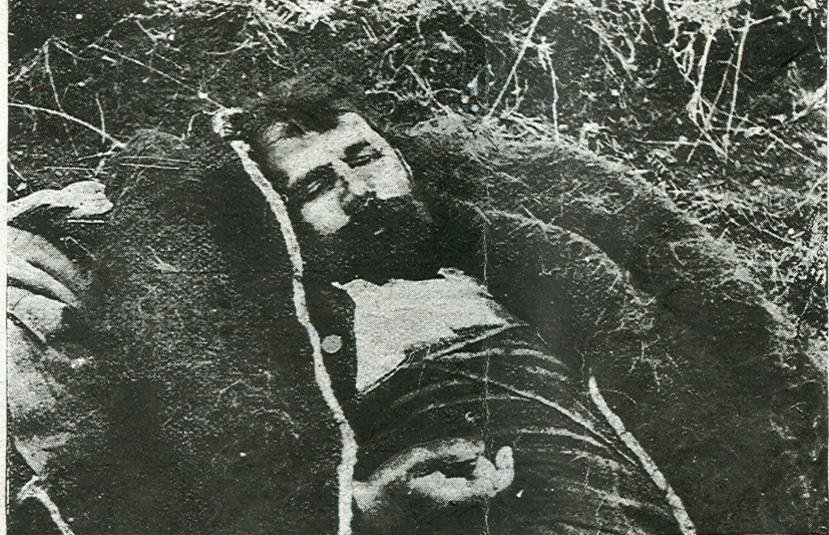
The dead body of Gruev up close

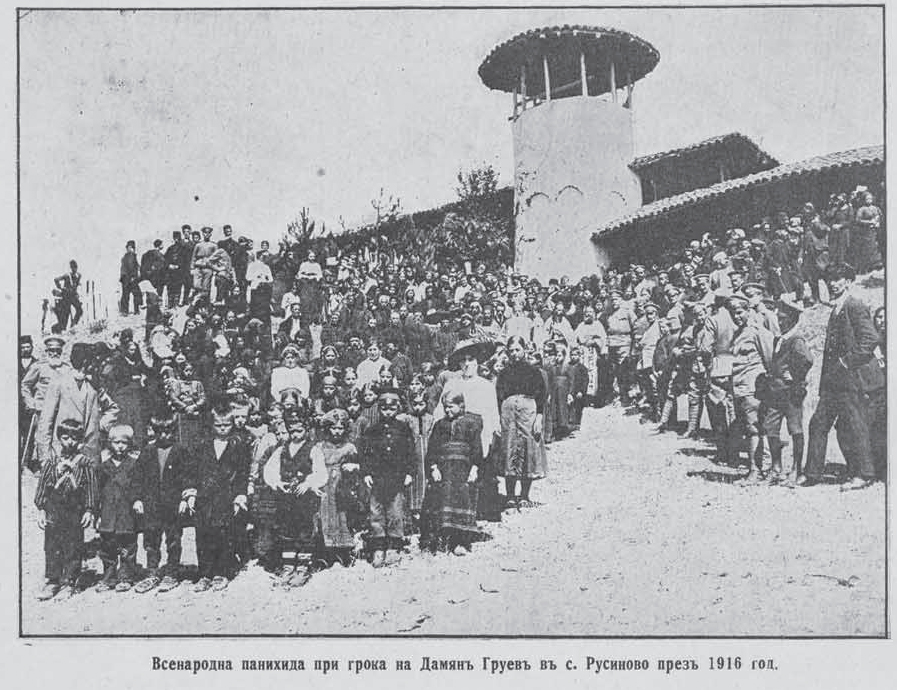
A memorial service in his name on the 10th anniversary in Rusinovo in 1916

== See also ==
- Battle of Smilevo
