= Society against Serbs =

Bulgarian anti-Serb organization

Society against Serbs was a Bulgarian anti-Serb organization established in 1897 in Thessaloniki, Ottoman Empire, by Dame Gruev, a member of the Internal Macedonian Revolutionary Organization (IMRO). It had the purpose of assassinating influential Serbs in Ottoman Macedonia, consequently maintaining Bulgarian propaganda in the region.

It was established in 1897 in Thessaloniki, Ottoman Empire, on the initiative of Dame Gruev, a professor at the Bulgarian gymnasium in Thessaloniki. It was an outgrowth of the IMRO. It came as a result of the advancement of the Serb community in Macedonia. The Bulgarian propaganda was unable to suppress the Serb advancement by cultural means, nor with espionage. The opening of Serb schools in Ottoman Macedonia was met with protest demonstrations, fights, and riots organized by anti-Serb Macedonians. Serbian teachers and students of these schools were intimidated and assaulted. The organization openly called for violence against Serbs; in the Bulgarian magazine in Thessaloniki, Narodno Pravo, in the article of Bulgarian educational cause in Macedonia (българското учебното дело в Македония), it said that "the Serbs shall, with fire and sword, be evicted from Macedonia" (1897). The organization carried out assassinations of Serbs, mostly in Macedonia. The victims had crosses carved on their foreheads with knives. The first victim with a carved cross was found in a street in Thessaloniki, the professor of the Serbian gymnasium Ilija Pejčinović. The organization had up until 1902 murdered at least 43 persons, and wounded 52 persons, who were owners of Serbian schools, teachers, Serbian Orthodox clergy, and other notable Serbs in the Ottoman Empire.

== Sources ==
- Đurić, Veljko Đ.; Mijović, Miličko (1993). Ilustrovana istorija četničkog pokreta. Narodna knj. p. 63. "Из У нутрашњеОрганизације родило се Друштво Против Срба коме је циљ био још јасније опредељен; убиство. "Да огњем и мачем искорени Србе из Македони- је", отворео је тада бугарски лист Народно Право написао. На лешевима жртава налажен је увек знак крста на челу. Извршиоци ових убистава били су најчешће најмљени циглари из Кукуша. Организатор и вођа ове акције био је Дамњан Грујев, професор бугарске гимназије у Солуну, који је доцније постао комитски војвода. Прва жртва њихова, чије је тело са урезаним крстом на челу нађено једног јутра у забаченој улици солунској, био је Илија Пејчиновић, професор српске гимназије. После његове смрти цела 1 897 година испунила се успоменама на убиства. По друмовима, по улицама, у селима, налажени су мртви наши људи. Свој ужасни посао организација је вршила смишљено, систематски и непрекидно ..."
