= Battle of Smilevo =

1903 battle of the Ilinden Uprising

Battle Of Smilevo
- Part of Ilinden uprising
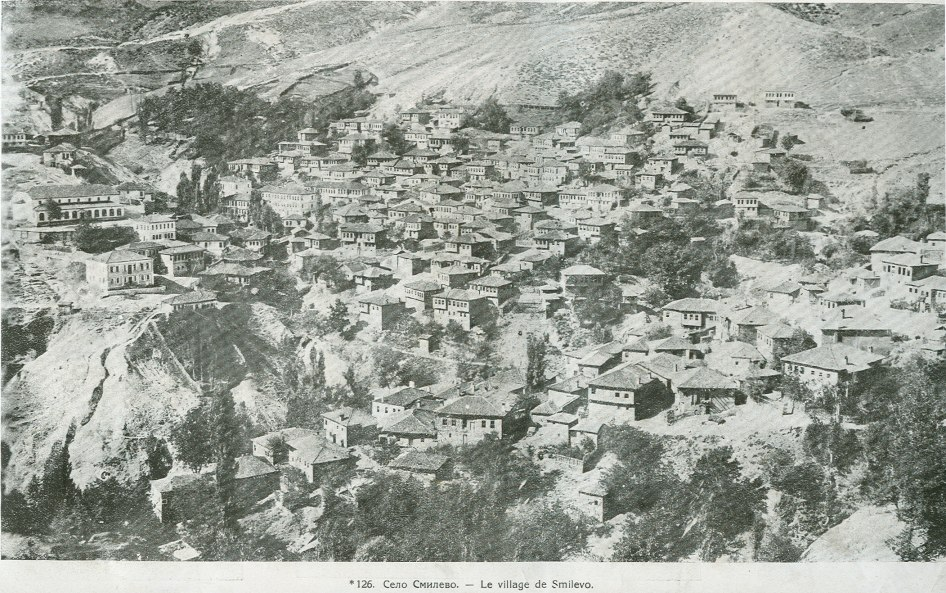
Date	August 5, 1903
Location	Smilevo, Ottoman Empire (now North Macedonia)
Result	IMRO victory

Belligerents
IMRO	Ottoman Empire

Commanders and leaders
Dame Gruev; Boris Sarafov	Unknown

The Battle of Smilevo occurred on August 5, 1903, during the Ilinden uprising against the Ottoman Empire, in the village of Smilevo, in what is today the southwest of North Macedonia.

Smilevo has a mountainous terrain and a number of forests. The Ottoman forces were unfamiliar with the area and because of the layout or surroundings of the village this went in favour of the local resistance detachments. With the help of a revolutionary leader by the name of Dame Gruev, one of the founders of the Internal Macedonian Revolutionary Organisation (IMRO), the people of the village decided to go ahead with the revolutionary ideas of Dame's work. The Smilevo Congress was also in the process of forming, with the assistance of a number of revolutionary leaders that worked together with Dame Gruev. Boris Sarafov and Atanas Lozanchev had decided to also join the Smilevo Congress to assist with the process of maintaining the set up of the Congress associated with Dame Gruev's workings. The battle saw a Turkish force, withdraw from the village after great losses on the Ottoman side. The rebels achieved a victory. Because of the number of battles lost near the area of Smilevo and Demir Hisar, the Turkish forces had named the area "the iron fortress".
