= Nikolaos Doumpiotis =

Greek soldier and revolutionary

- Νικόλαος Δουμπιώτης
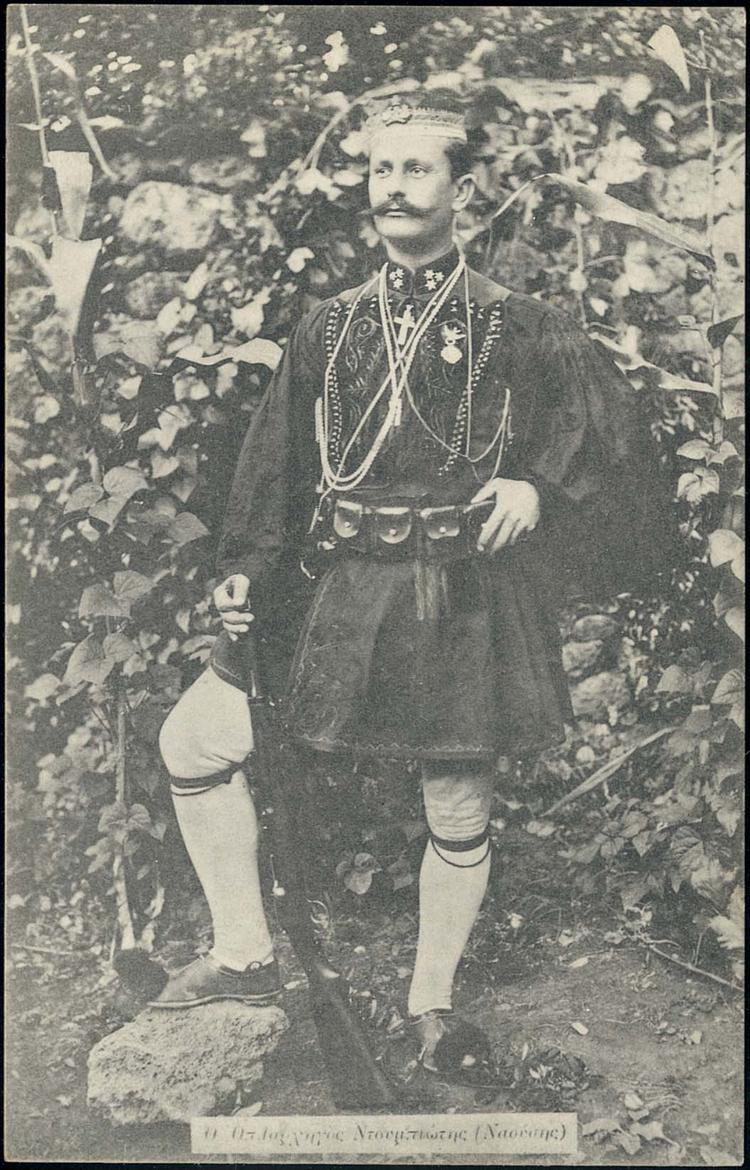
- Nikolaos Doumpiotis in Makedonomachos uniform c. 1907
- Born: c. 1866; Atalanti, Kingdom of Greece
- Died: 1951; Athens, Kingdom of Greece
- Spouse: Myrto Souri
- Children: Ioannis (son); Elisabeth (daughter)
- Military career
- Allegiance: Kingdom of Greece
- Branch: Hellenic Army
- Service years: 1882–1923
- Rank: Major General
- Nicknames: Kapetan Amyntas; Καπετάν Αμύντας
- Unit: 4th Infantry Regiment
- Conflicts: Greco-Turkish War (1897); Macedonian Struggle; Balkan Wars; First Balkan War; Second Balkan War

Nikolaos Doumpiotis (Greek: Νικόλαος Δουμπιώτης, 1866 – 1951) was a Greek soldier and revolutionary who would become known for his participation in the Macedonian Struggle. He would retire from the Hellenic Army with the rank of major general.

== Biography ==
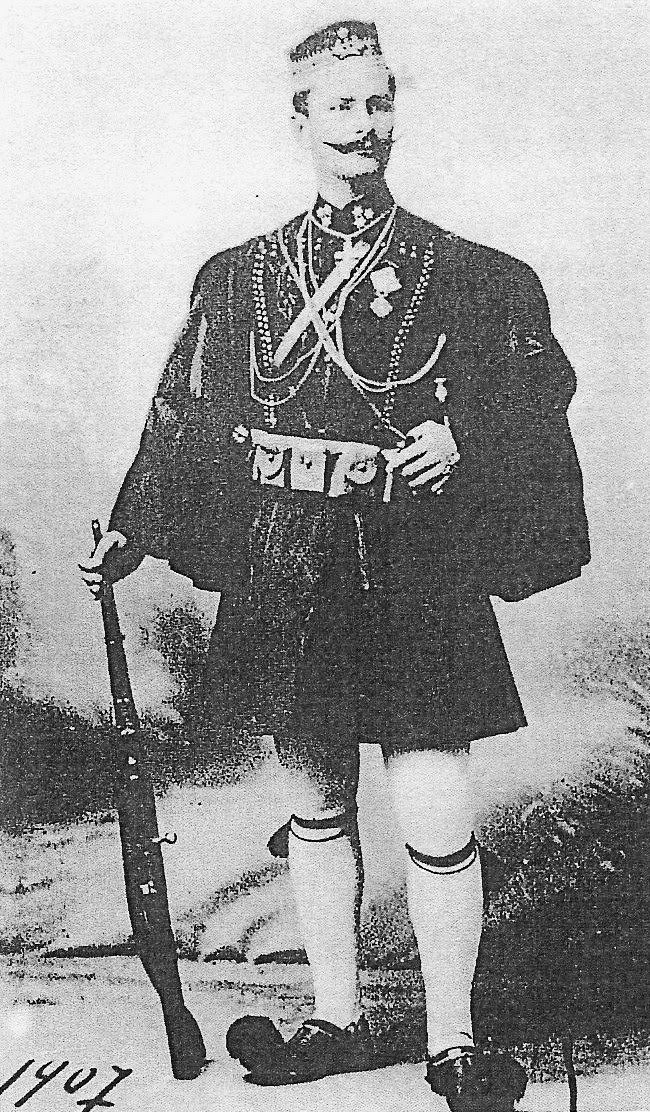
Doumpiotis during the Macedonian Struggle.

He was born in Atalanti in about 1866 and was descended from the Doumpiotis family (from Doumpia in Chalkidiki). His father Ioannis Doumpiotis took part with Tsamis Karatasos in the 1854 Macedonian rebellion. In 1882 he enlisted as a volunteer in the Hellenic army. He participated in the Greco-Turkish War of 1897 as a second lieutenant of the 4th Infantry Regiment. In 1907, he joined the Greek Struggle for Macedonia with the rank of captain and the nom de guerre "Kapetan Amyntas." His force would replace that of Tellos Agras. His area of responsibility included Veroia, Vodena and Naousa, where he fought against Bulgarian komitadjis. He participated in the Balkan Wars as a major. He retired in 1923 as a major general.

== Personal life ==
He married, in a third marriage (his first two wives had died) the daughter of the poet Georgios Souris, Myrto, with whom he had two children, Ioannis and Elisabeth. Upon the commencement of the Greco-Italian War on October 28, 1940, Ioannis enlisted as a volunteer, left for the Front and was killed in action in the first few days. His daughter Elizabeth married and gave him two grandchildren, Dimitrios and Nikolaos Giannakopoulos.

He died in Athens in 1951.
