= Tellos Agras =

Greek combatant during the Macedonian Struggle

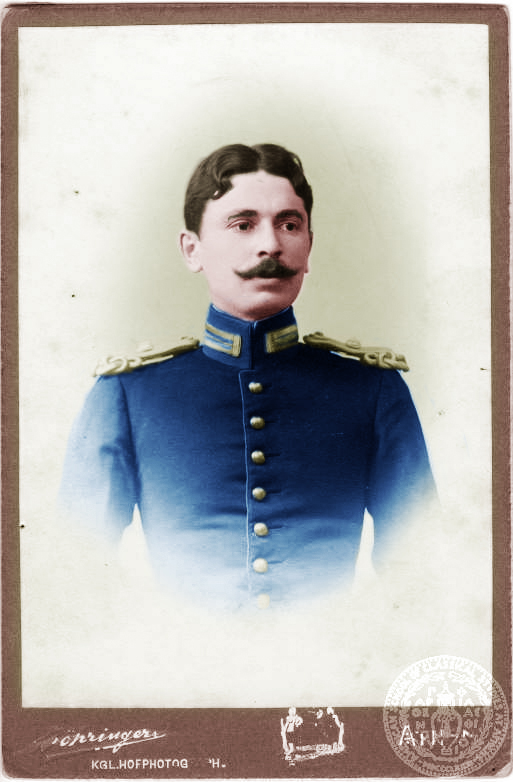
- Tellos Agras in uniform
- Born: Sarantis-Tellos Agapinos; Σαράντης-Τέλλος Αγαπηνός; 17 February 1880; Gargalianoi, Kingdom of Greece
- Died: 7 June 1907 (aged 27); Tekhovo, Salonika Vilayet, Ottoman Empire (now Karydia, Greece)
- Education: Hellenic Army Academy
- Military career
- Allegiance: Kingdom of Greece
- Branch: Hellenic Army
- Service years: 1901–1907
- Rank: First Lieutenant
- Nicknames: Tellos Agras; Τέλλος Άγρας; Kapetan Agras; Καπετάν Άγρας
- Conflicts: Macedonian Struggle (executed)

Sarantis-Tellos Agapinos (Greek: Σαράντης-Τέλλος Αγαπηνός, c. 1880 – 7 June 1907), known by the nom de guerre Tellos Agras (Τέλλος Άγρας), was a Greek officer of the Hellenic Army who played a prominent role during the Greek Struggle for Macedonia.

== Early life ==
Agras was born in Gargalianoi, Messenia in about 1880, from an important family of that region, members of which had participated in the Greek War of Independence. He entered the Hellenic Military Academy, from where he graduated as lieutenant of the Hellenic Army in 1901.

The increasing presence of Bulgarian Internal Macedonian Revolutionary Organization guerrilla troops in Ottoman-held Macedonia and their actions against the followers of the Patriarchate of Constantinople and generally against the Macedonian Greek population concerned Greek public opinion in Athens, which led to the creation of some underground organizations financed by wealthy Greeks, initially without official support, with the intention of establishing Greek military bands in Macedonia to confront the threat. Agras entered one of these organizations, the Macedonian Committee in 1904, after the death of Pavlos Melas.

The Bulgarian troops were often allied with Aromanian armatole soldiers.

Tellos Agras was Agapinos' pseudonym. Tellos meant "perfect" and "complete" but also "the one from afar", "the one who is not among us". On the other hand, Agras meant "fierce", "untamed", "wild".

== Involvement in the Macedonian Struggle ==
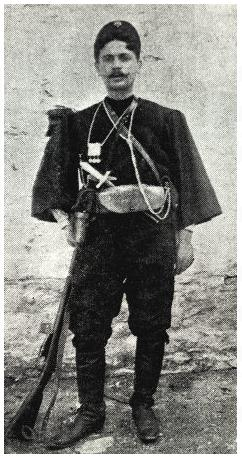
Tellos Agras in Makedonomachos uniform (1906).

In September 1906, he entered Macedonia leading a 14 men band with the mission to protect Greek villages in Giannitsa Lake (called O Valtos, i.e., "the Swamp" by locals) from the attacks of VMRO members that controlled the northern part of the lake. With the help of local Macedonian Greeks such as the wealthy tradesman Zafeiris Loggos and Antonis Mingas from Naoussa, in only three months he managed to limit Bulgarian presence in the Swamp. But on November 14, 1906 Agras was seriously injured after an unsuccessful attack against the leader of the Bulgarian guerrilla troops, Apostol Petkov, near the village of Zervochori and was recalled to Thessaloniki to be healed. He continued his activity in the area for some months but his health deteriorated by his continuous presence and fights in the lake, resulting in his infection by malaria. The coordinator of the Greek forces, Konstantinos Mazarakis-Ainian, concerned for his life, ordered Agras to withdraw to Naoussa in April 1907, where he started recruiting locals to man the band of his substitute Captain Amyntas, alias Lieutenant Doumpiotis.

== Death ==
The Ottoman forces, although initially passive and not intervening in Greek-Bulgarian fights, began attacking both, worried by the presence of so many armed bands in the area. That led Agras to seek cooperation with the leaders of the Bulgarian forces of the area against the Turks and a meeting was arranged on June 3, 1907 between Agras and his opponent, Ivan Zlatanov (Zlatan), near the town of Aghia Foteini, 10km north of Naoussa. According to their agreement each group would be unarmed.

There are contradictory accounts of the events that led to the death of Agras and his ally Mingas:

According to one version, Agras, along with seven followers (all unarmed, as agreed), were initially met by a group of 18 Aromanians led by Mihail Handuri, who escorted them to the location of Zlatan and Aromanian chief Ioryi Mucitano, who himself commanded a group of 15 men. Despite Zlatan's opposition, Mucitano captured Agras and his ally Mingas, tortured them, and hanged them on 7 June 1907 in an area between the villages of Techovo and Vladovo.

Another version of events indicates that the meeting with Zlatan and his companions proceeded as planned, with only Agras and Zlatan being armed. It is then indicated that once the Bulgarian group realized that Agras's companions had come unarmed as intended, they accused Agras of collaborating with Turkish forces and took him into custody, releasing the rest of his group, with the exception of Mingas, who remained behind. As with the other version of events, they were held for several days until being hanged on 7 June 1907.

According to another version by the Turkish publication "Correspondence Bureau" dated 21 July 1907, a Greek force of 18 men was attacked by a stronger Bulgarian group near Vladovo, three were killed in the battle, and the rest were captured. Five were tortured, while two (including Agras) were hanged. The remaining eight were released and instructed to spread news of the incident to others. Notes found on the dead bodies, signed by the Bulgarian voivode Apostol, stated that only Bulgarian and Turkish were to be spoken in the area, and that anyone spreading the Greek language would share the same fate.

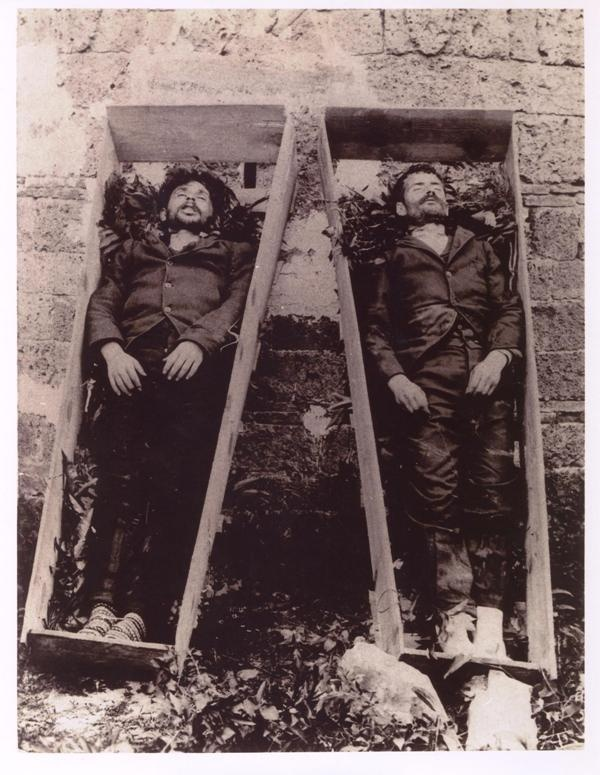
The bodies of Agras (left) and Mingas (right).

Agras was replaced by Captain Amyntas, who managed to bring order in the area between June and October 1907.

== Legacy ==
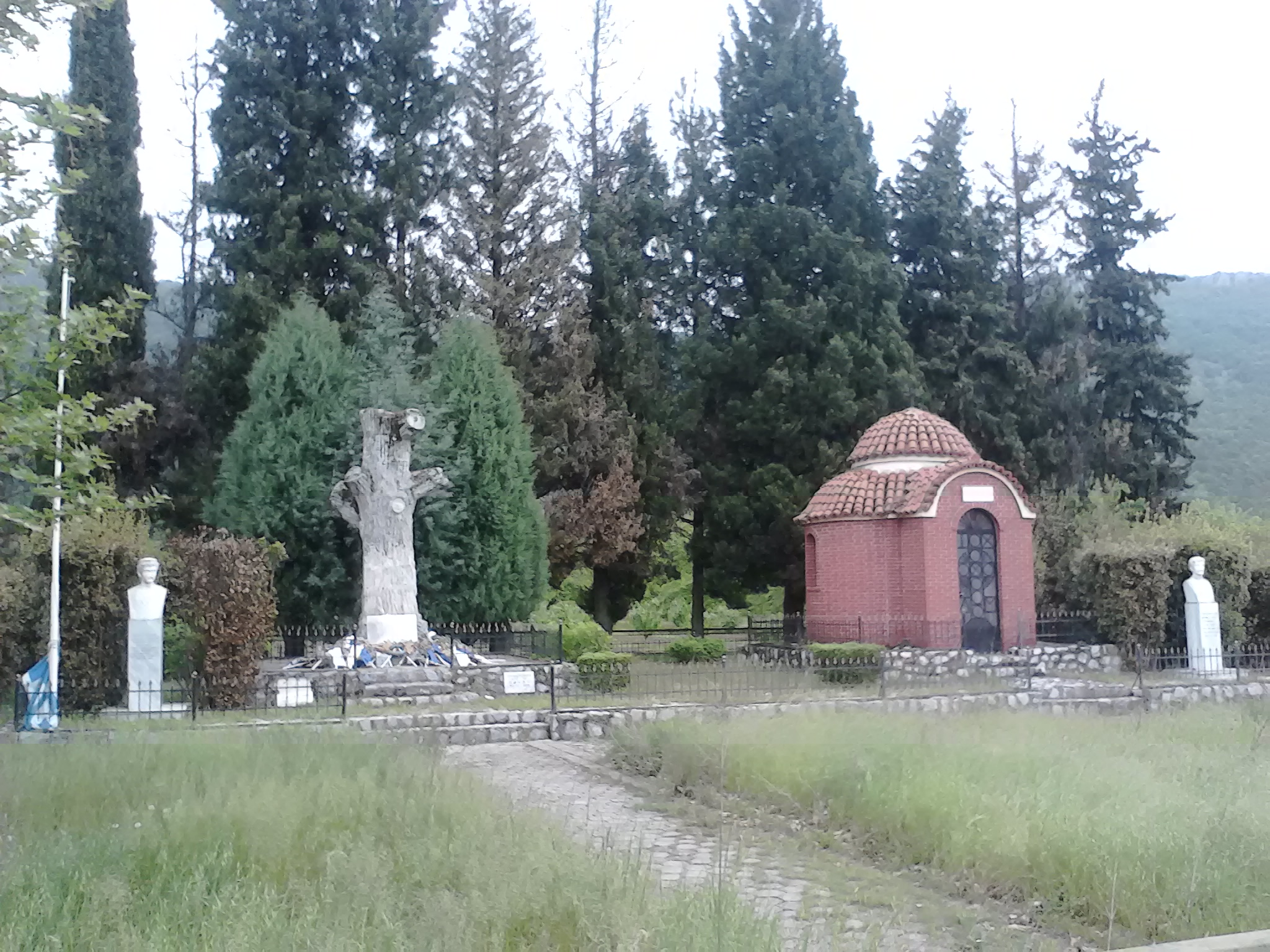
The memorial of Tellos Agras and Antonios Mingas in the location of their executions.

Tellos Agras is considered to be a martyr of the Greek Struggle for Macedonia and one of its most important and effective band leaders.

He and his exploits are better known through the pages of the novel Ta Mystika tou Valtou ("The Secrets of the Marsh"), written by Penelope Delta.

A village in Pella close to the site of his death was named Agras in his honour.

There is a memorial at the location of his hanging between Karydia and Agras.

There is a bust of him in Thessaloniki.

== Gallery ==
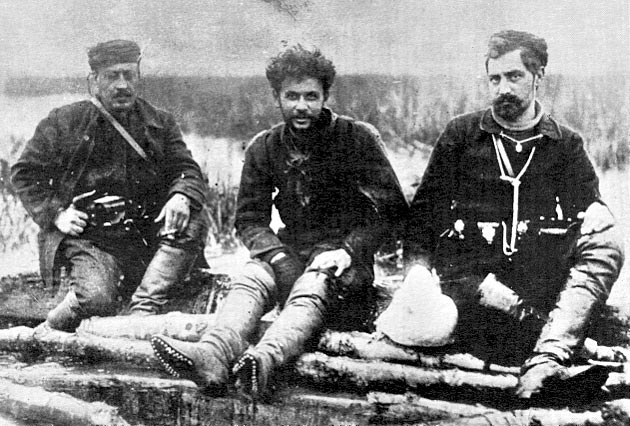
Tellos Agras (middle), with fellow chieftains, Ioannis Demestichas (left) and Konstantinos Sorros (right) at the Giannitsa Lake.

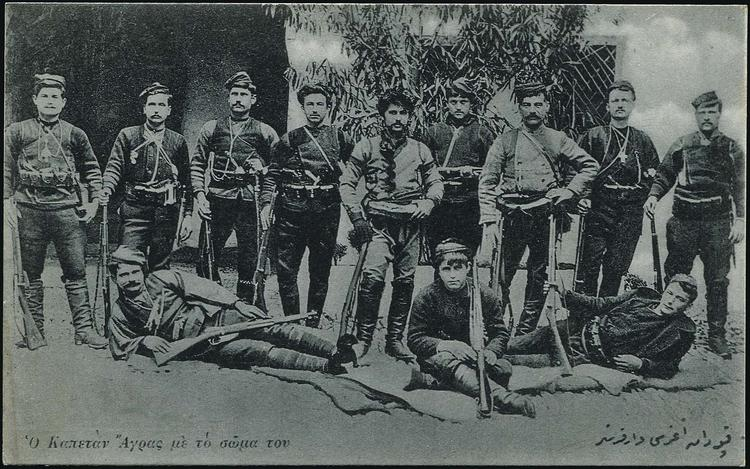
"Kapetan Agras with his band" (standing middle).

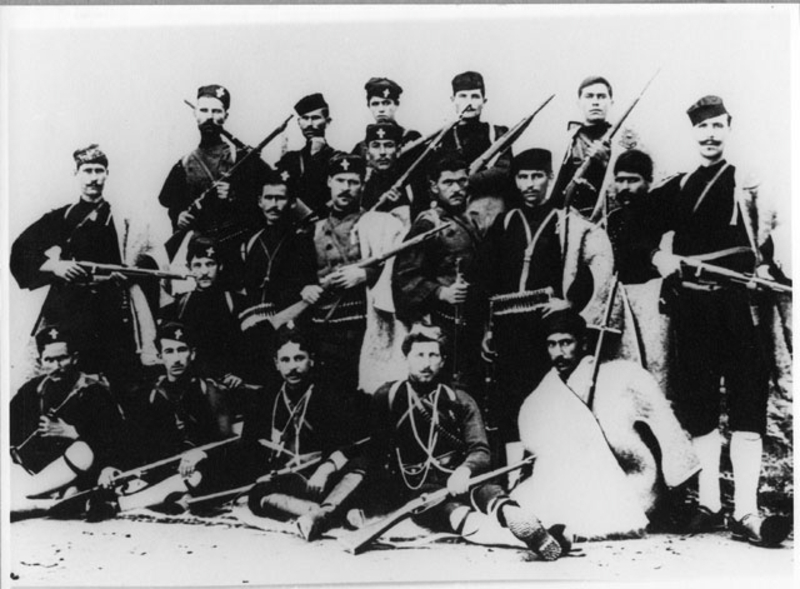
Tellos Agras (seated middle) with his band.
