= Smilevo =

Smilevo Смилево
- Village
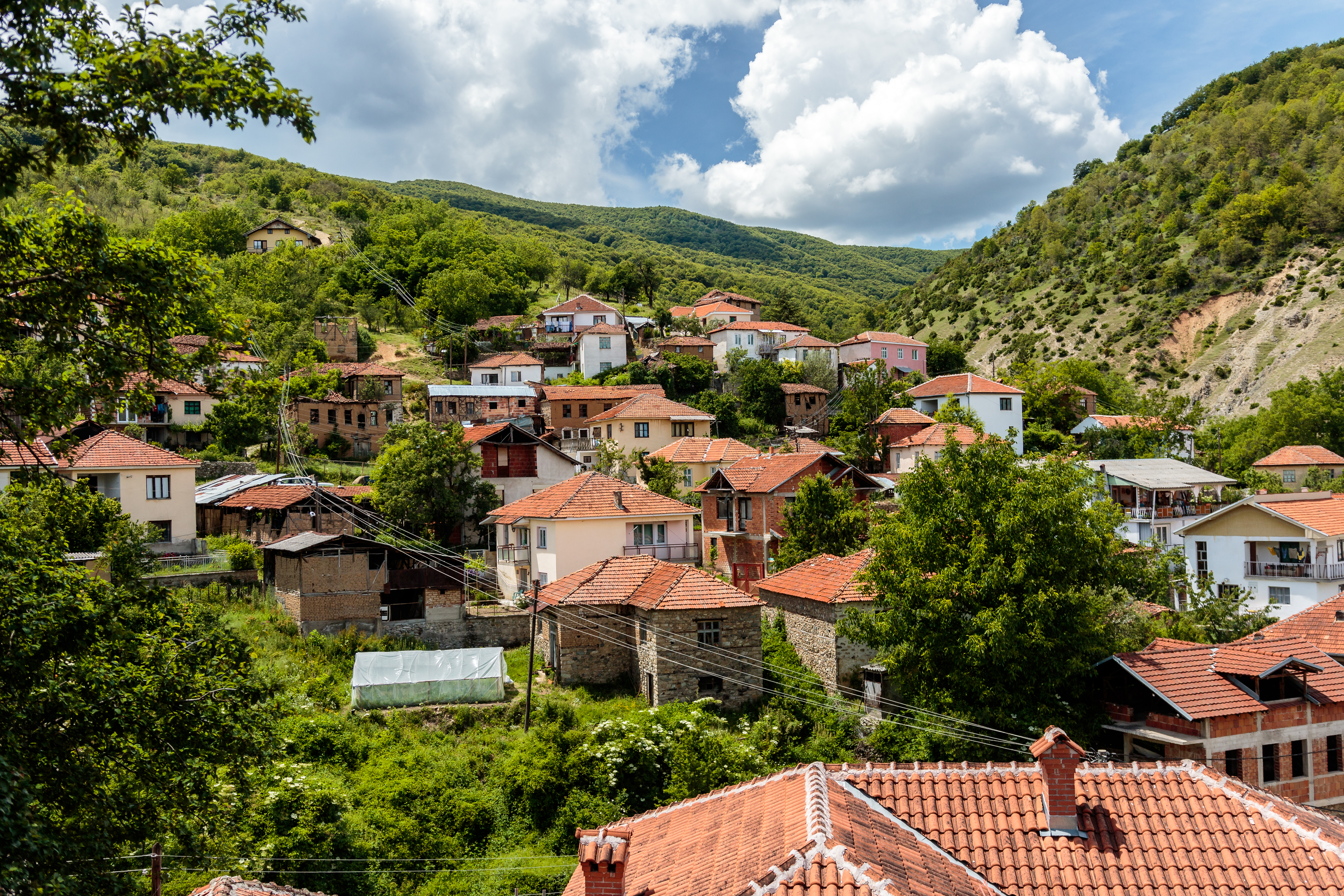
- Panoramic view of the village

- Location within North Macedonia
- Coordinates: 41°09′18″N 21°06′40″E
- Country: North Macedonia
- Region: Pelagonia
- Municipality: Demir Hisar

Population (2002)
  - Total: 321
- Time zone: UTC+1 (CET)
  - Summer (DST): UTC+2 (CEST)

Smilevo (Macedonian: Смилево) is a village in North Macedonia, municipality of Demir Hisar.

It is famous for the Ilinden-Preobrazhenie uprising which started in the village in the morning of August 2, 1903 (see Battle of Smilevo). The decision for the uprising was taken during the Smilevo congress of the Internal Macedonian Revolutionary Organization (IMRO) from May 2 to May 7, 1903.

The village is the native place of Dame Gruev, one of the founders and most prominent leaders of IMRO.

== History ==
The village was the venue of the IMRO's Smilevo Congress of 1903, at which the decision for uprising against the Ottoman rule in Macedonia was taken by the most prominent members of IMRO.

IMRO's revolutionaries rose up on August 2, 1903, which was marked as the beginning of the Ilinden uprising.

== Demographics ==
In the 1467/1468 Ottoman defter, the village had 55 households, 1 widow and 3 bachelors. A majority of household heads bore Slavic names, while around a quarter bore Albanian and mixed Slavic-Albanian ones, such as Gin son of Gerg, Gjorgo son of Progon and Millosh son of Gon.

== Sights ==
Near the village is one of the most beautiful monasteries in the country dedicated to St. Peter and Paul (Macedonian: Свети Петар и Павле, Sveti Petar i Pavle). It has been recently renovated.

On the hill above the village, there is a memorial park dedicated to Dame Gruev.

A museum dedicated to the Smilevo congress and the National Liberation Struggle was opened on the 100th anniversary of the Ilinden uprising in 2003.

== Gallery ==
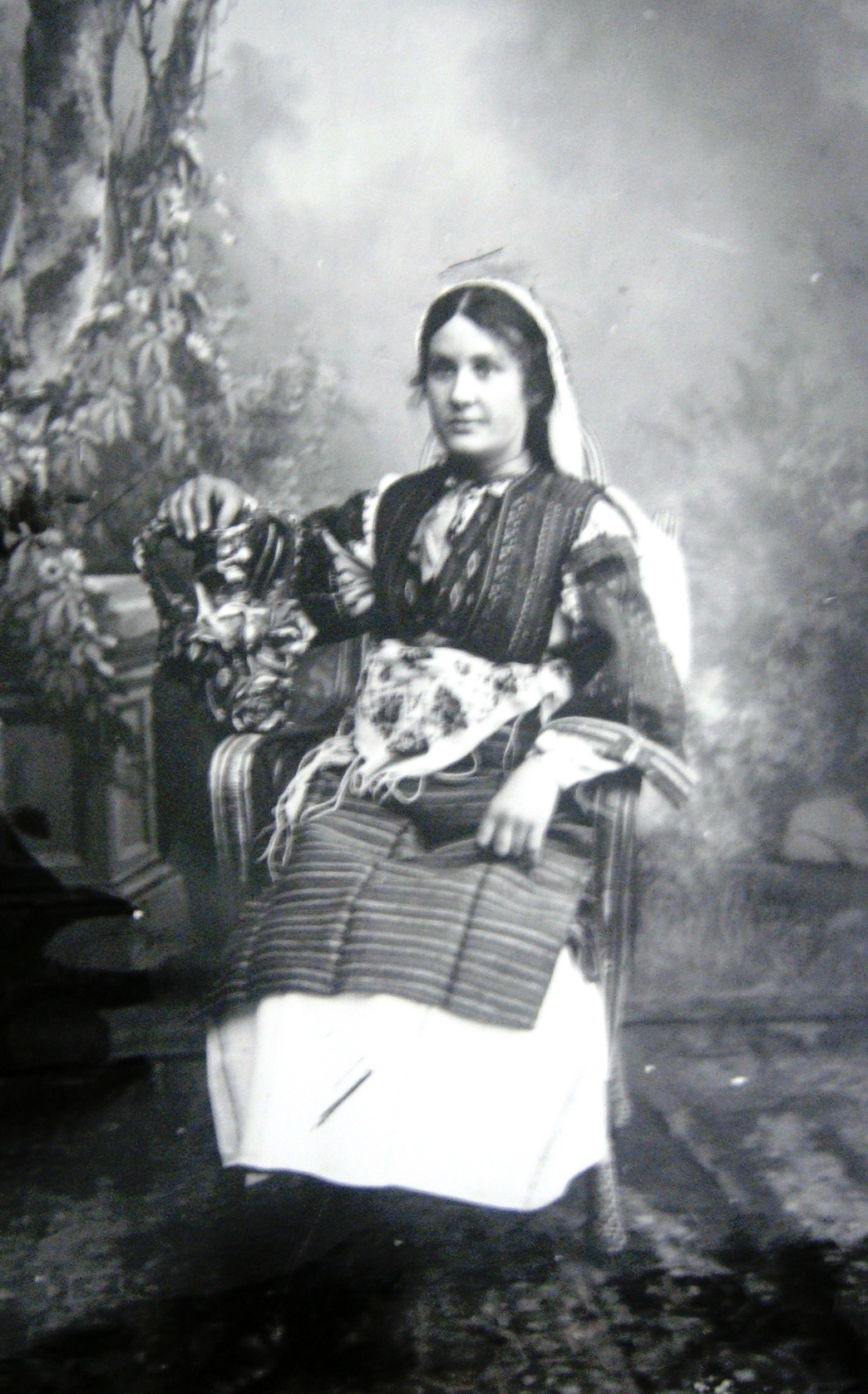
Woman from Bitola, dressed in traditional costume from Smilevo, photographed in the studio of the Manaki brothers in Bitola, between 1898 and 1912

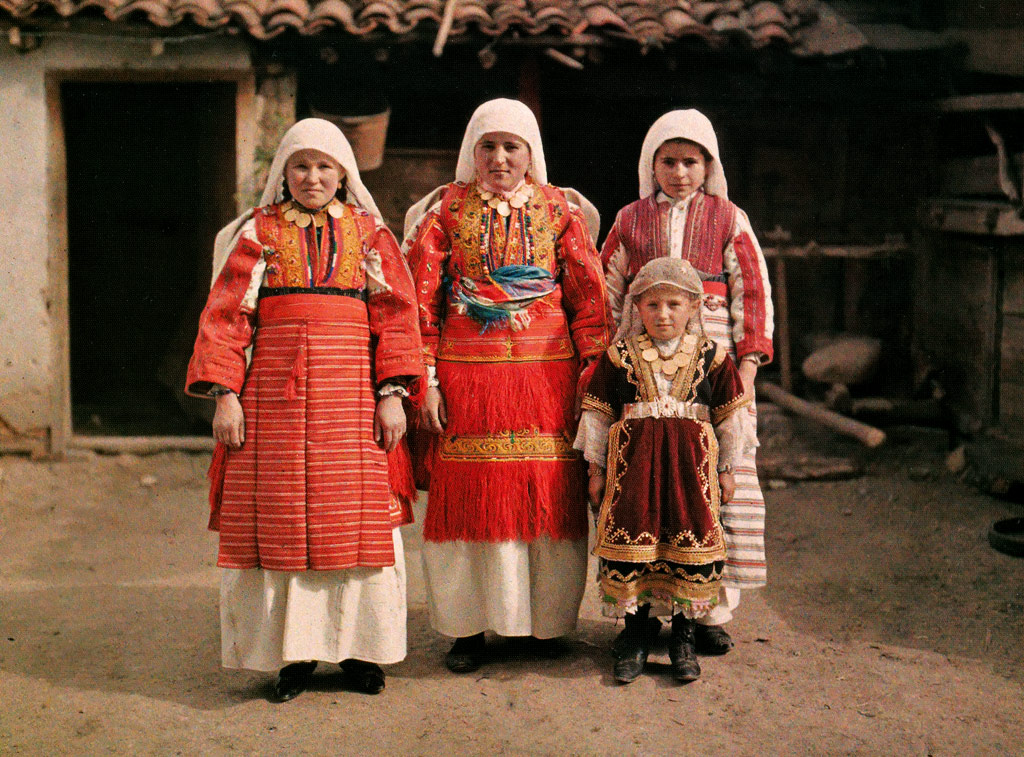
Women from Smilevo in national costume in 1913

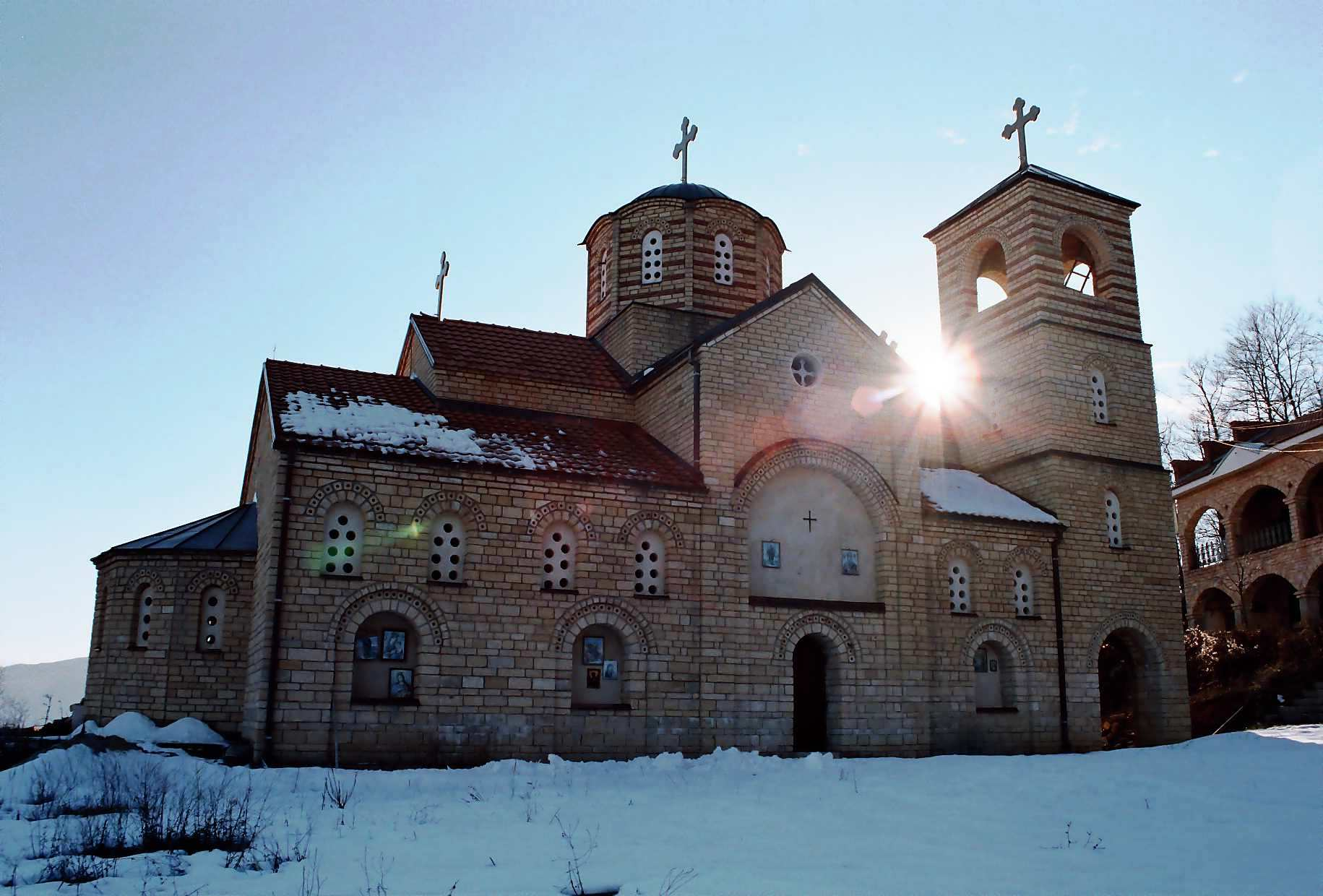
Monastery of St. Peter and Paul

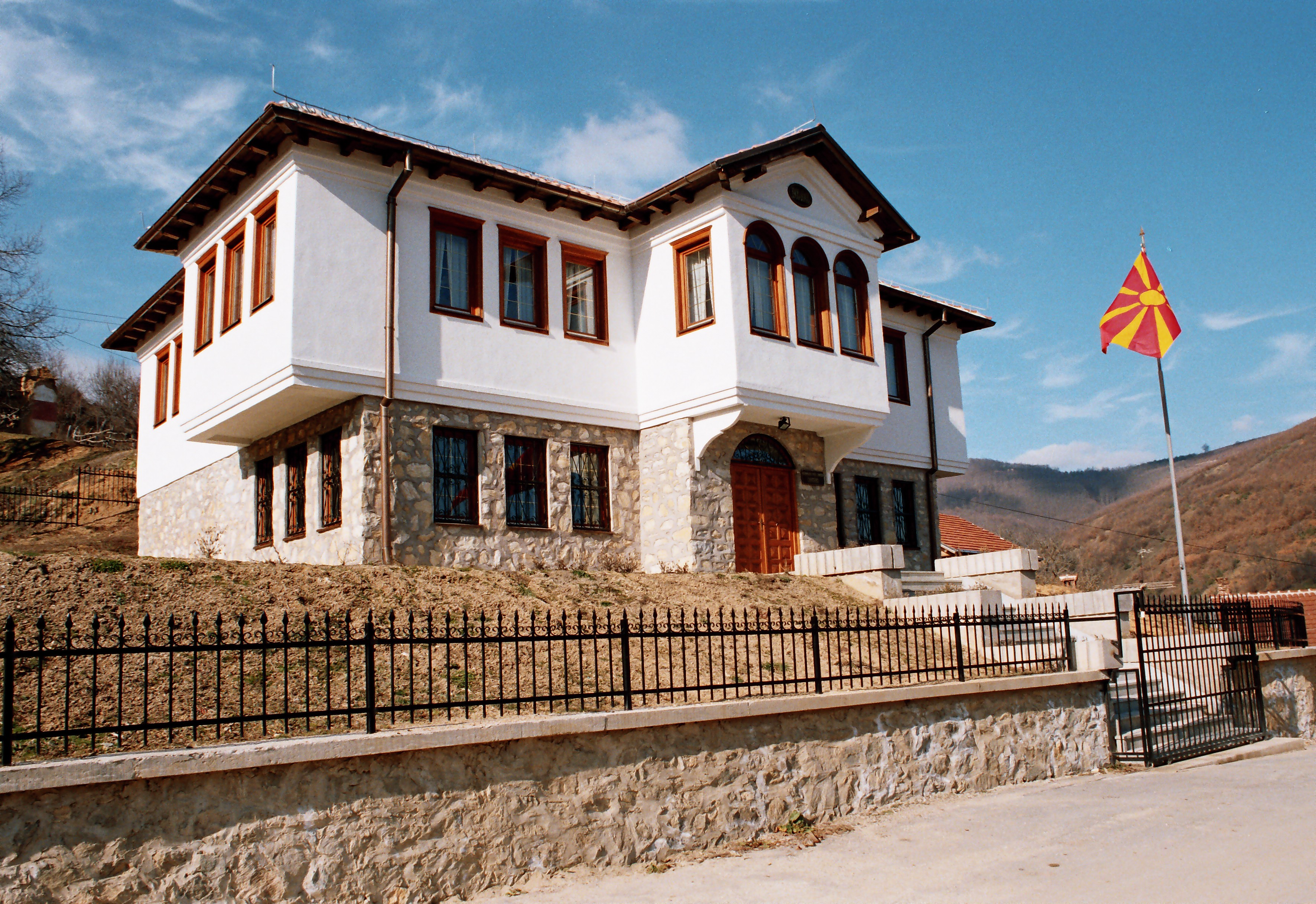
Museum dedicated to the Ilinden Uprising and to Dame Gruev

== Famous inhabitants ==
- Dame Gruev, founder of the Internal Macedonian Revolutionary Organisation
