= Karydia, Pella =

Karydia Καρυδιά
- Community
- Location within Greece
- Coordinates: 40°50.7′N 21°57.4′E
- Country: Greece
- Administrative region: Central Macedonia
- Regional unit: Pella
- Municipality: Edessa
- Municipal unit: Edessa

Population (2021)
  - Community: 843
- Time zone: UTC+2 (EET)
  - Summer (DST): UTC+3 (EEST)

Karydia (Greek: Καρυδιά, before 1927: Τέχοβο - Techovo, Macedonian and Bulgarian: Техово, Tehovo) is a village in the municipality of Edessa, Pella regional unit, northern Greece. It is situated 9 km northwest of Edessa. At the church in the locality Kosteno (Greek: Κόστενο, Macedonian and Bulgarian: Костен, Kosten) there is an annual festival on 21 May, the day of Saint Helena.

== History ==
There were 81 Christian households in the village of Tehova in 1619–1620.

In the book "Ethnographie des Vilayets d'Adrianople, de Monastir et de Salonique", published in Constantinople in 1878, that reflects the statistics of the male population in 1873, Téhovo was noted as a village with 187 households and 880 Bulgarian inhabitants.

In 1900, Vasil Kanchov gathered and compiled statistics on demographics in the area and reported that the village of Teovo was inhabited by 604 Bulgarian Christians.

== Climate ==
The Pella region has a Mediterranean/moderately temperate climate, winters are relatively cold, and summers are hot.

January is the coldest month of the year in Pella, with an average high temperature of approximately 8.4 °C and an average low of about 2.2 °C, During the summer months, temperatures are high: the average maximum in July reaches 31.8 °C, while the average minimum (night) is around 20.1 °C.
