= Roygos Ridge =

Mostly ice-covered ridge in Antarctica

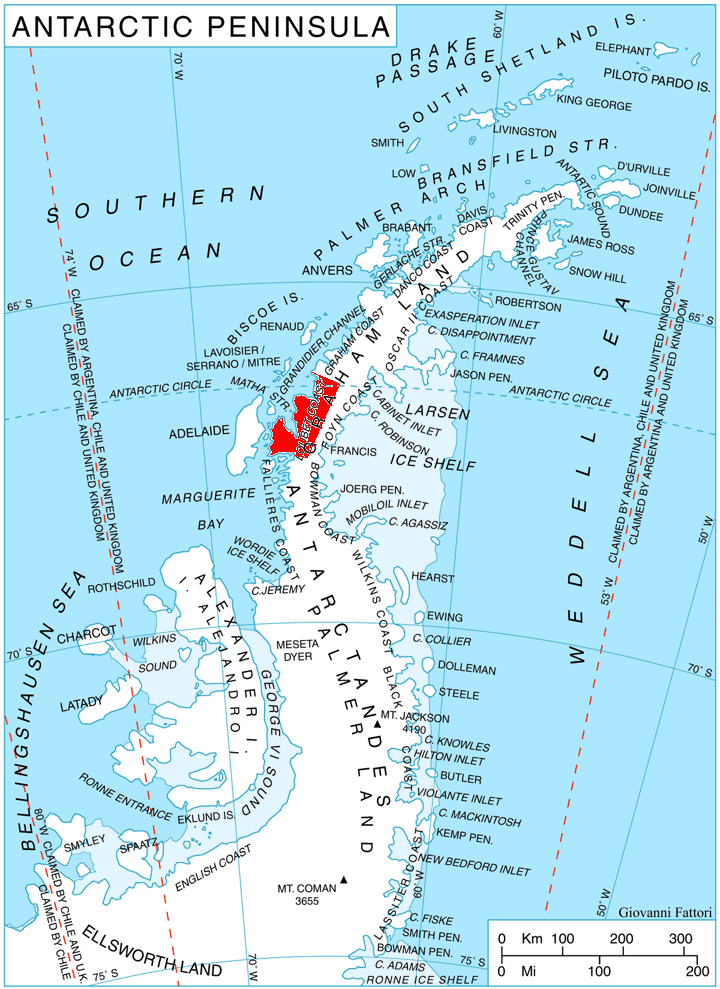
Location of Loubet Coast on the Antarctic Peninsula.

Roygos Ridge (Bulgarian: рид Ройгос, ‘Rid Roygos’ \'rid 'roy-gos\) is a mostly ice-covered ridge extending 9.6 km in a southeast-northwest direction, 3.2 km wide and rising to 1247 m on the east coast of Darbel Bay, Loubet Coast in Graham Land, Antarctica. It has rounded top and steep, partly ice-free north and south slopes, and surmounts Erskine Glacier to the south and Cardell Glacier to the north.

The ridge is named after the Thracian King Roygos (3rd century BC).

== Location ==
Roygos Ridge is located at 66°27′03″S 65°27′51″W, which is 6.8 km southwest of Mount Lyttleton, 5.65 km west of Karia Peak and 11.27 km north of Mount Bain, ending in Shanty Point on the northwest. British mapping in 1976.

== Maps ==
- Antarctic Digital Database (ADD). Scale 1:250000 topographic map of Antarctica. Scientific Committee on Antarctic Research (SCAR). Since 1993, regularly upgraded and updated.
- British Antarctic Territory. Scale 1:200000 topographic map. DOS 610 Series, Sheet W 66 64. Directorate of Overseas Surveys, Tolworth, UK, 1976.
