= Aleksandrov Peak =

Mountain in Antarctica

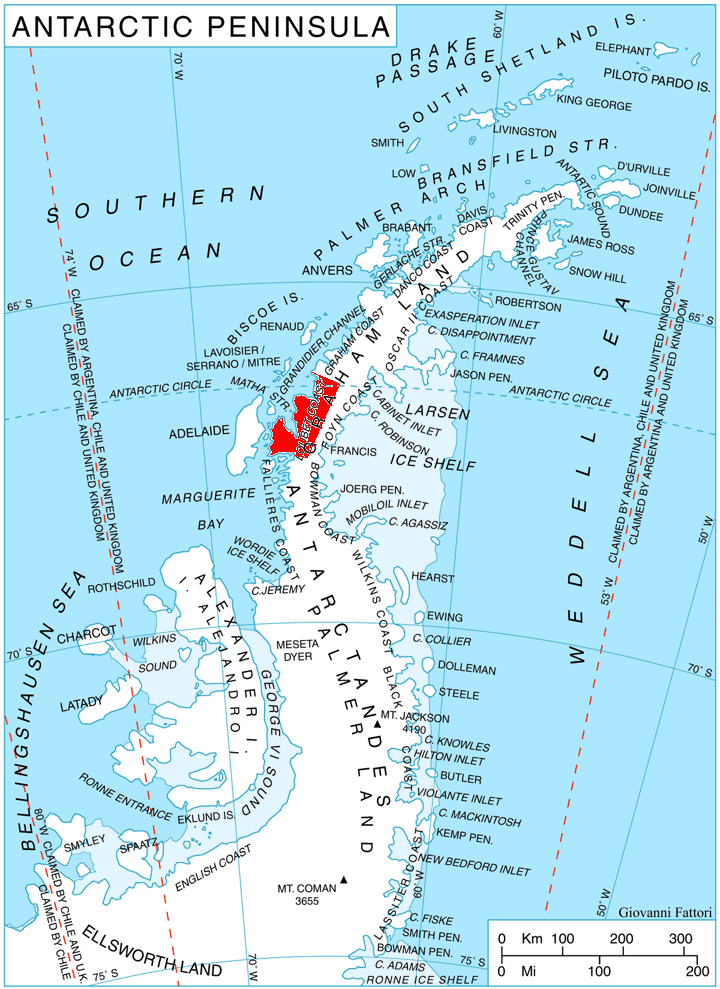
Location of Loubet Coast on the Antarctic Peninsula.

Aleksandrov Peak (Bulgarian: Александров връх, romanized: Aleksandrov vrah, IPA: [ɐlɛkˈsandrov ˈvrɤx]) is the mostly ice-covered peak of elevation 2148 m in the west foothills of Bruce Plateau on Loubet Coast in Graham Land, Antarctica. It has rounded top and steep, partly ice-free south, west and north slopes, and surmounts Erskine Glacier to the south and west, and its tributary Byway Glacier to the southeast.

The peak is named after Todor Aleksandrov (1881–1924), a leader of the Bulgarian liberation movement in Macedonia.

== Location ==
Aleksandrov Peak is located at 66°28′27″S 65°14′17″W, which is 11 km southeast of Mount Lyttleton, 9.5 km south-southwest of Purmerul Peak, 5.8 km north of Semela Ridge and 13 km northeast of Mount Bain. British mapping in 1976.

== Maps ==
- Antarctic Digital Database (ADD). Scale 1:250000 topographic map of Antarctica. Scientific Committee on Antarctic Research (SCAR). Since 1993, regularly upgraded and updated.
- British Antarctic Territory. Scale 1:200000 topographic map. DOS 610 Series, Sheet W 66 64. Directorate of Overseas Surveys, Tolworth, UK, 1976.
