= Semela Ridge =

Ridge in Bruce Plateau, Antarctica

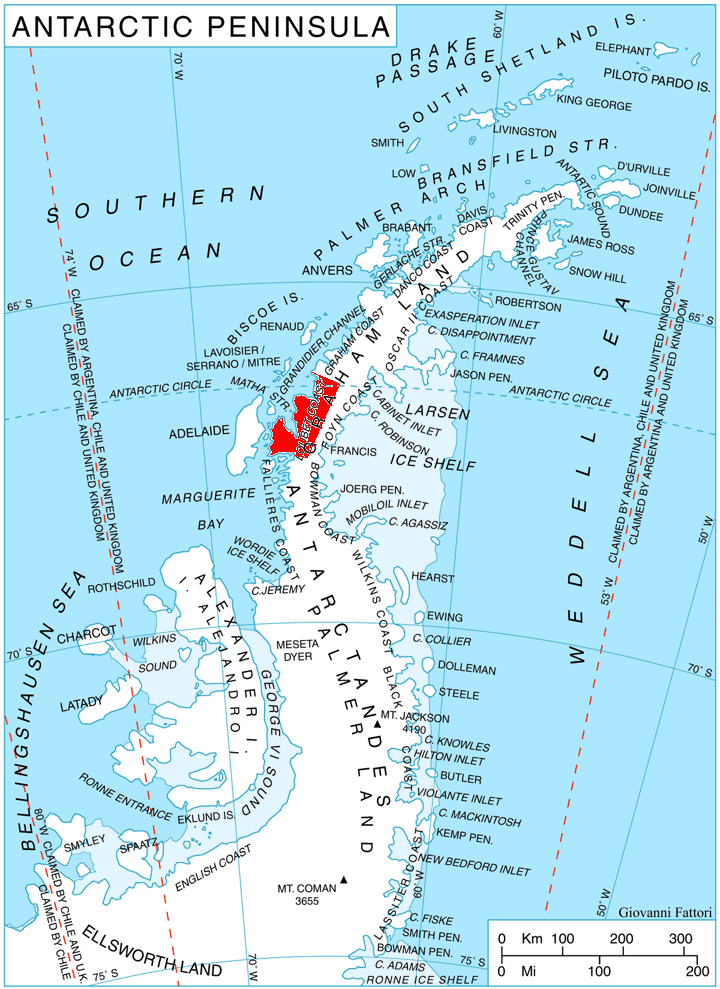
Location of Loubet Coast on the Antarctic Peninsula.

Semela Ridge (Bulgarian: рид Семела, ‘Rid Semela’ \'rid se-'me-la\ is the ice-covered ridge extending 8.5 km in east-west direction and 3.2 km wide, rising to 2026 m in the west foothills of Bruce Plateau on Loubet Coast in Graham Land, Antarctica. It has steep and partly ice-free south, west and north slopes, and surmounts Erskine Glacier to the south and west, and Byway Glacier to the north.

The ridge is named after the Thracian goddess Semela.

== Location ==
Semela Ridge is located at 66°31′31″S 65°12′48″W, which is 18.7 km north of Bacharach Nunatak, 11.2 km east-northeast of Mount Bain, 5.8 km south of Aleksandrov Peak, 14.58 km south by west of Purmerul Peak and 10.8 km west of Slessor Peak. British mapping in 1976.

== Maps ==
- British Antarctic Territory. Scale 1:200000 topographic map. DOS 610 Series, Sheet W 66 64. Directorate of Overseas Surveys, Tolworth, UK, 1976.
- Antarctic Digital Database (ADD). Scale 1:250000 topographic map of Antarctica. Scientific Committee on Antarctic Research (SCAR). Since 1993, regularly upgraded and updated.
