= Gomotartsi Knoll =

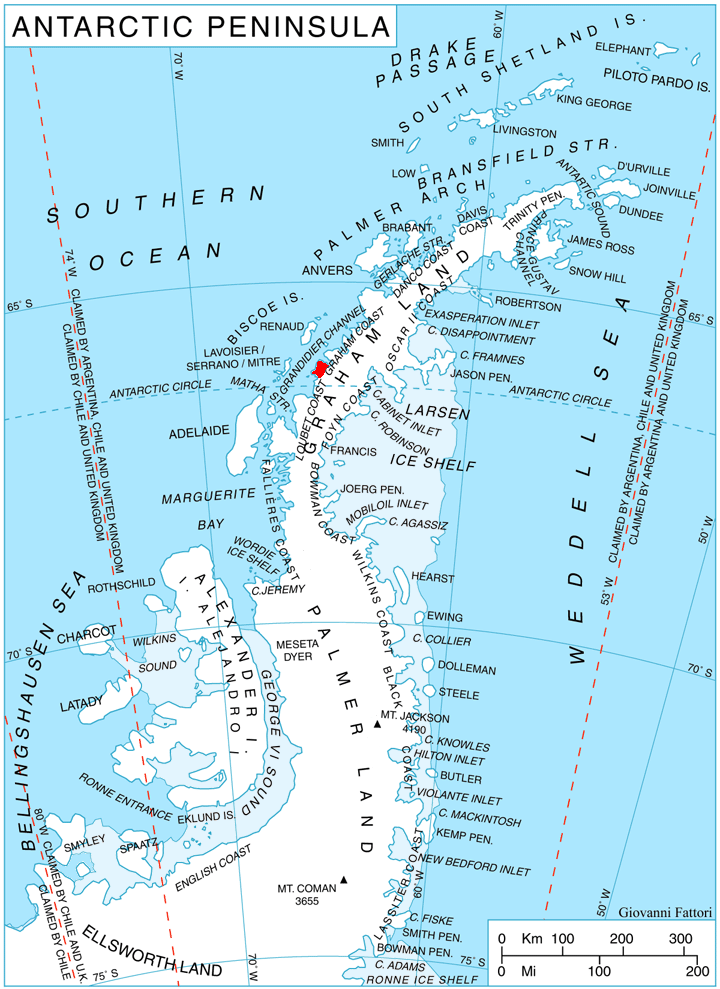
Location of Stresher Peninsula on Graham Land, Antarctic Peninsula.

Gomotartsi Knoll (Bulgarian: Гомотарска могила, ‘Gomotarska Mogila’ \go-mo-'tar-ska mo-'gi-la\) is the rocky, mostly ice-covered peak of elevation 942 m in the south part of Widmark Ice Piedmont on Stresher Peninsula, Loubet Coast in Graham Land, Antarctica. It is named after the settlement of Gomotartsi in Northwestern Bulgaria.

== Location ==
Gomotartsi Knoll is located at 66°20′36″S 65°30′10″W, which is 17.7 km east-southeast of Cape Bellue, 6.3 km west-southwest of Rugg Peak and 7.78 km northwest of Mount Lyttleton. British mapping in 1976.

== Maps ==
- Antarctic Digital Database (ADD). Scale 1:250000 topographic map of Antarctica. Scientific Committee on Antarctic Research (SCAR). Since 1993, regularly upgraded and updated.
- British Antarctic Territory. Scale 1:200000 topographic map. DOS 610 Series, Sheet W 66 64. Directorate of Overseas Surveys, Tolworth, UK, 1976.

== Notes ==
REMA Explorer
The Reference Elevation Model of Antarctica (REMA) gives ice surface measurements of most of the continent. When a feature is ice-covered, the ice surface will differ from the underlying rock surface and will change over time. To see ice surface contours and elevation of a feature as of the last REMA update,
- Open the Antarctic REMA Explorer
- Enter the feature's coordinates in the box at the top left that says "Find address or place", then press enter
  The coordinates should be in DMS format, e.g. 65°05'03"S 64°01'02"W. If you only have degrees and minutes, you may not be able to locate the feature.
- Hover over the icons at the left of the screen
- Find "Hillshade" and click on that
  In the bottom right of the screen, set "Shading Factor" to 0 to get a clearer image
- Find "Contour" and click on that
  In the "Contour properties" box, select Contour Interval = 1m
  You can zoom in and out to see the ice surface contours of the feature and nearby features
- Find "Identify" and click on that
  Click the point where the contour lines seem to indicate the top of the feature
  The "Identify" box will appear to the top left. The Orthometric height is the elevation of the ice surface of the feature at this point.
