= Stefan Karadzha Peak =

Mountain in Antarctica

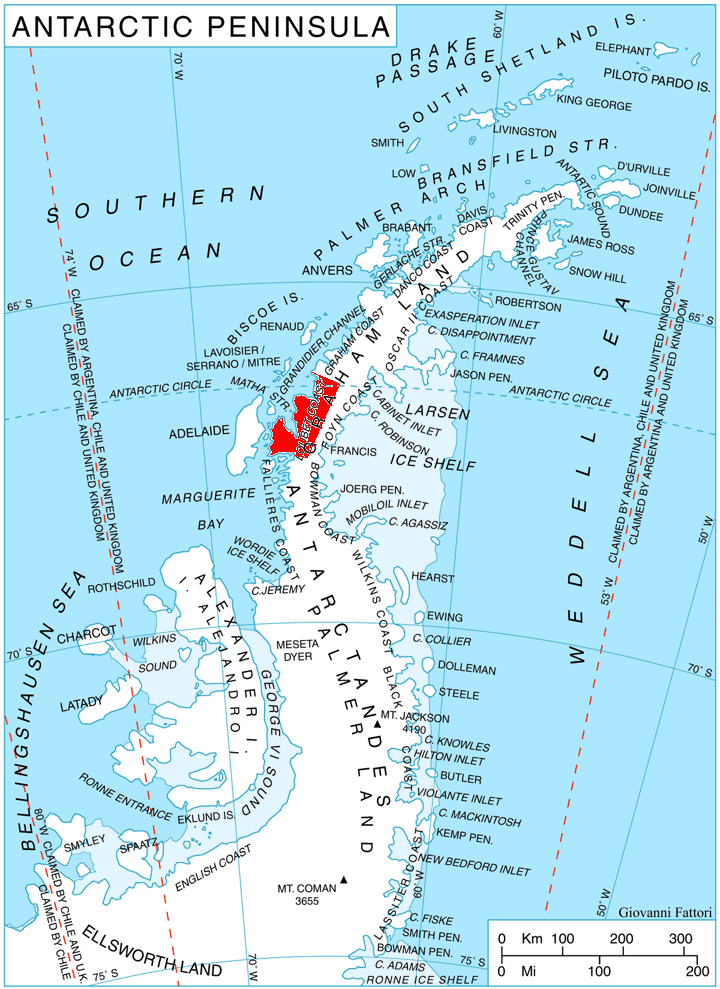
Location of Loubet Coast on the Antarctic Peninsula.

Stefan Karadzha Peak (Bulgarian: връх Стефан Караджа, romanized: vrah Stefan Karadzha, IPA: [ˈvrɤx ˈstɛfɐn kɐrɐˈd͡ʒa]) is the ice-covered peak of elevation 2038 m in the west foothills of Avery Plateau on Loubet Coast in Graham Land, Antarctica. It has rounded top and steep, partly ice-free west and northeast slopes, and surmounts Erskine Glacier to the northeast, and a tributary to that glacier to the south and west.

The peak is named after Stefan Karadzha (Stefan Dimov, 1840–1868), a leader of the Bulgarian liberation movement, in connection with the settlements of Stefan Karadzha in Northeastern and Stefan Karadzhovo in Southeastern Bulgaria.

== Location ==
Stefan Karadzha Peak is located at 66°35′42″S 65°15′30″W, which is 13.9 km northeast of Voit Peak, 7.7 km east of Hadzhi Dimitar Peak, 10 km southeast of Mount Bain, 8 km south of Semela Ridge and 11.54 km north-northwest of Bacharach Nunatak. British mapping in 1976.

== Maps ==
- Antarctic Digital Database (ADD). Scale 1:250000 topographic map of Antarctica. Scientific Committee on Antarctic Research (SCAR). Since 1993, regularly upgraded and updated.
- British Antarctic Territory. Scale 1:200000 topographic map. DOS 610 Series, Sheet W 66 64. Directorate of Overseas Surveys, Tolworth, UK, 1976.
