= Karia Peak =

Summit in Antarctica

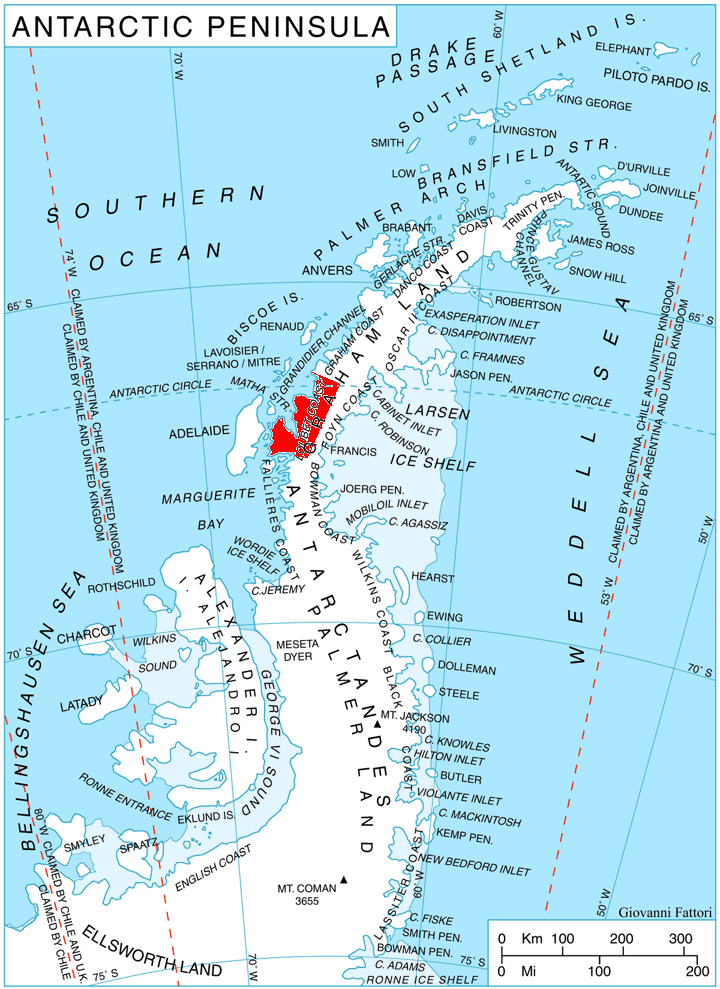
Location of Loubet Coast on the Antarctic Peninsula.

Karia Peak (Bulgarian: връх Кария, romanized: vrah Kariya, IPA: [ˈvrɤx ˈkarijɐ]) is the rounded ice-covered peak rising to 1637 m in the west foothills of Bruce Plateau on Loubet Coast in Graham Land, Antarctica. It has steep and partly ice-free west and south slopes, and surmounts Erskine Glacier to the south and a tributary to that glacier to the west and north.

The peak is named after the ancient town of Karia in Northeastern Bulgaria.

== Location ==
Karia Peak is located at 66°26′35″S 65°20′21″W, which is 5.6 km south-southeast of Mount Lyttleton, 10 km southwest of Purmerul Peak and 13.2 km north-northeast of Mount Bain. British mapping in 1976.

== Maps ==
- Antarctic Digital Database (ADD). Scale 1:250000 topographic map of Antarctica. Scientific Committee on Antarctic Research (SCAR). Since 1993, regularly upgraded and updated.
- British Antarctic Territory. Scale 1:200000 topographic map. DOS 610 Series, Sheet W 66 64. Directorate of Overseas Surveys, Tolworth, UK, 1976.
