= Malus Island =

Island in Antarctica

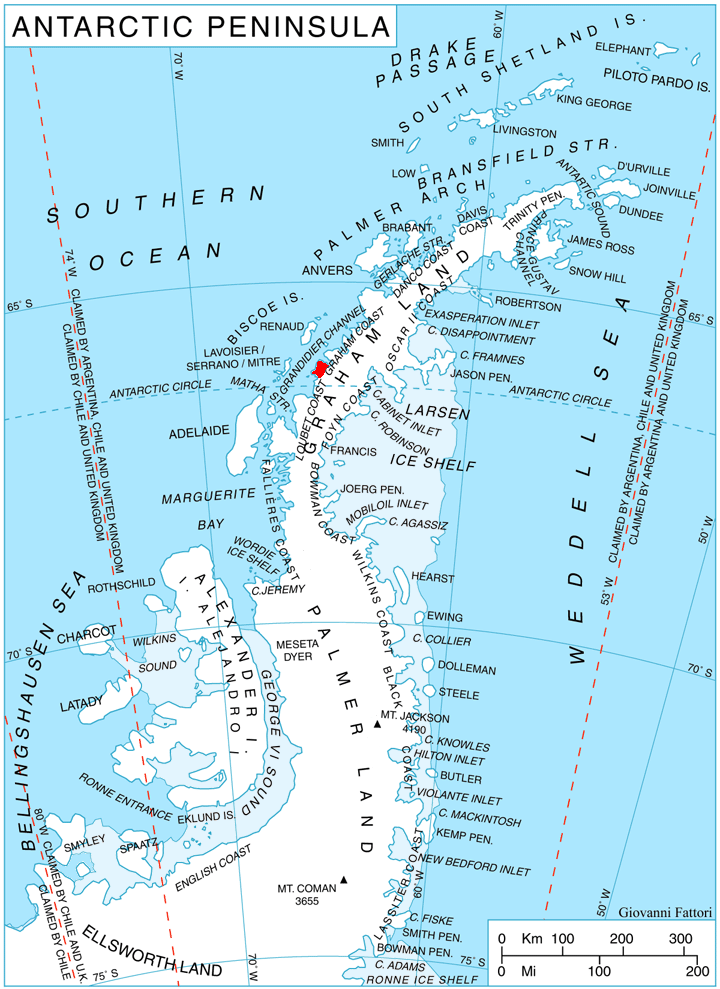
- Location of Stresher Peninsula on Graham Land, Antarctic Peninsula

- Location within Antarctica

Geography
- Location: Antarctica
- Coordinates: 66°14′S 65°45′W

Administration
- Administered under the Antarctic Treaty System

Demographics
- Population: Uninhabited

Malus Island is an island 8 kilometres (4.5 nmi) south of Cape Evensen, lying in Auvert Bay off the northwest coast of Stresher Peninsula, in Graham Land, Antarctica. It was charted by the British Graham Land Expedition under John Rymill, 1934–37, and was named by the UK Antarctic Place-Names Committee in 1960 for French physicist Étienne-Louis Malus, who discovered the polarization of light by reflection, a fact subsequently used in the design of snow goggles.

== See also ==
- List of Antarctic and sub-Antarctic islands
