= Risk Rock =

Risk Rock (66°9′S 65°48′W) is an isolated rock midway between Cape Evensen and Pesky Rocks, off the west coast of Graham Land. Photographed by Hunting Aerosurveys Ltd. in 1956–57, and mapped from these photos by the Falkland Islands Dependencies Survey (FIDS). So named by the United Kingdom Antarctic Place-Names Committee (UK-APC) in 1959 because the rock lies in the route of ships which have passed southward through the channel between Marie Island and the mainland.
