= Hadzhi Dimitar Peak =

Peak in Graham Land, Antarctica

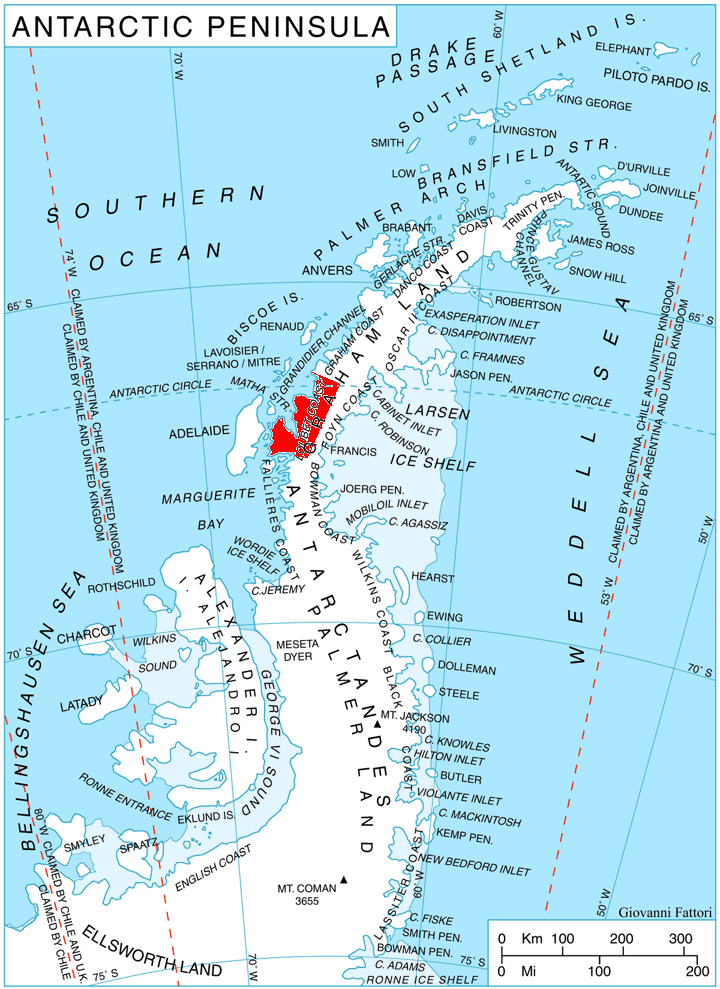
Location of Loubet Coast on the Antarctic Peninsula.

Hadzhi Dimitar Peak (Bulgarian: връх Хаджи Димитър, romanized: vrah Hadzhi Dimitar, IPA: [ˈvrɤx xɐˈd͡ʒi diˈmitɐr]) is the mostly ice-covered peak of elevation 2088 m in the west foothills of Avery Plateau on Loubet Coast in Graham Land, Antarctica. It has steep and partly ice-free west and east slopes, and surmounts Hopkins Glacier to the west and north, and a tributary to that glacier to the southwest.

The peak is named after Hadzhi Dimitar (Dimitar Asenov, 1840–1868), a leader of the Bulgarian liberation movement, in connection with the settlement of Hadzhi Dimitar in Northeastern Bulgaria.

== Location ==
Hadzhi Dimitar Peak is located at 66°36′06″S 65°25′56″W, which is 14.95 km east of Gostilya Point on Darbel Bay, 5.67 km south of Mount Bain, 7.7 km west of Stefan Karadzha Peak and 7.6 km northeast of Voit Peak. British mapping in 1976.

== Maps ==
- Antarctic Digital Database (ADD). Scale 1:250000 topographic map of Antarctica. Scientific Committee on Antarctic Research (SCAR). Since 1993, regularly upgraded and updated.
- British Antarctic Territory. Scale 1:200000 topographic map. DOS 610 Series, Sheet W 66 64. Directorate of Overseas Surveys, Tolworth, UK, 1976.
