= Workman Rocks =

Coordinates: 66°23′S 65°42′W

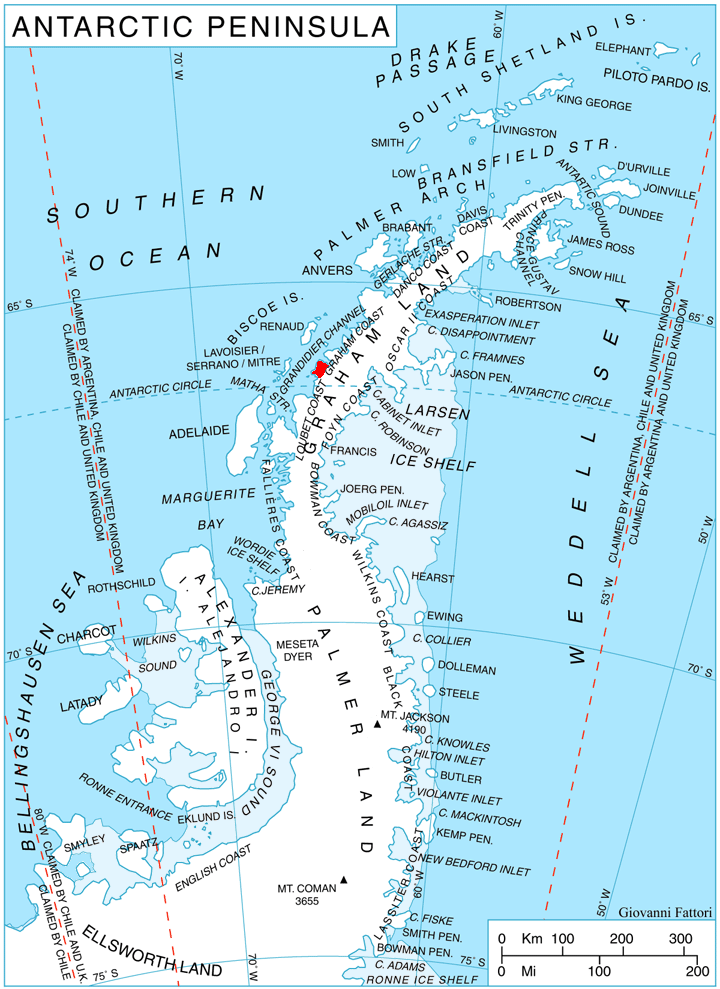
Location of Stresher Peninsula on Graham Land, Antarctic Peninsula.

Workman Rocks is a group of rocks in the northeast part of Darbel Bay just westward of Panther Cliff on the southwest coast of Stresher Peninsula, Graham Land in Antarctica. Photographed by the Falkland Islands and Dependencies Aerial Survey Expedition (FIDASE) in 1956–57. Named by the United Kingdom Antarctic Place-Names Committee (UK-APC) in 1960 for Everley J. Workman, American physicist who has investigated the electrical properties of ice.
