= Purmerul Peak =

Mountain in Antarctica

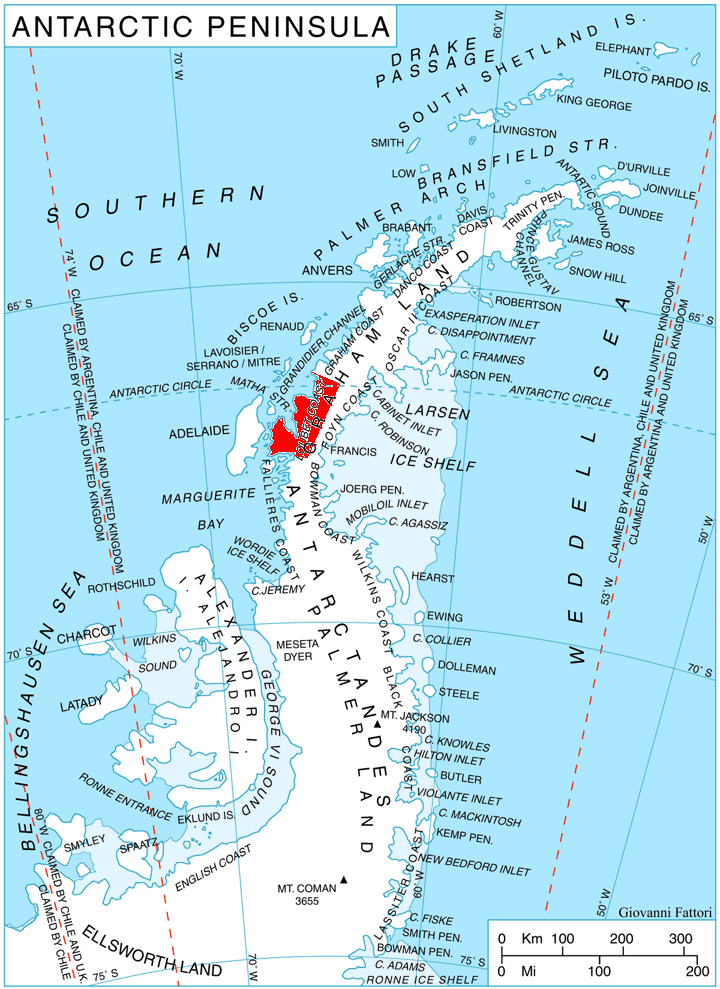
Location of Loubet Coast on the Antarctic Peninsula.

Purmerul Peak (Bulgarian: връх Пурмерул, romanized: vrah Purmerul, IPA: [ˈvrɤx pormɛˈruɫ]) is the ice-covered peak rising to 1915 m in the west foothills of Bruce Plateau on Loubet Coast in Graham Land, Antarctica. It has steep and partly ice-free south and west slopes, and surmounts Hamblin Glacier to the southwest and Hugi Glacier to the north.

The peak is named after the Thracian god Purmerul.

== Location ==
Purmerul Peak is located at 66°23′51″S 65°08′39″W, which is 14.58 km north by east of Semela Ridge, 11.1 km east of Mount Lyttleton, 20 km south-southeast of Crookes Peak and 16.11 km northwest of Slessor Peak. British mapping in 1976.

== Maps ==
- British Antarctic Territory. Scale 1:200000 topographic map. DOS 610 Series, Sheet W 66 64. Directorate of Overseas Surveys, Tolworth, UK, 1976.
- Antarctic Digital Database (ADD). Scale 1:250000 topographic map of Antarctica. Scientific Committee on Antarctic Research (SCAR). Since 1993, regularly upgraded and updated.
