= Marie Island =

Island in Graham Land, Antarctica

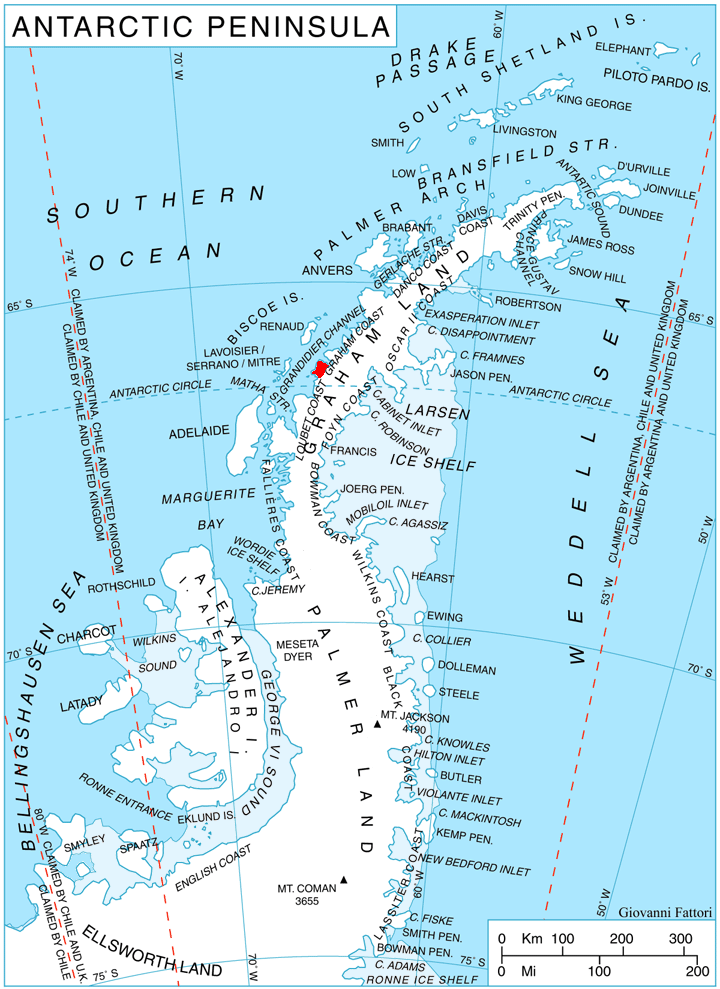
- Location of Stresher Peninsula on Graham Land, Antarctic Peninsula

- Location within Antarctica Location within Antarctic Peninsula

Geography
- Location: Antarctica
- Coordinates: 66°7′S 65°45′W

Administration
- Administered under the Antarctic Treaty System

Demographics
- Population: Uninhabited

Marie Island is an island 4 km (2 nmi) long, which lies immediately north of Cape Evensen on the northwest coast of Stresher Peninsula in Graham Land, Antarctica. The name "Pointe Marie," after the elder sister of Dr. Jean-Baptiste Charcot, was applied by the Third French Antarctic Expedition (1903–05) to a point on the coast close north of Cape Evensen. After the Fourth French Antarctic Expedition (1908–10) Charcot re-applied the name to the southern tip of an island, "Ile Waldeck-Rousseau," in approximately the same latitude. Correlating its survey with those of Charcot, the British Graham Land Expedition (1934–37) identified "Ile Waldeck-Rousseau" as Waldeck-Rousseau Peak on the mainland. The most prominent feature near the peak requiring a name is this island, and the name "Marie Island" preserves Charcot's naming in the locality.

== See also ==
- List of Antarctic and sub-Antarctic islands
