= Owlshead Peak =

Mountain in Antarctica

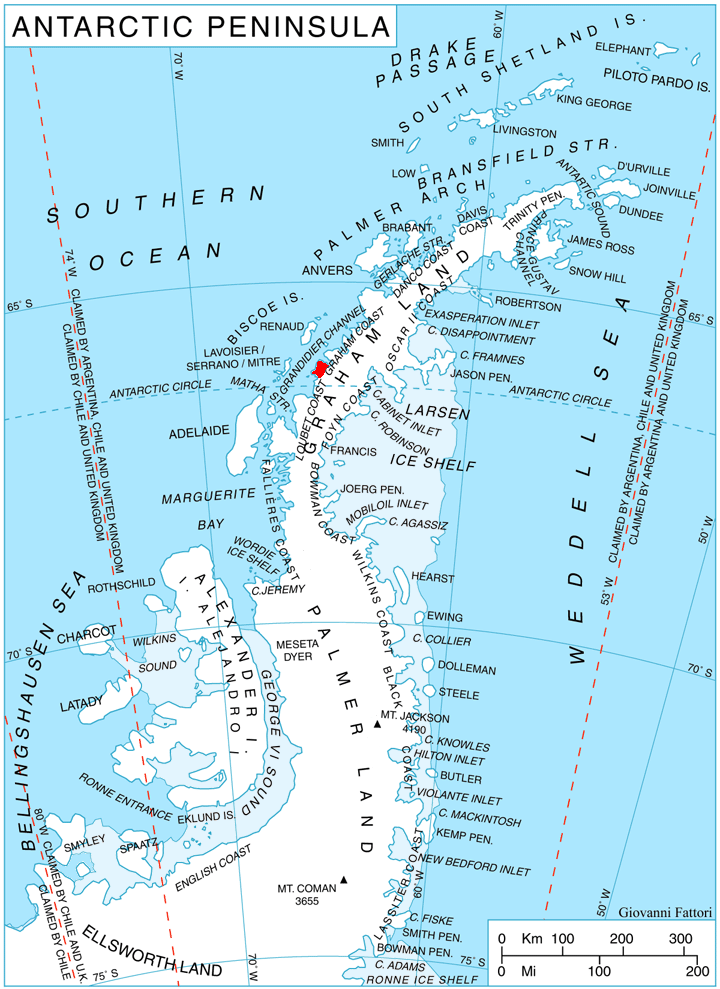
Location of Stresher Peninsula on Graham Land, Antarctic Peninsula.

Owlshead Peak (66°19′S 65°49′W) is a peak 1.5 nautical miles (2.8 km) east of Cape Bellue on Stresher Peninsula on the west coast of Graham Land. Photographed by the Falkland Islands and Dependencies Aerial Survey Expedition (FIDASE) in 1956–57, and roughly surveyed by the Falkland Islands Dependencies Survey FIDS from "Detaille Island", 1956-59. The name is descriptive of the feature when seen from Crystal Sound and Darbel Bay.
