= Crookes Peak =

Mountain in Antarctica

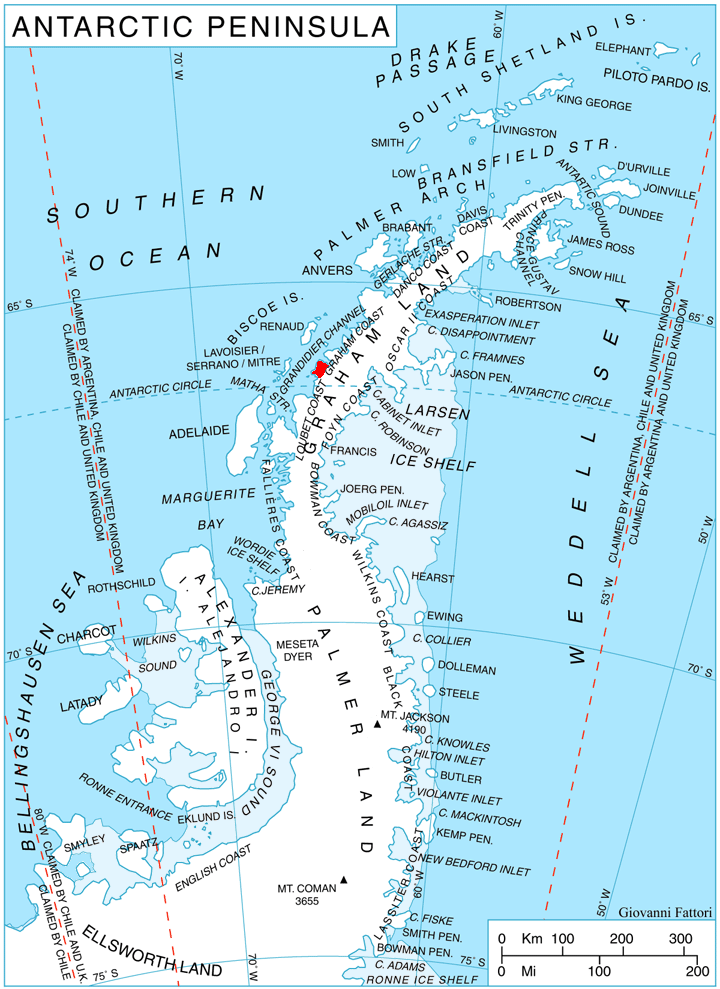
Location of Stresher Peninsula on Graham Land, Antarctic Peninsula.

Crookes Peak (66°14′S 65°18′W) is a peak at the east side of Widmark Ice Piedmont, midway between Stair Hill and Rugg Peak on Stresher Peninsula on the west coast of Graham Land. It was charted by the British Graham Land Expedition of 1934-37 under John Rymill and was named by the UK Antarctic Place-Names Committee in 1959 for Sir William Crookes, an English chemist and physicist whose pioneer work on the optical properties of tinted glass in 1909–13 led to the design of the first satisfactory snow goggles and the prevention of snow blindness.
