= Waldeck-Rousseau Peak =

Mountain in Antarctica

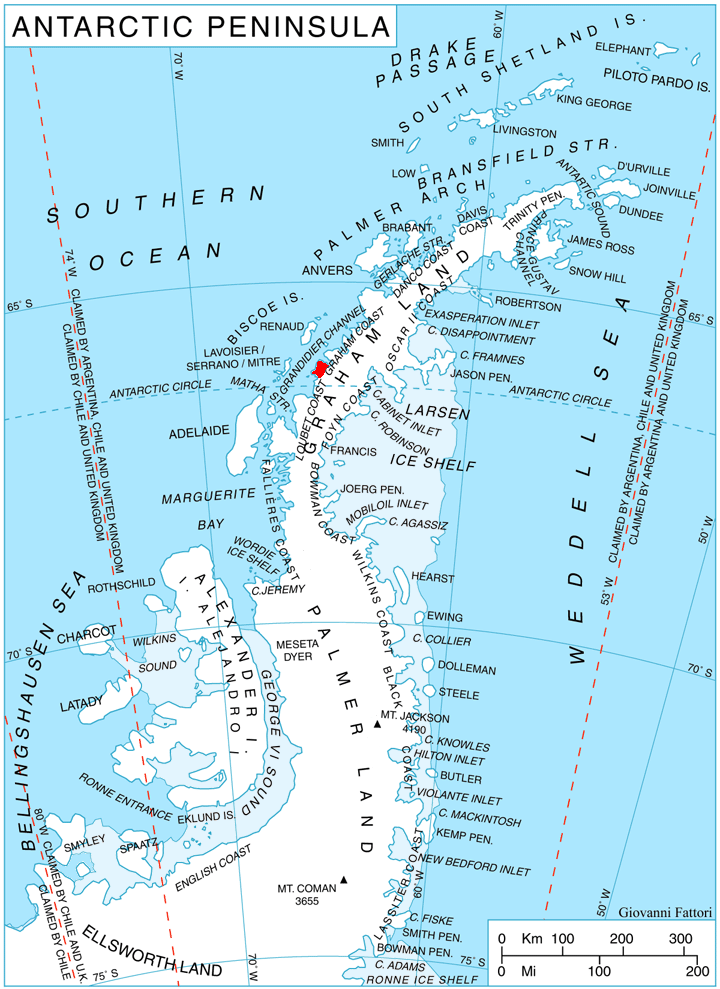
Location of Stresher Peninsula on Graham Land, Antarctic Peninsula.

Waldeck-Rousseau Peak (66°9′S 65°38′W) is a conspicuous monolith 3 nautical miles (6 km) east-northeast of Cape Evensen on Stresher Peninsula on Graham Coast, Antarctic Peninsula. The French Antarctic Expedition (1903–05) under Jean-Baptiste Charcot charted a cape in this area which they named for French statesman Pierre Waldeck-Rousseau. On re-exploring this area, the French Antarctic Expedition (1908–10) under Charcot sighted the feature from Pendleton Strait, 25 nautical miles (46 km) distant, and charted it as an island near the coast. Correlating its work with that of Charcot, the British Graham Land Expedition (BGLE) under John Rymill charted this portion of the coast by land and from the air in 1935. Waldeck-Rousseau Peak as here applied is in accord with the interpretation of the BGLE.
