= Panther Cliff =

Topographical feature in Antarctica

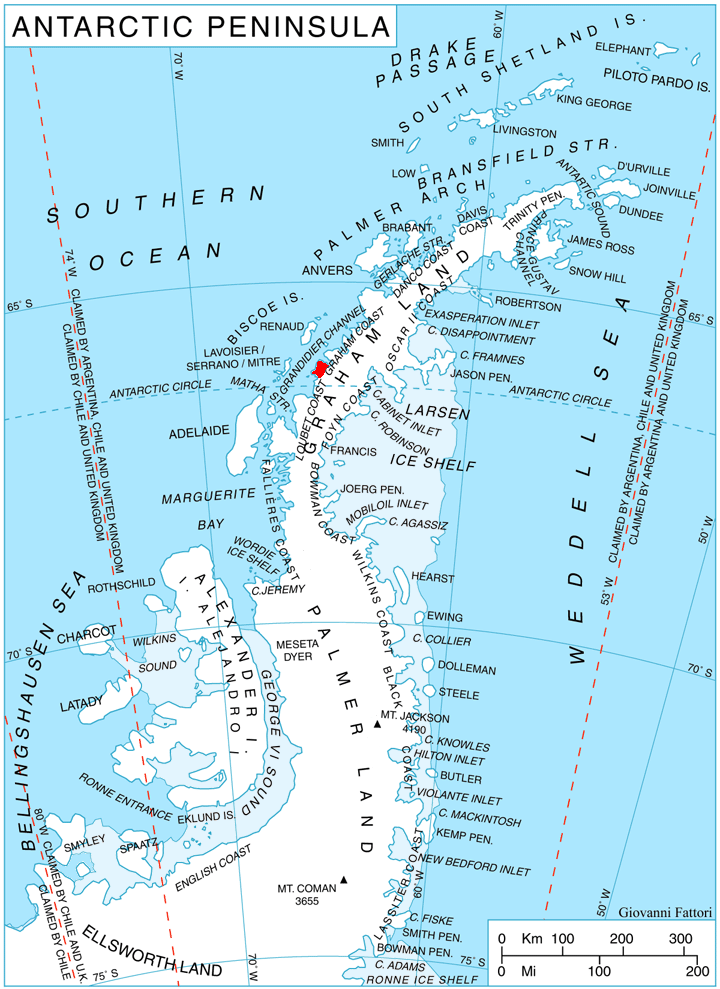
Location of Stresher Peninsula on Graham Land, Antarctic Peninsula.

Panther Cliff (66°23′S 65°36′W) is a conspicuous cliff on the southwest side of Stresher Peninsula on the west coast of Graham Land, Antarctica. It is situated at the northeast corner of Darbel Bay, just north of the mouth of Cardell Glacier. Photographed by the Falkland Islands and Dependencies Aerial Survey Expedition (FIDASE) in 1956–57. The name is descriptive of the appearance of the cliff, which is a landmark for parties sledging in Darbel Bay.
