= Lawson Peak =

Mountain in Antarctica

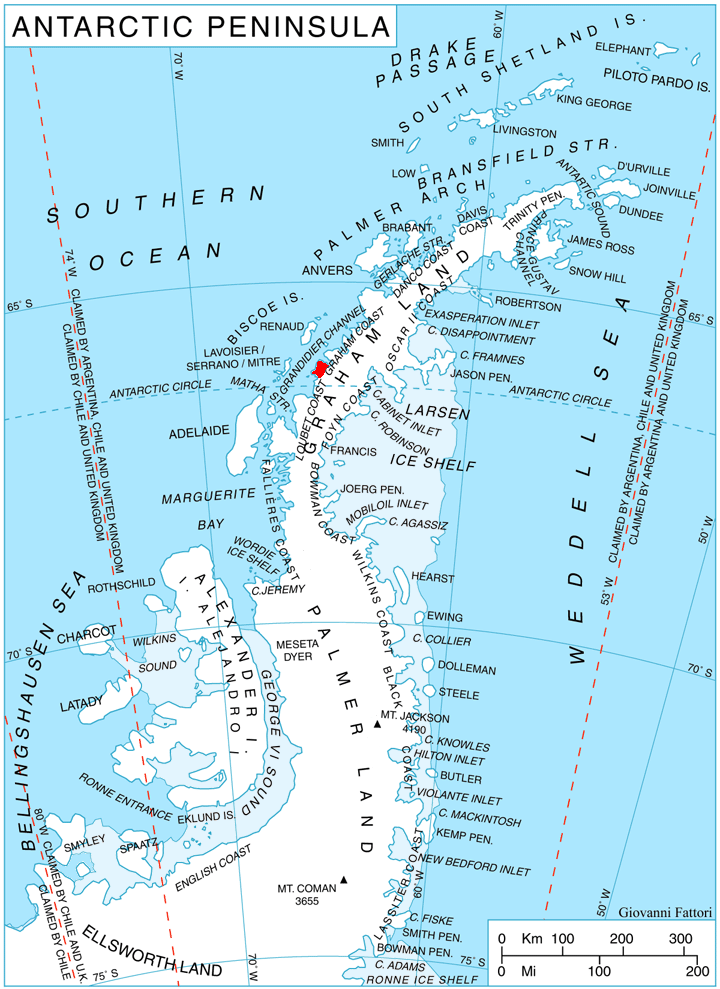
- Location of Stresher Peninsula on Graham Land, Antarctic Peninsula.

Highest point
- Elevation: 600 m (2,000 ft)
- Coordinates: 66°11′S 65°36′W

Geography
- Location: Graham Land, Antarctica

Lawson Peak is a peak 3.5 nautical miles (6 km) southeast of Cape Evensen on Stresher Peninsula on the west coast of Graham Land, Antarctica. It was photographed by Hunting Aerosurveys Ltd in 1956–57, and mapped from these photos by the Falkland Islands Dependencies Survey. The peak was named by the UK Antarctic Place-Names Committee in 1960 for Sir Arnold Lawson (1867–1947), an English ophthalmic surgeon whose work in tinted glass contributed to improvements in the protective qualities of snow goggles. The peak is a prominent landmark when seen from the southwest.
