= Byway Glacier =

Glacier in Antarctica

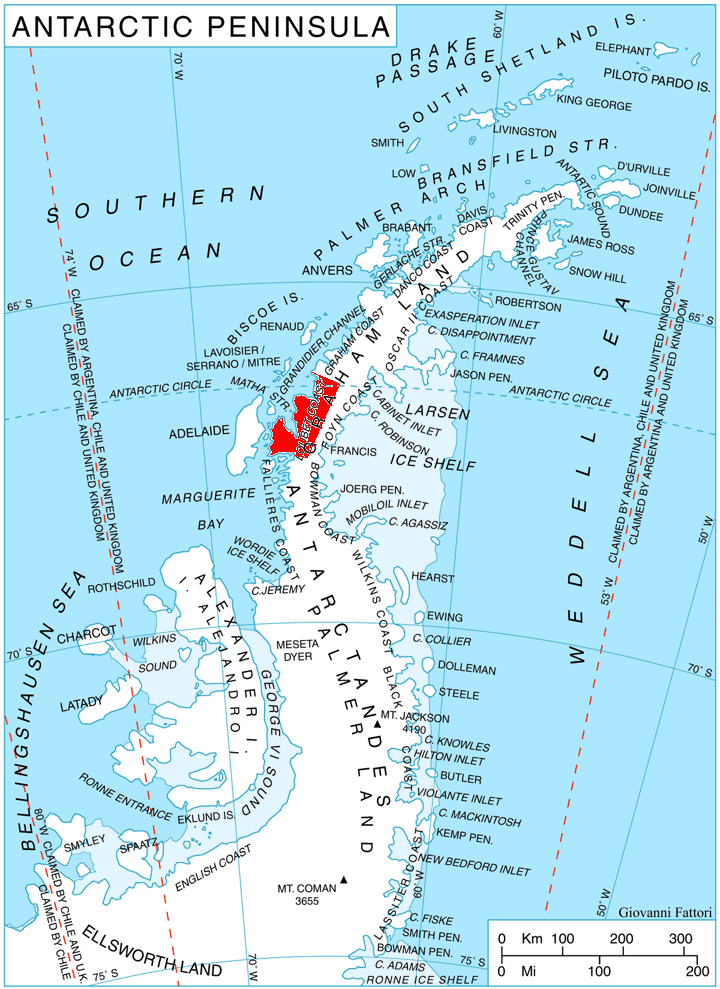
- Location of Loubet Coast on the Antarctic Peninsula

- Location within Antarctica
- Location: Graham Land
- Coordinates: 66°30′00″S 65°12′00″W
- Thickness: unknown
- Highest elevation: 1,603 m (5,259 ft)
- Terminus: Erskine Glacier
- Status: unknown

Byway Glacier (66°30′S 65°12′W) is a glacier flowing west from Slessor Peak and joining Erskine Glacier just southwest of Aleksandrov Peak in Graham Land, Antarctica.

== History ==
Byway Glacier was photographed by Hunting Aerosurveys Ltd in 1955–57, and mapped from these photos by the Falkland Islands Dependencies Survey. The glacier was so named by the UK Antarctic Place-Names Committee in 1958 because the sledging route up this glacier is not as good as that along the main route up Erskine Glacier.

== See also ==
- List of glaciers in the Antarctic
- Glaciology
