= Shanty Point =

Shanty Point (66°25′S 65°38′W) is a small point within Darbel Bay, lying close west of the mouth of Cardell Glacier on the west coast of Graham Land. Photographed by Hunting Aerosurveys Ltd. in 1955–57, and mapped from these photos by the Falkland Islands Dependencies Survey (FIDS). So named by the United Kingdom Antarctic Place-Names Committee (UK-APC) because, when seen from a distance, a large rectangular boulder on the point has the appearance of a small hut with a crooked chimney.
