= Stefan Karadzha =

Bulgarian revolutionary (1840–1868)

- Стефан Караджа
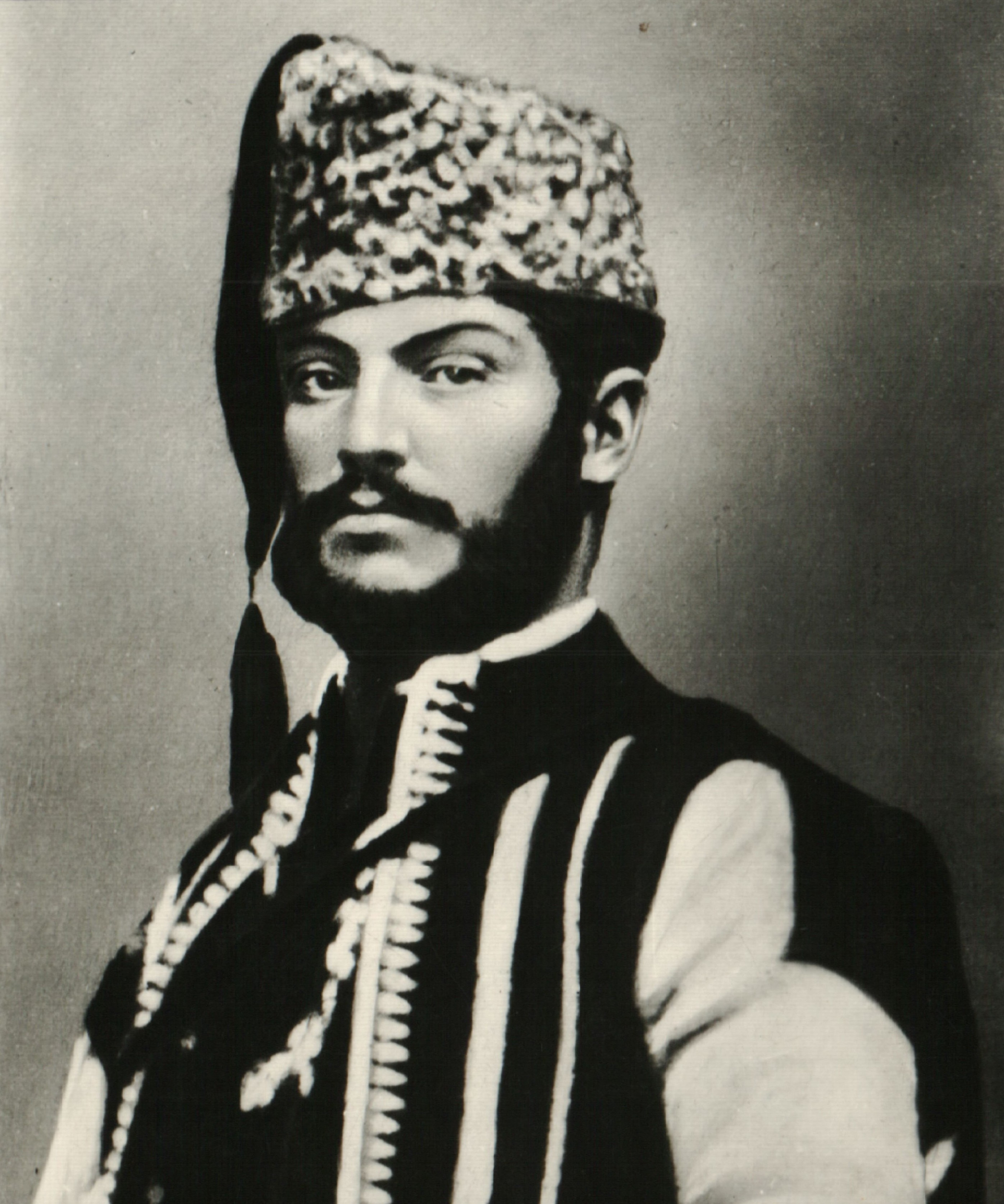
- Born: Stefan Todorov Dimov; 11 May 1840; Içme, Ottoman Empire
- Died: 31 July 1868 (aged 28); Rusçuk, Ottoman Empire

Stefan Karadzha (Bulgarian: Стефан Караджа, pronounced [ˈstɛfɐn kɐrɐˈd͡ʒa]; 11 May 1840 – 31 July 1868) (Note: His surname has been also rendered as Karadja.) was a Bulgarian revolutionary from the national liberation movement and a cheta leader. He attempted to start a rebellion against the Ottoman Empire.

== Life ==
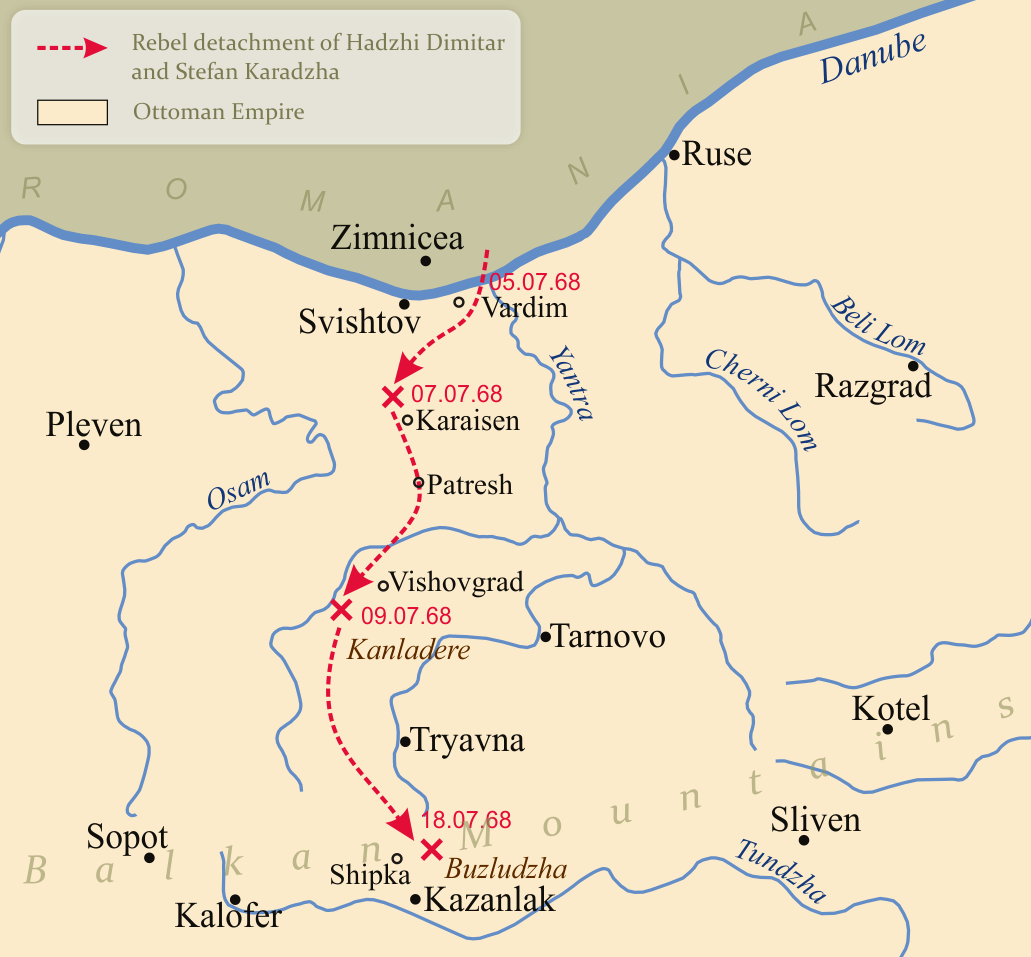
Actions of the rebel detachment of Hadzhi Dimitar and Stefan Karadzha in 1868.

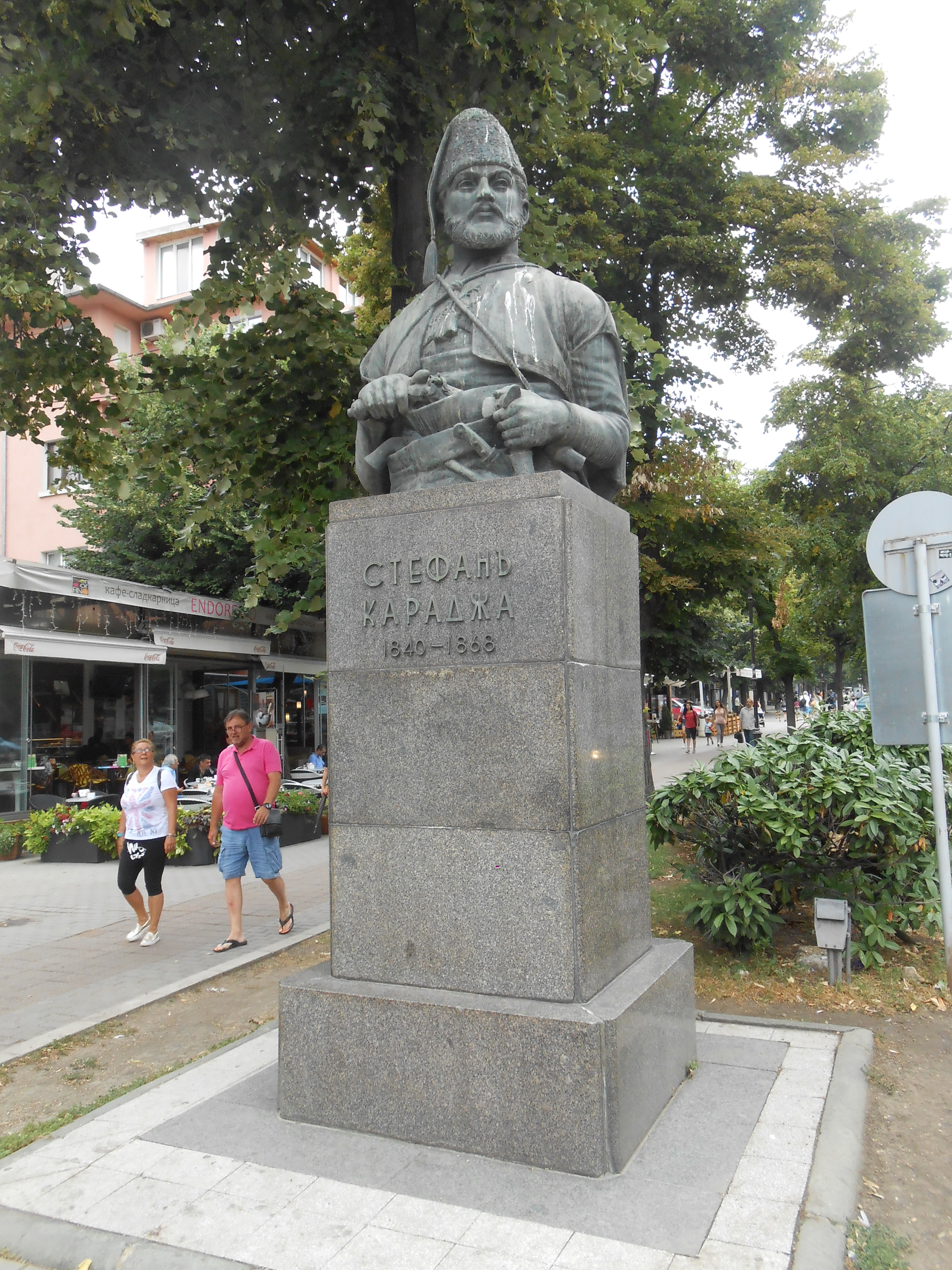
Monument to Stefan Karadzha, Varna

He was born as Stefan Todorov Dimov (Стефан Тодоров Димов) in the village of Ichme (now Stefan Karadzhovo), near Yambol in Rumelia, and was reputedly a descendant of Momchil Voyvoda. Karadzha studied in Tulcea, Dobruja, but quit school due to lack of funding. During a wedding celebration, he defeated the famous Turkish wrestler Gaazi Plisa. Going into hiding for some time, as Ottoman authorities were searching for him, he then emigrated to Principality of Romania and later joined the First Bulgarian Legion in Belgrade, Principality of Serbia.

Karadzha crossed the Danube from Wallachia a couple of times, carrying out revolutionary tasks. In 1867, he joined the Second Bulgarian Legion, which he quit the following year before returning to Romania, where he had a meeting with Hadzhi Dimitar. On 6 June, both of them were leaders of a detachment of 129 people, and crossed the Danube at Vardim, near Svishtov. Their cheta was supposed to get to Stara Planina and establish a revolutionary government there which would then command a general uprising of all Bulgarians. This was not to happen, though, as the group was discovered by Turkish forces shortly after crossing the river. Stefan Karadzha was badly wounded during the fight at Kanladere near Vishovgrad, and was captured by the army and police sent by the chairman of the State Council, Midhat Pasha. Afterwards, on 12 July, he was transported to Tarnovo, and later to Rousse.

Karadzha was standing half-dead before the emergency Turkish court, assembled by Midhat Pasha, the so-called criminal council, and sentenced to death by hanging, but died from his wounds before the execution. He was buried by Tonka Obretenova, who preserved his skull.

== Honours ==
Stefan Karadzha Peak on Graham Land, Antarctica is named after Stefan Karadzha.
