= Hadzhi Dimitar (village) =

- Village
- Location in Bulgaria
- Coordinates: 43.474°N 28.445°E
- Country: Bulgaria
- Province: Dobrich Province
- Municipality: Kavarna
- Time zone: UTC+2 (EET)
  - Summer (DST): UTC+3 (EEST)

Hadzhi Dimitar is a village in Kavarna Municipality, Dobrich Province, northeastern Bulgaria.

Hadzhi Dimitar Peak on Graham Land, Antarctica is named after the village.
