= Hadzhi Dimitar =

Bulgarian voivode and revolutionary

- Хаджи Димитър
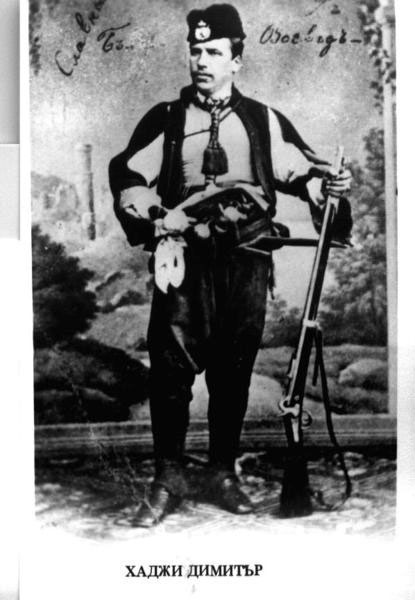
- Born: Dimitar Nikolov Asenov; 10 May 1840; İslimiye, Sanjak of İslimiye, Adrianople Eyalet, Ottoman Empire (today Sliven, Bulgaria)
- Died: 10 August 1868 (aged 28); Buzluca, Sanjak of Filibe, Adrianople Vilayet, Ottoman Empire (today Buzludzha, Bulgaria)
- Cause of death: Fallen in battle
- Resting place: Sliven, Bulgaria
- Occupation: Revolutionary

Dimitar Nikolov Asenov (Bulgarian: Димитър Николов Асенов [diˈmitɐr niˈkɔlof ɐˈsɛnof]; 10 May 1840 – 10 August 1868), better known as Hadzhi Dimitar (Хаджи Димитър [ˈhad͡ʒi diˈmitɐr]), was one of the most prominent Bulgarian voivode and revolutionaries working for the Liberation of Bulgaria from Ottoman rule.

== Biography ==
=== Early life ===
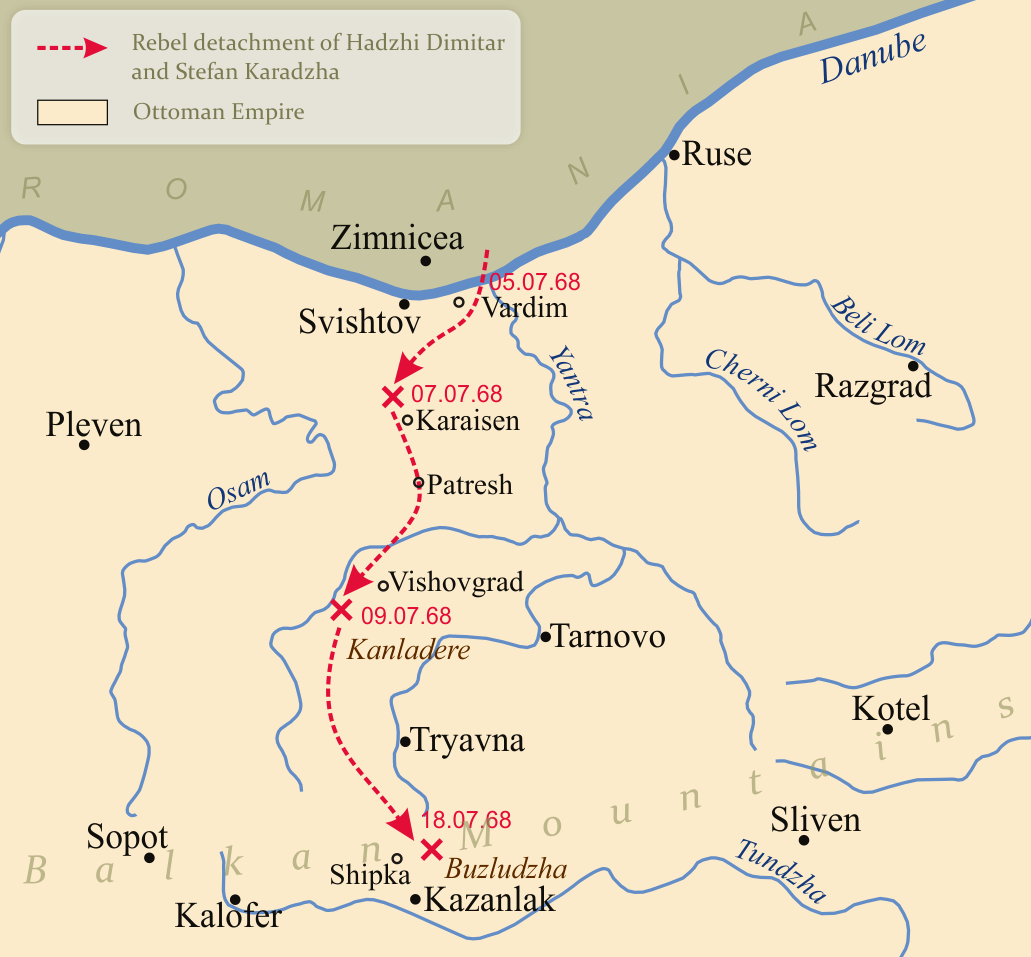
Actions of the rebel detachment of Hadzhi Dimitar and Stefan Karadzha in 1868.

Dimitar was born in Sliven (İslimiye), which was then part of the Ottoman Empire, to the family of the merchant Nikola Asenov and his wife Marinka Asenova. When he was two years old, his family went on a pilgrimage to Jerusalem, from which point onward, Dimitar was considered to be a hajji (хаджия). During Hadzhi Stavri's Uprising of 1862, Hadzhi Dimitar wandered through the Balkan Mountains with a band of revolutionaries for the whole summer.

=== Early revolutionary work ===
He joined the band of Stoyan Voyvoda in 1864 as a standard bearer. The band consisted of twelve people and was formed after the murder of the Greek bishop of Veliko Tarnovo. However, it disbanded before entering the city, and its members separated from their leader. Hadzhi Dimitar assumed command and led the band into the Balkan Mountains near Sliven and then to Romania in August.

Another band was formed in the home of Georgi Sava Rakovski on 21 May 1865. Among its members were Hadzhi Dimitar, Stefan Karadzha, Yurdan Yurdanov, Petar Shivarov and Todor Shivarov. The band crossed the Danube near Silistra on 13 June and headed for the mountains near Kotel through the Ludogorie. It was active in the region of the Tundzha, Tvarditsa, Karlovo, Gabrovo and the well-known hajduk gathering place Aglikina Polyana. This band returned to Romania in August 1865.

A 20-member band crossed the Danube from Romania in the summer of 1866. It was led by Dyado Zhelyo, Hadzhi Dimitar, and Stefan Karadzha. It split into three after reaching the mountains and was active until the autumn, when it regrouped to return to Romania.

=== Hadzhi Dimitar and Stefan Karadzha's band ===
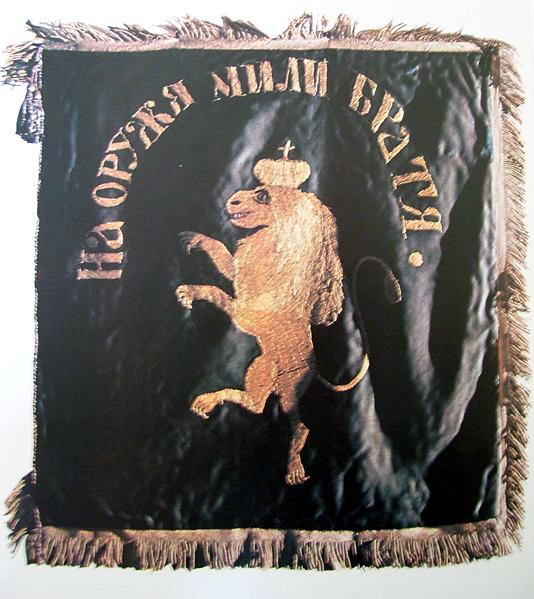
Flag of Hadzhi Dimitar and Stefan Karadzha's band. Inscription: На оружя мили братя (In Bulgarian: Take up arms dear brothers

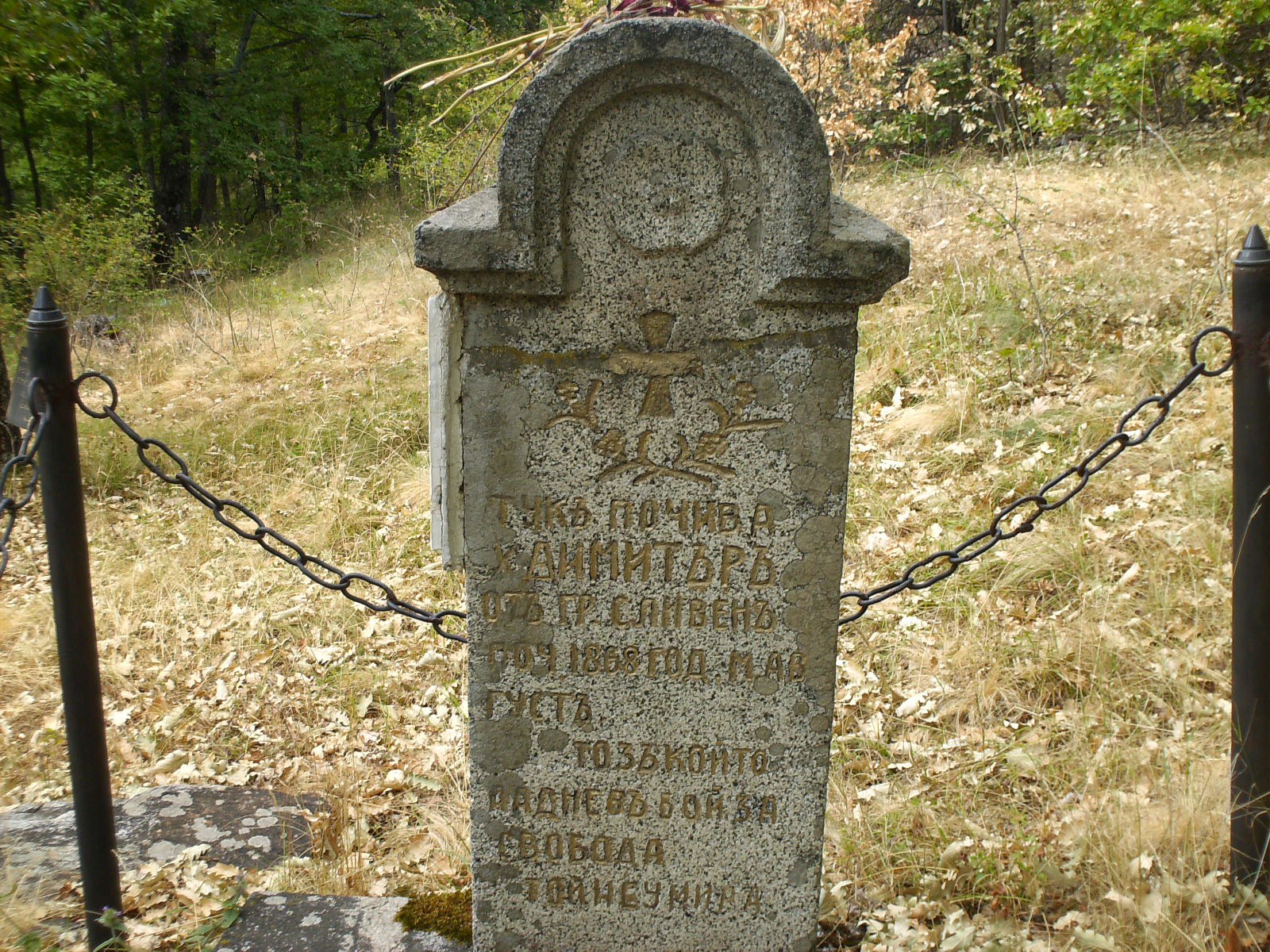
The Grave of Hadzhi Dimitar beneath the Mount Kadrafill, near to village of Svezhen

The band of Hadzhi Dimitar and Stefan Karadzha was established in Romania in 1868. Many of the members had been participants in the unsuccessful Belgrade-based Second Bulgarian Legion. Dimitar's band crossed the Danube at Vardim in a sailboat on 5 July and engaged in a battle with an Ottoman pursuing party of a thousand men in the vineyards of Karaisen, near Pavlikeni. The band managed to give the enemy the slip and reached the territory of Gorna Lipitsa. A second battle followed there on 7 July, in which the band caused considerable damage to the Ottomans while only losing one member and two others being wounded. The band proceeded to Vishovgrad, where it also fought on 8 July. The next day, not far to the south-southeast, there was a bloody fight in which Karadzha was wounded and captured, and the band was defeated. The remaining 58 members proceeded to the Balkan Mountains under the leadership of Hadzhi Dimitar, only to be crushed at Buzludzha Peak on 18 July. After being defeated in this last battle, leader Hadzhi Dimitar, heavily wounded, was carried on a stretcher by his surviving comrades away from the Ottoman army, up Mount Kadrafill, 3 km from the village of Svezhen. There, he and his comrades were supported by the local people with water, food, and herbs, until his death somewhere around the middle of August 1868. He was buried beneath the same mountain. On 6 November 1880, his bones were reburied in the yard of the "St.Peter and St.Paul" Church in the village of Svezhen. The funeral service was conducted by the Bishop of Plovdiv Gervassius of Levkia, who made Hadzhi Dimitar a martyr. After nearly two months, the bones of the hero were requested by and given to his mother, who brought them to his birthplace in Sliven. His death inspired Hristo Botev's poem "Hadzhi Dimitar" in 1873:

He who falls while fighting to be free
can never die: for him the sky
and earth, the trees and beasts shall keen,
to him the minstrel's song shall rise…

== Honours ==
Hadzhi Dimitar Peak on Graham Land, Antarctica is named after Hadzhi Dimitar.

Roads and neighbourhoods in several cities and towns in Bulgaria are named after Hadzhi Dimitar.

Subway Station Hadzhi Dimitar Metro Station is named after Hadzhi Dimitar.
