= Pesky Rocks =

Pesky Rocks (66°9′S 65°54′W) is a small group of rocks lying 3.5 nautical miles (6 km) west of Cape Evensen, off the west coast of Graham Land. Shown on a Chilean government chart of 1947. So named by the United Kingdom Antarctic Place-Names Committee (UK-APC) in 1959 because the rocks obstruct an otherwise clear shipping route.
