= Wooden Peak =

Mountain in Antarctica

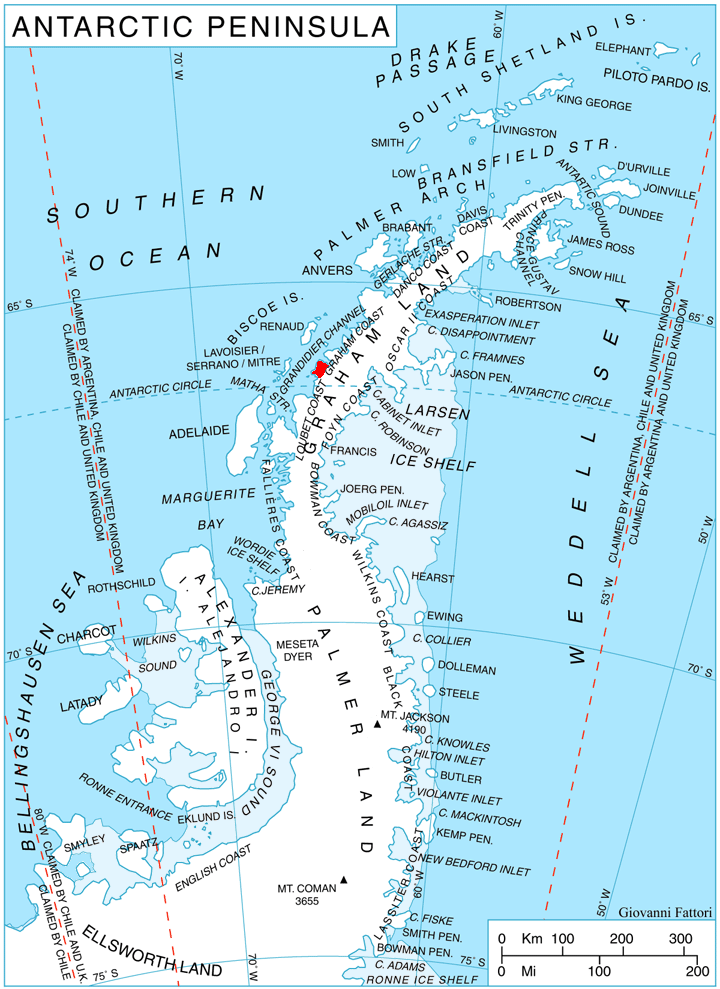
Location of Stresher Peninsula on Graham Land, Antarctic Peninsula.

Wooden Peak (66°8′S 65°35′W) is a peak 2 nautical miles (3.7 km) southeast of Black Head on Stresher Peninsula on the west coast of Graham Land. Charted by the British Graham Land Expedition (BGLE) under Rymill, 1934–37. Named by the United Kingdom Antarctic Place-Names Committee (UK-APC) in 1959 for Frederick E. Wooden, Falkland Islands Dependencies Survey (FIDS) surveyor at Danco Island in 1956 and at Prospect Point in 1957. Wooden was also attached to the British Naval Hydrographic Survey Unit which worked in the area in 1957–58.
