= Auvert Bay =

Bay in Antarctica

Coordinates: 66°14′S 65°45′W

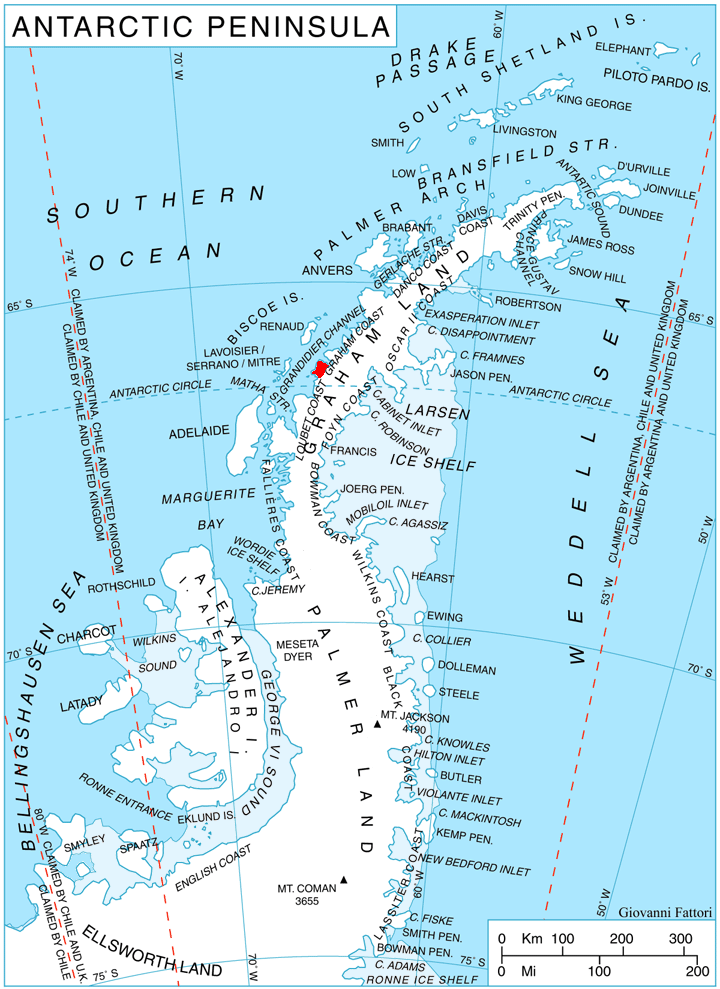
Location of Stresher Peninsula on Graham Land, Antarctic Peninsula.

Auvert Bay is a bay 8 miles (13 km) wide, indenting the coast for 3 miles (5 km) between Cape Evensen and Cape Bellue, along the northwest coast of Stresher Peninsula, Graham Land in Antarctica. It was discovered by the French Antarctic Expedition, 1908–10, and named "Baie Auvert" ("bay far from anywhere").
