= Rugg Peak =

Mountain in Antarctica

Rugg Peak (66°19′S 65°23′W) is a peak on the east side of Widmark Ice Piedmont south of Crookes Peak, on the west coast of Graham Land. Photographed by Hunting Aerosurveys Ltd in 1956–57, it was mapped from these photos by the Falkland Islands Dependencies Survey (FIDS). It was named by the United Kingdom Antarctic Place-Names Committee (UK-APC) in 1959 after Andrew Rugg-Gunn, an English ophthalmic surgeon, who, in 1934, brought together relevant data on radiation and protective glasses to improve the design of snow goggles.
