= Stefan Karadzhovo =

Stefan Karadzhovo Стефан Караджово
- Village
- Location within Bulgaria
- Coordinates: 42.2167°N 26.8333°E
- Country: Bulgaria
- Province: Yambol
- Community: Bolyarovo

Area
  - Total: 47,234 km^{2} (18,237 sq mi)
- Elevation: 230 m (750 ft)

Population
  - Total: 492
- Time zone: UTC+2 (EET)
  - Summer (DST): UTC+3 (EEST)
- Post code: 8725
- Area code: 04742

Stefan Karadzhovo (Bulgarian: Стефан Караджово) is a village in Yambol Province, south Bulgaria.

== Geography ==
Stefan Karadzhovo is located at 40 km from Yambol, 11 km away from Bolyarovo and 65 km from Burgas. The village is situate on the skate of the Strandzha mountain.

== History ==
One of the legends for the village is that it was founded by farmers near to Krastavyat kladenets (mangy well). The old name of the village was Ichme. In 1763 was built the Orthodox church "Uspenie bogorodichno", which is among the oldest churches in Yambol Province.

== Cultural and natural attractions ==
- House of Stefan Karadzha

== Personalities ==
- Stefan Karadzha (1840-1868) - Bulgarian revolutionary

== Honours ==
Stefan Karadzha Peak on Graham Land, Antarctica is named after the village.
