= Cardell Glacier =

Glacier in Antarctica

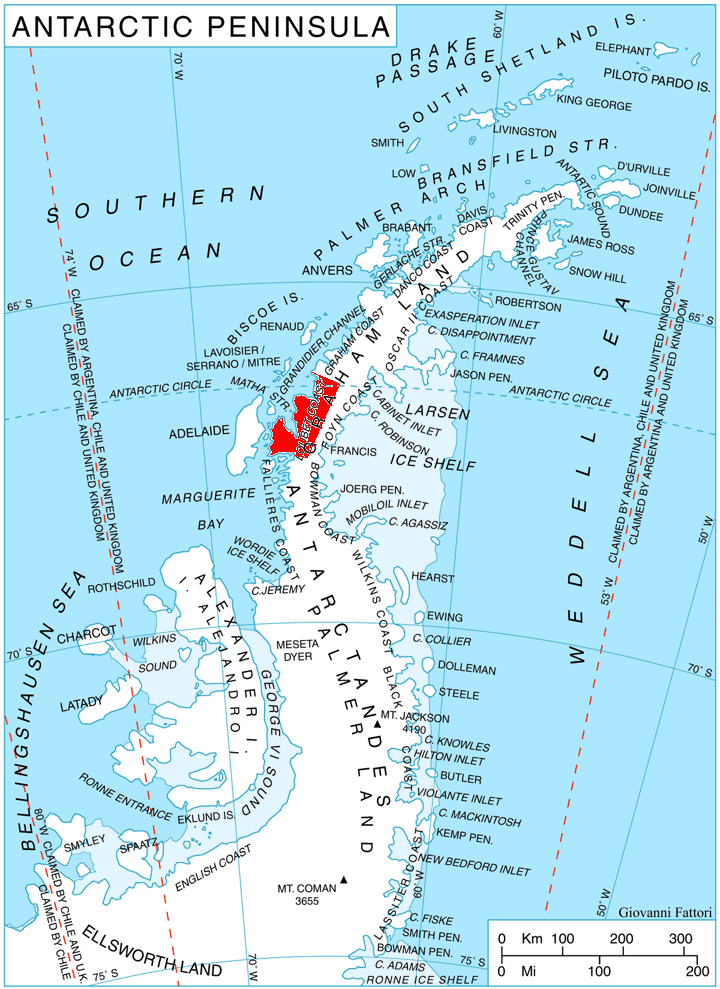
- Location of Loubet Coast on the Antarctic Peninsula

- Location within Antarctica
- Location: Graham Land
- Coordinates: 66°25′00″S 65°32′00″W
- Thickness: unknown
- Highest elevation: 539 m (1,768 ft)
- Terminus: Goodwin Glacier
- Status: unknown

Cardell Glacier (66°25′S 65°32′W) is a glacier draining the north slopes of Roygos Ridge and flowing northwestwards into Darbel Bay between Shanty Point and Panther Cliff, on the west coast of Graham Land, Antarctica.

== History ==
Cardell Glacier was photographed by Hunting Aerosurveys Ltd in 1955–57, and mapped from these photos by the Falkland Islands Dependencies Survey. The glacier was named by the UK Antarctic Place-Names Committee in 1959 for John D.M. Cardell, English ophthalmic surgeon, who evolved the first satisfactory snow goggle design combining adequate protection and ventilation with safety and sufficient visual field.

== See also ==
- List of glaciers in the Antarctic
- Glaciology
