= Stair Hill =

Stair Hill (66°10′S 65°14′W) is a hill at the south side of the head of Holtedahl Bay, on the west coast of Graham Land, Antarctica. Photographed by Hunting Aerosurveys Ltd. in 1956–57, and mapped from these photos by the Falkland Islands Dependencies Survey (FIDS). Named by the United Kingdom Antarctic Place-Names Committee (UK-APC) in 1959 for Ralph Stair of the U.S. National Bureau of Standards, whose work on the transmissive properties of tinted glass has contributed to the design of satisfactory snow goggles.
