= Cape Bellue =

Headland in Graham Land, Antarctica

Coordinates: 66°18′S 65°53′W

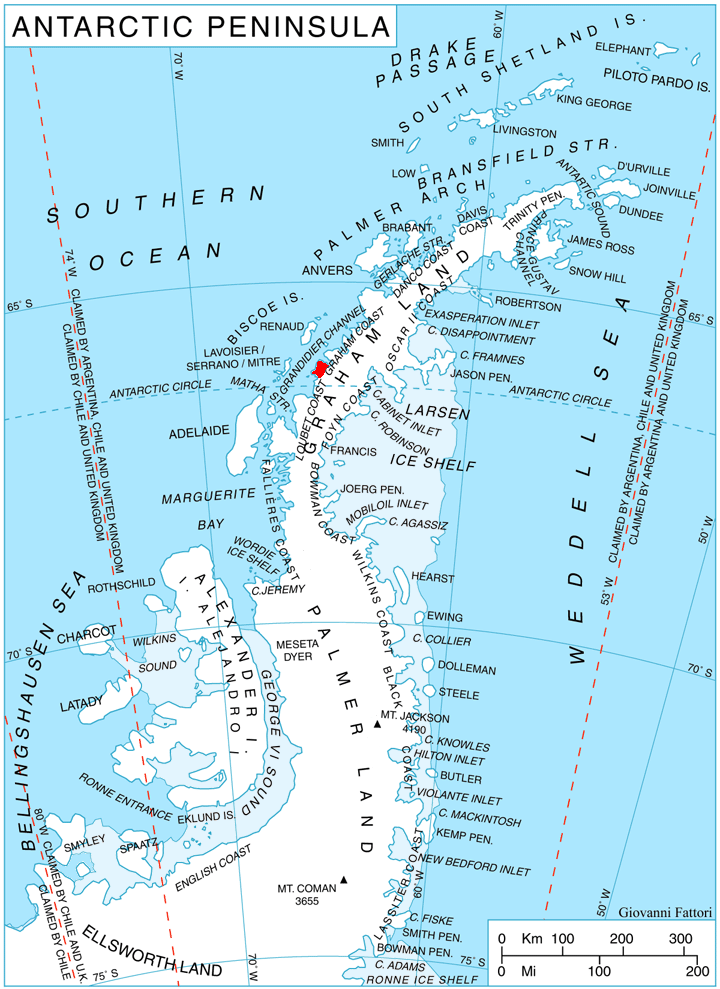
Location of Stresher Peninsula on Graham Land, Antarctic Peninsula

Cape Bellue is a headland on the north side of the entrance to Darbel Bay, which forms the west extremity of Stresher Peninsula on the west coast of Graham Land, Antarctica. It separates Graham Coast to the northeast from Loubet Coast to the southwest. Discovered by the French Antarctic Expedition, 1908–1910, under Charcot, and named by him for Admiral Bellue, Superintendent of the Dockyard at Cherbourg, France. The cape was roughly mapped by BGLE in August–September 1935 and called in error "Cape Evensen". The cape was photographed from the air by FIDASE and surveyed from the ground by FIDS from Detaille Island, 1956–57.
