= Bacharach Nunatak =

Nunatak in Graham Land, Antarctica

Bacharach Nunatak (66°41′S 65°11′W) is a conspicuous nunatak overlooking the north arm of Drummond Glacier, in Graham Land. It was photographed by Hunting Aerosurveys Ltd in 1955–57, and mapped from these photos by the Falkland Islands Dependencies Survey. It was named by the UK Antarctic Place-Names Committee in 1958 for Alfred L. Bacharach, English biochemist, whose work on nutrition solved many problems of sledging rations.
