= Slessor Peak =

Mountain in Antarctica

Slessor Peak (66°31′S 64°58′W) is a mainly ice-covered peak, 2,370 m, standing at the southwest end of Bruce Plateau in Graham Land, Antarctica, close northwest of Gould Glacier.

It rises about 300 m above the general level of the plateau ice sheet and has a steep rock face on its north side. It was first surveyed in 1946–47 by a Falkland Islands Dependencies Survey (FIDS) sledge party led by Robert S. Slessor, FIDS medical officer at Stonington Island, for whom the peak is named.
