= Avery Plateau =

Plateau in Antarctica

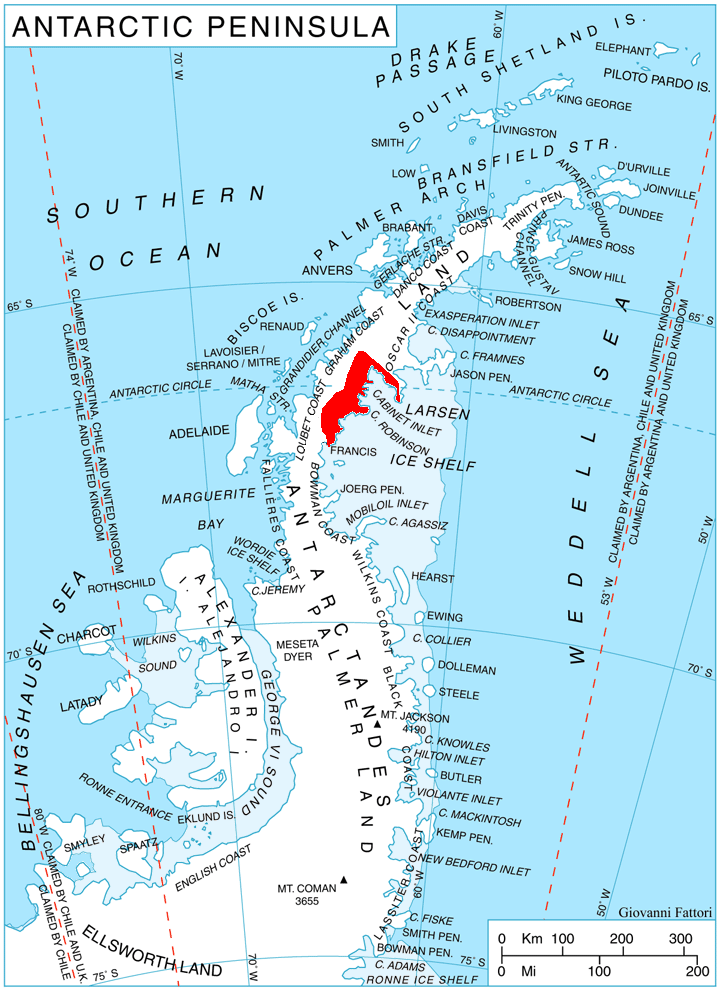
Location of Foyn Coast on Antarctic Peninsula.

Avery Plateau (66°50′S 65°30′W) is an ice-covered plateau, about 40 miles (64 km) long and rising to about 2,000 metres (6,600 ft), midway between Loubet Coast and Foyn Coast in Graham Land, Antarctica. It borders the Hemimont Plateau on the south and the Bruce Plateau on the north. The first sighting of this plateau is still being determined. Still, it was presumably seen in January and February 1909 by members of the French Antarctic Expedition under Jean-Baptiste Charcot from various positions in the Matha Strait. It was surveyed in 1946–47 by the Falkland Islands Dependencies Survey and named by the UK Antarctic Place-Names Committee (1955) after Captain George Avery, master of the cutter Lively, who, with Captain John Biscoe in the brig Tula, approached this part of the Antarctic Peninsula in February 1832.
