= Widmark Ice Piedmont =

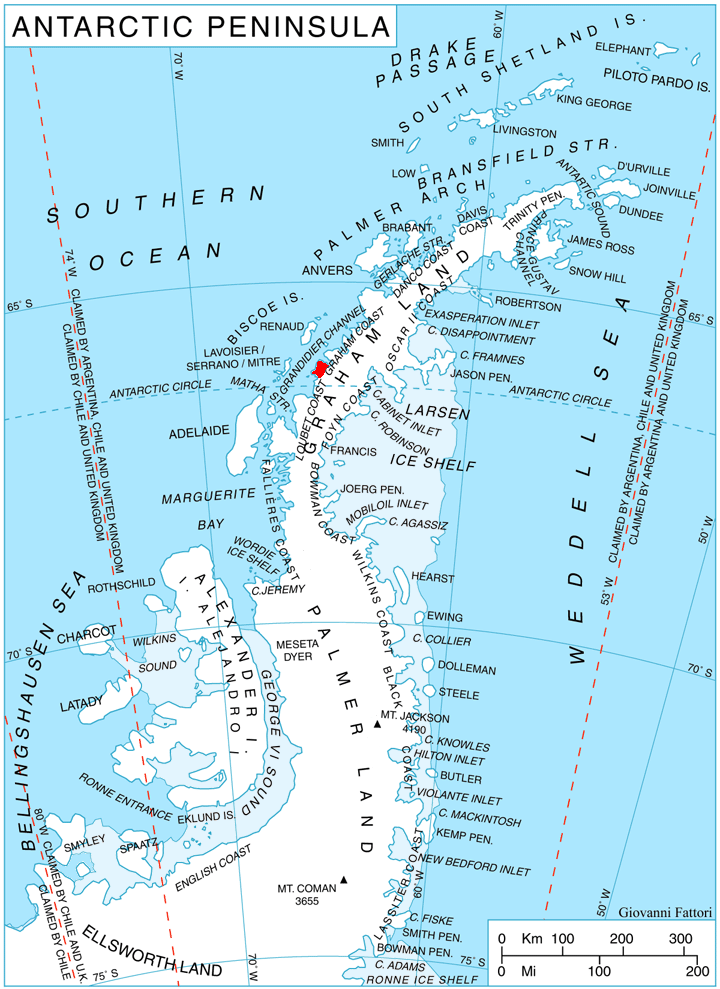
Location of Stresher Peninsula on Graham Land, Antarctic Peninsula.

Widmark Ice Piedmont (66°17′S 65°30′W) is an ice piedmont between Holtedahl and Darbel bays on Stresher Peninsula on the west coast of Graham Land. Photographed by Hunting Aerosurveys Ltd in 1955-57, it was mapped from these photos by the Falkland Islands Dependencies Survey (FIDS). It was named by the United Kingdom Antarctic Place-Names Committee (UK-APC) in 1959 after Erik J. Widmark (1850–1909), a Swedish ophthalmologist and pioneer of researches upon the etiology and treatment of snow blindness.
