= Bruce Plateau =

Plateau in Antarctica

Bruce Plateau (66°S 64°W) is an ice-covered plateau, at least 90 nautical miles (170 km) long and about 1,830 metres (6,000 ft) high, extending northeast from the heads of Gould Glacier and Erskine Glacier to the vicinity of Flandres Bay, in Graham Land. It borders Avery Plateau on the south and Forbidden Plateau on the north. The first sighting of this plateau has not been ascertained, but it was presumably seen in January 1909 by members of the French Antarctic Expedition under Jean-Baptiste Charcot from their position in Pendleton Strait. The plateau was mapped from aerial photographs and from Falkland Islands Dependencies Survey surveys, 1946–62, and named by the UK Antarctic Place-Names Committee after William S. Bruce, a Scottish polar explorer and leader of the Scottish National Antarctic Expedition, 1902–04.
