= Mount Lyttleton =

Mountain in Graham Land, Antarctica

Mount Lyttleton (66°24′S 65°22′W) is a conspicuous, almost entirely snow-covered mountain near the head of Cardell Glacier, on the west coast of Graham Land, Antarctica. It was photographed from the air by the Ronne Antarctic Research Expedition under Finn Ronne, 1947–48, and was named by the UK Antarctic Place-Names Committee in 1960 for Westcote R. Lyttleton (1877–1956), New Zealand Works Director of Triplex Safety Glass, London, who first introduced laminated safety glass for use in goggles in about 1912.
