= Darbel Bay =

Bay in Graham Land, Antarctica

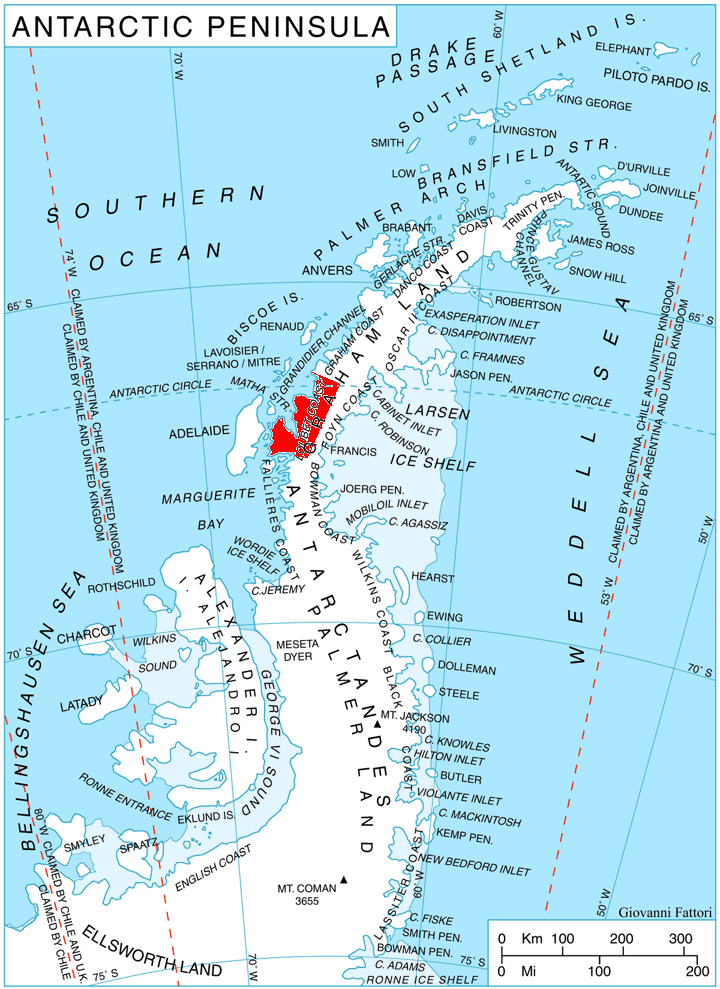
Location of Loubet Coast on Antarctic Peninsula.

Darbel Bay (66°30′S 65°55′W) is a bay 25 nautical miles (50 km) wide, indenting the west coast of Graham Land between Stresher Peninsula and Pernik Peninsula. Entered southwest of Cape Bellue and northeast of Cape Rey. The glaciers Widmark Ice Piedmont, Cardell, Erskine, Hopkins, Drummond, Widdowson, McCance, Solun, and Škorpil feed the bay.

It was discovered and roughly charted by the French Antarctic Expedition, 1908–10, under Jean-Baptiste Charcot, who gave it the name Baie Marin Darbel. The bay was further charted in 1931 by Discovery Investigations personnel on the Discovery II, and by the British Graham Land Expedition, 1934–37, under John Rymill.

== Maps ==
- Antarctic Digital Database (ADD). Scale 1:250000 topographic map of Antarctica. Scientific Committee on Antarctic Research (SCAR), 1993–2016.
