= Mount Bain =

Mountain in Graham Land, Antarctica

Highest point
- Elevation: 1,980 m (6,500 ft)
- Prominence: 1,062 m (3,484 ft)
- Listing: Ribu

Mount Bain (66°33′S 65°26′W) is a mountain, 2,090 m, standing between Hopkins and Erskine Glaciers on the west coast of Graham Land. It was named by the United Kingdom Antarctic Place-Names Committee (UK-APC) in 1958 for James S. Bain of London, who specialized in the development of polar and high altitude rations, with special emphasis on plastic vacuum packaging, between 1948 and 1956.
