= Stresher Peninsula =

Peninsula in Antarctica

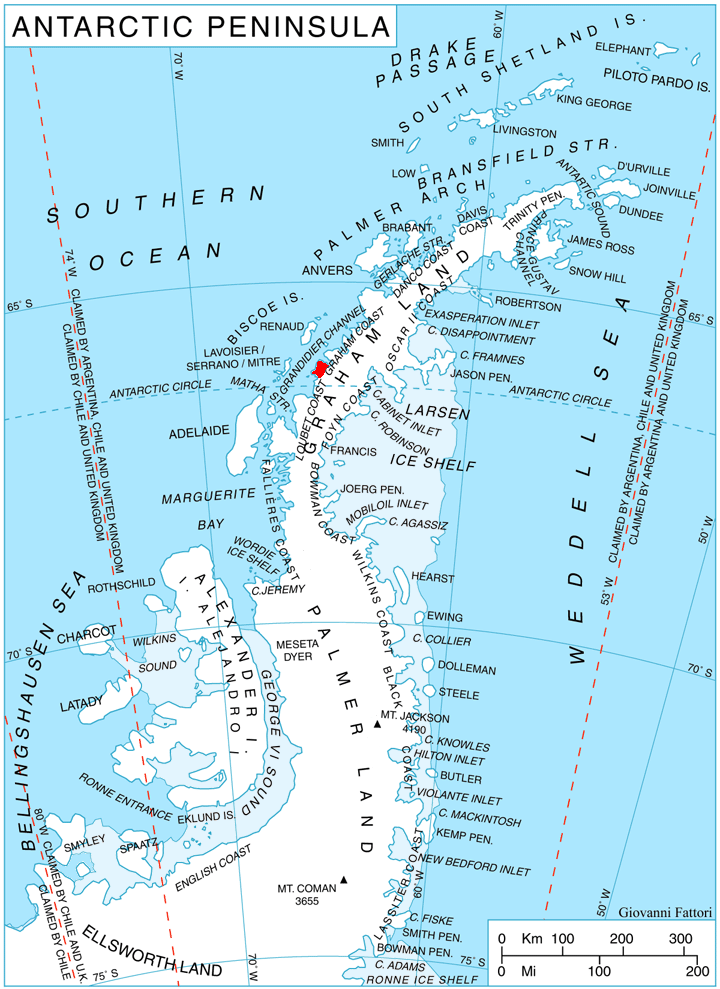
Location of Stresher Peninsula on Graham Land, Antarctic Peninsula.

Stresher Peninsula (Bulgarian: полуостров Стрешер, romanized: poluostrov Stresher, IPA: [poɫuˈɔstrof ˈstrɛʃɛr]; 66°16′10″S 65°26′40″W) is the predominantly ice-covered rectangular peninsula 30 km wide and projecting 24 km northwestwards from Graham Land, Antarctic Peninsula. It is bounded by Holtedahl Bay to the northeast, Auvert Bay to the northwest and Darbel Bay to the southwest. Its west extremity Cape Bellue separates Graham Coast to the northeast from Loubet Coast to the southwest. Lawson Peak is a peak 3.5 nautical miles (6 km) southeast of Cape Evensen.

The feature is named after Stresher Peak in the Balkan Mountains, Bulgaria.

== Maps ==
- British Antarctic Territory. Scale 1:200000 topographic map. DOS 610 Series, Sheet W 66 64. Directorate of Overseas Surveys, Tolworth, UK, 1976.
- Antarctic Digital Database (ADD). Scale 1:250000 topographic map of Antarctica. Scientific Committee on Antarctic Research (SCAR), 1993–2016.

== See also ==
- Owlshead Peak
- Wooden Peak
- Workman Rocks
