= Erskine Glacier =

Glacier in Antarctica

Erskine Glacier (66°29′S 65°40′W) is a glacier 16 nautical miles (30 km) long on the west coast of Graham Land, flowing west into Darbel Bay to the north of Hopkins Glacier. It was first surveyed by the Falkland Islands Dependencies Survey (FIDS) in 1946–47, and named "West Gould Glacier". With East Gould Glacier it was reported to fill a transverse depression across Graham Land, but further survey in 1957 showed no close topographical alignment between the two. The name Gould has been limited to the east glacier and an entirely new name, for Angus B. Erskine, leader of the first FIDS party to travel down the glacier and to survey it in detail, has been approved for the west glacier.
