= Cape Evensen =

Headland in Antarctica

Coordinates: 66°9′S 65°44′W

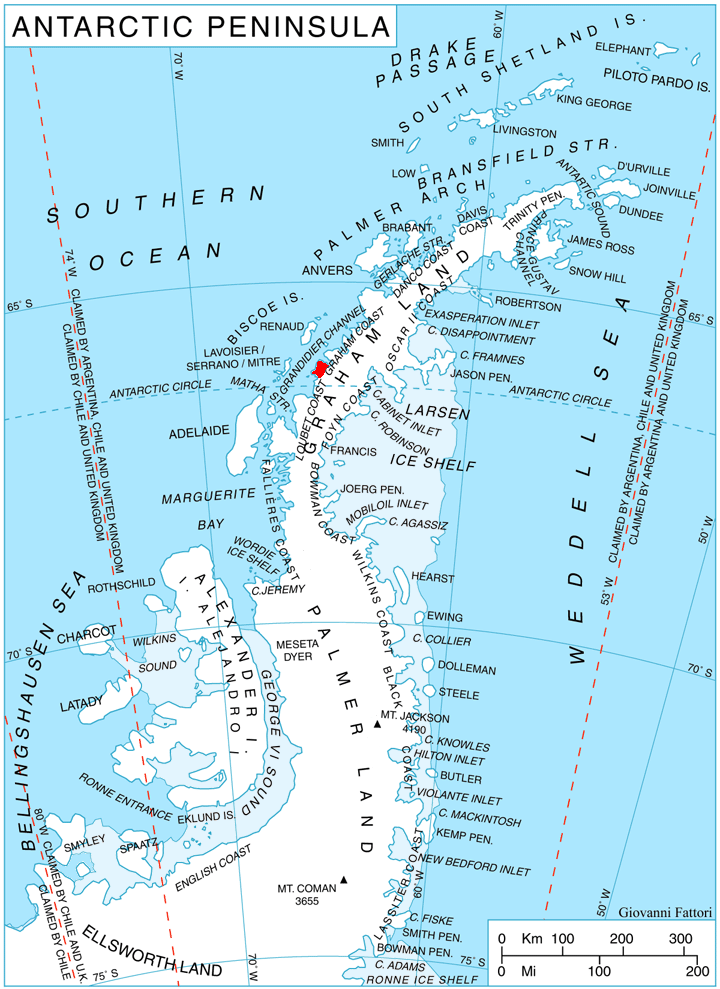
Location of Stresher Peninsula on Graham Land, Antarctic Peninsula.

Cape Evensen is a cape forming the north side of the entrance to Auvert Bay, on the northwest coast of Stresher Peninsula, Graham Land in Antarctica. It was discovered by the French Antarctic Expedition, 1903–05, and named by Jean-Baptiste Charcot for Captain C.J. Evensen of the Hertha, who explored along the west coast of the Antarctic Peninsula in 1893.

== Important Bird Area ==
The site has been identified as an Important Bird Area (IBA) by BirdLife International because it supports a breeding colony of about 180 pairs of imperial shags. Other birds reported as breeding there include kelp gulls and skuas.
