= Bregare Point =

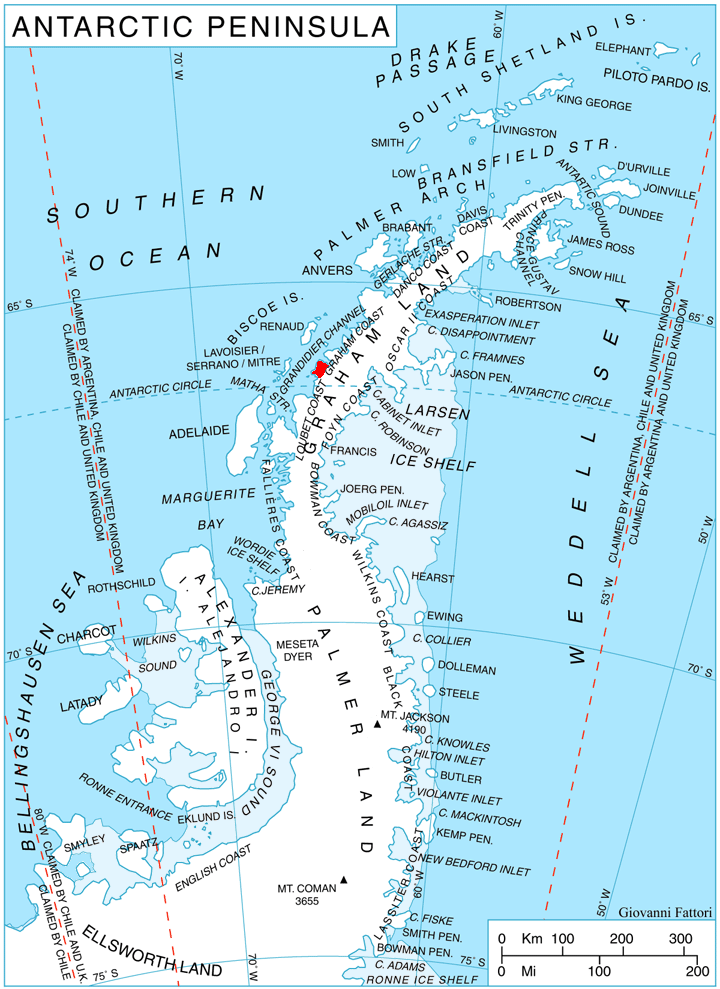
Location of Stresher Peninsula on Graham Land, Antarctic Peninsula.

Bregare Point (Bulgarian: нос Брегаре, ‘Nos Bregare’ \'nos bre-'ga-re\) is the point projecting 2 km into Crates Bay on the northeast coast of Stresher Peninsula on Graham Coast in Graham Land, Antarctica. It is named after the settlement of Bregare in Northern Bulgaria.

== Location ==
Bregare Point is located at 66°09′50″S 65°24′55″W, which is 5.1 km south-southeast of Starmen Point, 1.4 km southeast of Conway Island and 3 km southwest of the point formed by Lens Peak. British mapping in 1976.

== Maps ==
- Antarctic Digital Database (ADD). Scale 1:250000 topographic map of Antarctica. Scientific Committee on Antarctic Research (SCAR). Since 1993, regularly upgraded and updated.
- British Antarctic Territory. Scale 1:200000 topographic map. DOS 610 Series, Sheet W 66 64. Directorate of Overseas Surveys, Tolworth, UK, 1976.
