= Bregare =

Bregare Брегаре
- Village
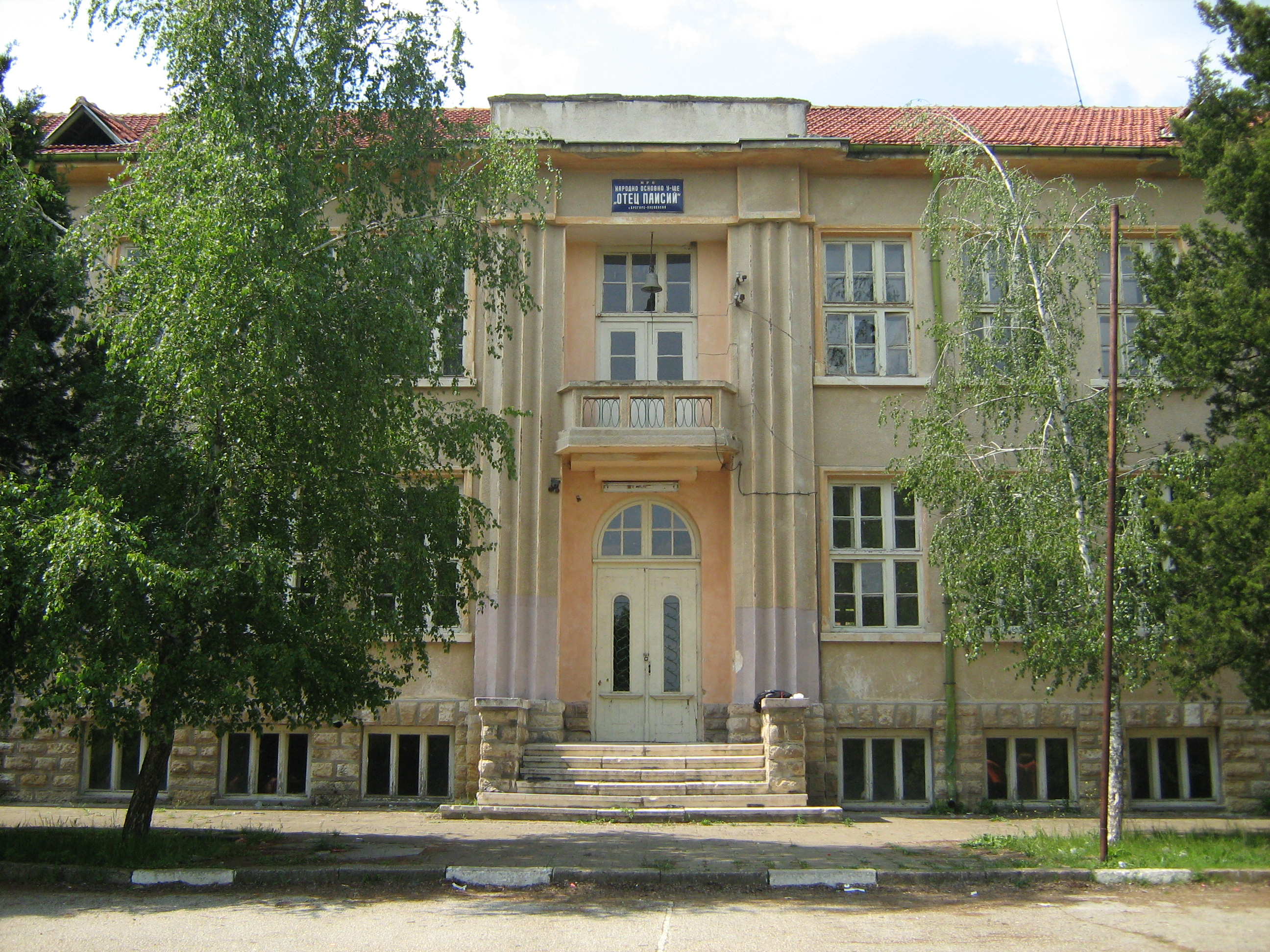
- School in Bregare

- Location of Bregare
- Coordinates: 43°35′43″N 24°19′51″E
- Country: Bulgaria
- Province (Oblast): Pleven
- Municipality (Obshtina): Dolna Mitropoliya
- First settled: 1868

Government
  - Mayor: Tsvetan Velchovski

Area
  - Land: 29.907 km^{2} (11.547 sq mi)
- Elevation: 41 m (135 ft)

Population (2020)
  - Total: 612
- Time zone: UTC+2 (EET)
  - Summer (DST): UTC+3 (EEST)
- Postal Code: 5862

Bregare (Bulgarian: Брегаре [brɛˈɡarɛ], lit. 'riverside people') is a village in central northern Bulgaria, part of Dolna Mitropoliya municipality, Pleven Province. Bregare lies on the left bank of the Iskar River, 15 kilometres (9.3 mi) from its mouth in the Danube, at an elevation of around 40 metres (130 ft).

== Geography ==
The village of Bregare is located on the left bank of the Iskar River, about 15 km from the confluence with the Danube River. The altitude is 39 m. The land is divided into two parts: hilly, called "Pole" and flat - "Ormanja". To the northwest of the village many sloping slopes rise 40–70 m above it, and to the southeast, above the right bank of the Iskar River, the slopes are steeper and rise higher - up to 80–90 m above the village. The village is built in a relative plain, descending with a slope of 1/400 from southwest to northeast. The climate is temperate continental.

== History ==
The village was settled by Balkan Mountains colonists from Vratsa Province after the Liberation of Bulgaria in 1878. Prior to that, following the Crimean War and more specifically the Siege of Sevastopol (1854–1855), the Ottoman government settled Crimean Tatars and Circassians in the area. They lived in dugouts and adobe houses, but were forced out of the country in 1878. After the Liberation, around 100 families of settlers from Kunino colonized the area; other Bulgarian colonists soon arrived. The colonists included 83 Banat Bulgarian families from Austria-Hungary who arrived in 1894.

The Orthodox church of Archangel Michael was built in 1912–1915 and inaugurated in 1920; according to accounts of elderly people, the architect was from Macedonia. The village also has a small Roman Catholic ("Banatian") church of the Holy Mother of God serving the Banat Bulgarian community. The Father Paisius school's current building was opened in 1934.

== Honour ==
Bregare Point in Antarctica is named after the village.

== Notable people ==
- Georgi Dimitrov Mihailov – member of the 38-th National parliament.

== Gallery ==
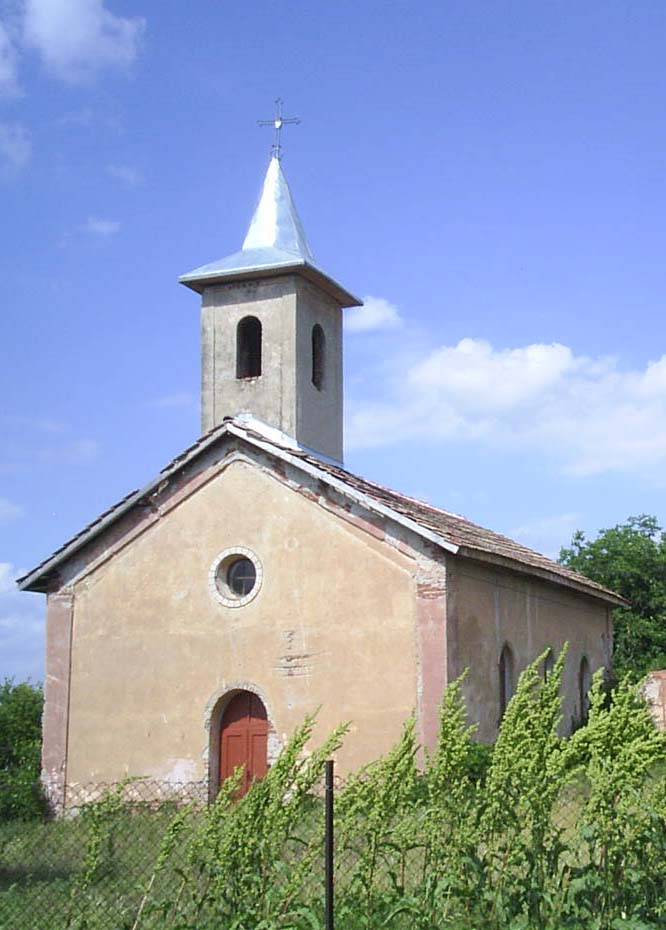
Roman Catholic ("Banatian") church

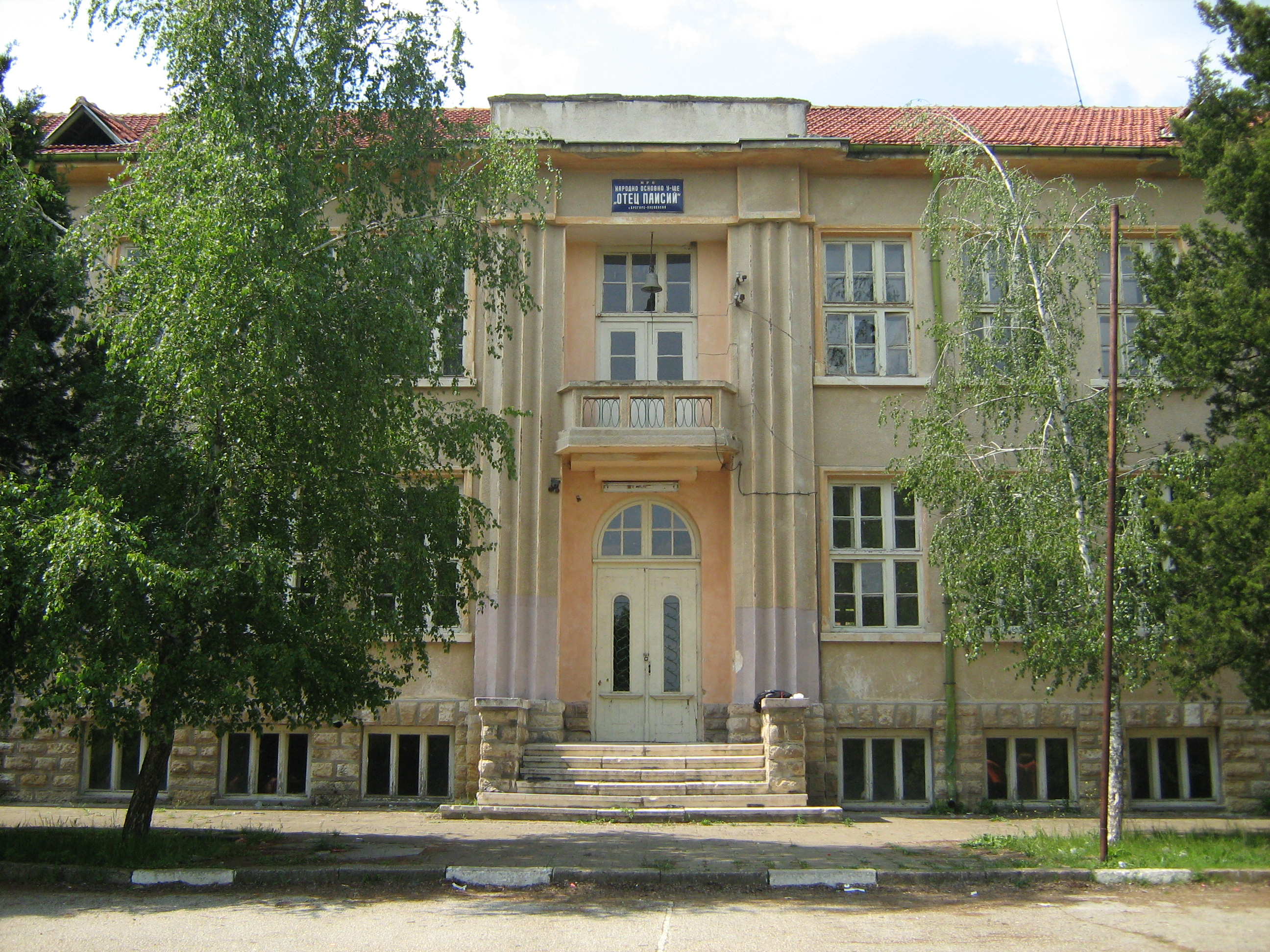
School in Bregare
