= Structure of the Bulgarian Air Force =

The structure of the Bulgarian Air Force is detailed below.

== Air Forces and Air Defence, c.1988 ==
The headquarters of the Air Forces and Air Defence were in Sofia. The Air Force had grown from six FB, twelve fighter-interceptor, and three reconnaissance squadrons circa 1981.

Air Forces and Air Defence Headquarters

- Air Force and Air Defence Headquarters (Щаб на Военновъздушните сили и Противо-въздушната Отбрана (Щаб на ВВС и ПВО)), Sofia (Aviation Square at Tsarigradsko shose, popularly known as the "Fourth Kilometer Area")
  - Electronic Warfare Section (Отделение РЕБ)
    - 89th Independent Electronic Warfare Battalion type "S" (89ти Отделен батальон РЛС тип "С") (Ihtiman Mountain)
  - Central Command Post, in Boyana, Sofia
  - Reserve Command Post, in Bozhurishte
  - Deputy Chief of Staff of the AF and ADF, Chief of the Aerotechnical Engineer Service of the Air Force and Air Defence
    - Scientific Research Base for Exploitation and Repair of Aviation Materiel (Научно-изследователска База за Експлоатация и Ремонт на Авиационна Техника (НИБЕРАТ)) (Vrazhdebna Airfield)
  - Deputy Chief of Staff of the AF and ADF in Charge of Mechanization and Automatization of the Command and Control of the Troops
    - Military Computing Center (Военен Изчислителен Център)
  - Deputy Chief of Staff of the AF and ADF in Charge of Regulation of Air Activities
    - Integrated Joint Air Traffic Control Service (Интегрирана Единна Авиодиспечерска Служба)
  - 16th Transport Air Regiment, Vrazhdebna Airfield (Sofia)
    - 1/16th Transport Air Squadron (unofficially Air Landing - десантна), flying An-24, An-26
    - 2/16th Transport Air Squadron (unofficially Air Transport / Liaison - транспортна / свързочна), flying Let L-410UVP-E, An-30, An-2
    - Special Service Flight, flying 2 Tupolev Tu-134 and 1 Yak-40

When the 10th Mixed Air Corps was formed in 1961 the 16th Transport Air Regiment was part of it, but later it was subordinated directly to the Air Force and Air Defence Forces Headquarters, as the regiment was planned to form Directorate of the Military Transport and Specialised Aviation (Управление на Военнотранспортната и Специалната Авиация (ВТА и СА)) during wartime, when the national airline BGA Balkan would have been mobilized.

The two air defence divisions were coordinated by an Air Defence Command Post in Sofia. The separation line between their areas of responsibility ran along a line from Ruse through Nova Zagora to Svilengrad.

=== 1st Air Defence Division ===
- 1st Air Defence Division, in Bozhurishte, protecting the country's Southwest
  - Dobroslavtsi Airfield (near Sofia)
    - 18th Fighter Air Regiment (18ти Изтребителен Авиационен Полк (18ти ИАП)) (Dobroslavtsi Airfield)
      - 1/18th Fighter Air Squadron, Dobroslavtsi Air Base, flying MiG-23MF/ML/MLA/UB
    - ? Independent Aviation Technical Battalion (? Отделен Авио-технически Батальон (? ОАТБ))
    - 18th Independent Battalion for Signals and Radio- and Lighting Technical Support (18ти Отделен Батальон за Свръзки и Радиосветотехническо Осигуряване (18ти ОБРСТО))
  - Gabrovnitsa Airfield (near Mihaylovgrad, present day Montana)
    - 18th Fighter Air Regiment (18ти Изтребителен Авиационен Полк (18ти ИАП)) (Dobroslavtsi Airfield)
      - 2/18th Fighter Air Squadron, Gabrovnitsa Air Base, flying MiG-23MLD/UB
    - ? Independent Aviation Technical Battalion (? Отделен Авио-технически Батальон (? ОАТБ))
    - 11th Independent Battalion for Signals and Radio- and Lighting Technical Support (11ти Отделен Батальон за Свръзки и Радиосветотехническо Осигуряване (11ти ОБРСТО))
  - 1st Anti-Aircraft Missile Brigade, Bozhurishte, protecting Sofia and Western Bulgaria
    - Brigade Command and Staff (Bozhurishte)
    - Group of Divisions S-200 (Група дивизиони С-200) (Kostinbrod - Ponor village) - S-200 "Vega" SAM
      - 1st Fire Division S-200 (1ви огневи дивизион С-200 (одн С-200))
      - 2nd Fire Division S-200 (2ри огневи дивизион С-200 (одн С-200))
      - Technical Division (технически дивизион (тдн))
    - Missile Air Defence Division (зенитно-ракетен дивизион (зрдн)) (Bankya suburb of Sofia) - S-300PMU SAM
    - Missile Air Defence Division (зенитно-ракетен дивизион (зрдн)) (Samokov) - S-75M "Volhov" SAM
    - Missile Air Defence Division (зенитно-ракетен дивизион (зрдн)) (Yarlovo village near Samokov) - S-75M "Volhov" SAM
    - Missile Air Defence Division (зенитно-ракетен дивизион (зрдн)) (Ihtiman) - S-75M "Volhov" SAM
    - Missile Air Defence Division (зенитно-ракетен дивизион (зрдн)) (Baykal village near Pernik) - S-75M "Volhov" SAM
    - Missile Air Defence Division (зенитно-ракетен дивизион (зрдн)) (Stanke Dimitrov, present day Dupnitsa) - S-125 "Neva" SAM
    - Missile Air Defence Division (зенитно-ракетен дивизион (зрдн)) (Lyulin mountain) - S-125 "Neva" SAM
    - Missile Air Defence Division (зенитно-ракетен дивизион (зрдн)) (Bozhurishte) - S-125 "Neva" SAM
    - Missile Air Defence Division (зенитно-ракетен дивизион (зрдн)) (Musachevo village near Sofia) - S-125 "Neva" SAM
    - Technical Division (технически дивизион (тдн)) (Yana Railway Station village)
    - Technical Division (технически дивизион (тдн)) (Radomir)
  - 2nd Anti-Aircraft Missile Brigade, in Plovdiv, protecting central Bulgaria
    - Brigade Command and Staff (Plovdiv)
    - Missile Air Defence Division (зенитно-ракетен дивизион (зрдн)) (Dimitrovgrad) - S-75M "Volhov" SAM
    - Missile Air Defence Division (зенитно-ракетен дивизион (зрдн)) (Byala Cherkva village) - S-75M "Volhov" SAM
    - Missile Air Defence Division (зенитно-ракетен дивизион (зрдн)) (Trilistnik village) - S-75M "Volhov" SAM
    - Missile Air Defence Division (зенитно-ракетен дивизион (зрдн)) (Haskovo) - SA-75 "Dvina" SAM, converted to S-75M "Volhov" SAM in 1990.
    - Missile Air Defence Division (зенитно-ракетен дивизион (зрдн)) (Yagodovo village) - S-125 "Neva" SAM
    - Missile Air Defence Division (зенитно-ракетен дивизион (зрдн)) (Tsaratsovo village) - S-125 "Neva" SAM
    - Technical Division (технически дивизион (тдн)) (Mavrudovo village, near Krumovo airfield)
  - 1st Radio-technical Brigade, in Bozhurishte

=== 2nd Air Defence Division ===
- 2nd Air Defence Division, in Yambol, protecting the country's Southeast
  - Ravnets Airfield (near Burgas)
    - 17th Fighter Air Regiment (18ти Изтребителен Авиационен Полк (18ти ИАП)) (Ravnets Airfield)
      - 1/17th Fighter Air Squadron, flying MiG-29/UB
    - 53rd Independent Aviation Technical Battalion (53ти Отделен Авио-технически Батальон (53ти ОАТБ))
    - 15th Independent Battalion for Signals and Radio- and Lighting Technical Support (15ти Отделен Батальон за Свръзки и Радиосветотехническо Осигуряване (15ти ОБРСТО))
  - Balchik Airfield (Balchik)
    - 17th Fighter Air Regiment (18ти Изтребителен Авиационен Полк (18ти ИАП)) (Ravnets Airfield)
      - 2/17th Fighter Air Squadron, flying MiG-21PFM/US
    - 45th Independent Aviation Technical Battalion (45ти Отделен Авио-технически Батальон (45ти ОАТБ))
    - 27th Independent Battalion for Signals and Radio- and Lighting Technical Support (27ми Отделен Батальон за Свръзки и Радиосветотехническо Осигуряване (27ми ОБРСТО))
  - 3rd Anti-Aircraft Missile Brigade (3та Зенитно-ракетна Бригада (3та зрбр)), in Burgas, protecting the oil refinery in Burgas, the naval bases in Varna and Burgas, and Eastern Bulgaria
    - Brigade Command and Staff (Burgas)
    - unofficially the Burgas groupment
      - Missile Air Defence Division (зенитно-ракетен дивизион (зрдн)) (Debelt) - S-75M "Volkhov" SAM
      - Missile Air Defence Division (зенитно-ракетен дивизион (зрдн)) (Pchela village, near Elhovo) - SA-75 "Dvina" SAM
      - Missile Air Defence Division (зенитно-ракетен дивизион (зрдн)) (Chernomorec village, near Sozopol) - SA-75 "Dvina" SAM
      - Missile Air Defence Division (зенитно-ракетен дивизион (зрдн)) (Pomorie) - S-125 "Neva" SAM
      - Technical Division (технически дивизион (тдн)) (Rusokastro village, near Burgas)
    - unofficially the Varna groupment
      - Missile Air Defence Division (зенитно-ракетен дивизион (зрдн)) (Vladislavovo, Varna) - SA-75 "Dvina" SAM
      - Missile Air Defence Division (зенитно-ракетен дивизион (зрдн)) (Kamchia village) - SA-75 "Dvina" SAM
      - Missile Air Defence Division (зенитно-ракетен дивизион (зрдн)) (Oborishte village) - SA-75 "Dvina" SAM
      - Missile Air Defence Division (зенитно-ракетен дивизион (зрдн)) (Galata village) - S-125 "Neva" SAM
      - Technical Division (технически дивизион (тдн)) (Lyuben Karavelovo village, near Varna)
  - 10th Radio-technical Regiment, in Yambol

=== 10th Composite Aviation Corps ===
- Headquarters (Щаб на 10ти Смесен Авиационен Корпус (Щаб 10ти САК)), Plovdiv airfield
- Command Post, Plovdiv airfield
- Kolyu Ganchevo Air Base (Stara Zagora)
  - 13th Helicopter Air Regiment of Combat Helicopters (13ти Вертолетен Авиационен Полк - Бойни Вертолети (13ти ВАП - БВ))
    - 1/13th Attack Helicopter Air Squadron, flying Mi-24D
    - 2/13th Attack Helicopter Air Squadron, flying Mi-24D/V
  - 42nd Independent Aviation Technical Battalion (42ри Отделен Авио-технически Батальон (42ри ОАТБ))
  - 21st Independent Battalion for Signals and Radio- and Lighting Technical Support (21ви Отделен Батальон за Свръзки и Радиосветотехническо Осигуряване (21ви ОБРСТО))
- Graf Ignatievo Airfield (near Plovdiv)
  - 19th Fighter Air Regiment (19ти Изтребителен Авиационен Полк (19ти ИАП))
    - 1/19th Fighter Air Squadron, flying MiG-21bis/UM
    - 2/19th Fighter Air Squadron, flying MiG-21bis/UM
  - 39th Independent Aviation Technical Battalion (39ти Отделен Авио-технически Батальон (39ти ОАТБ))
  - 19th Independent Battalion for Signals and Radio- and Lighting Technical Support (19ти Отделен Батальон за Свръзки и Радиосветотехническо Осигуряване (19ти ОБРСТО))
- Uzundzhovo Airfield (near Haskovo)
  - 21st Fighter Air Regiment (21ви Изтребителен Авиационен Полк (21ви ИАП))
    - 1/21st Fighter Air Squadron, flying MiG-21MF/UM
    - 2/21st Fighter Air Squadron, flying MiG-21MF/UM
  - 81st Independent Aviation Technical Battalion (39ти Отделен Авио-технически Батальон (39ти ОАТБ))
  - 21st Independent Battalion for Signals and Radio- and Lighting Technical Support (21ви Отделен Батальон за Свръзки и Радиосветотехническо Осигуряване (21ви ОБРСТО))
- Bezmer Airfield (near Yambol)
- 22nd Fighter-Bomber Air Regiment (22ри Изтребително-бомбардировъчен Авиационен Полк (22ри ИБАП))
  - 1/22nd Fighter-Bomber Air Squadron, flying Su-25K/UBK
  - 2/22nd Fighter-Bomber Air Squadron, flying Su-25K/UBK
- ? Independent Aviation Technical Battalion (? Отделен Авио-технически Батальон (? ОАТБ))
- 22nd Independent Battalion for Signals and Radio- and Lighting Technical Support (22ри Отделен Батальон за Свръзки и Радиосветотехническо Осигуряване (22ри ОБРСТО))
- Cheshnegirovo (Sadovo) Airfield (near Plovdiv)
  - 25th Fighter-Bomber Air Regiment (25ти Изтребително-бомбардировъчен Авиационен Полк (25ти ИБАП))
    - 1/25th Fighter-Bomber Air Squadron, flying MiG-23BN/UB
    - 2/25th Fighter-Bomber Air Squadron, flying MiG-23BN/UB
  - ? Independent Aviation Technical Battalion (? Отделен Авио-технически Батальон (? ОАТБ))
  - 25th Independent Battalion for Signals and Radio- and Lighting Technical Support (25ти Отделен Батальон за Свръзки и Радиосветотехническо Осигуряване (25ти ОБРСТО))
- Tolbukhin Airfield (present day Dobrich)
  - 26th Reconnaissance Air Regiment (26ти Разузнавателен Авиационен Полк (26ти РАП))
    - 1/26th Reconnaissance Air Squadron, flying MiG-21R/F-13 (R)/US
    - 2/26th Reconnaissance Air Squadron, flying Su-22M4, Su-22UM3K
    - Independent Air Flight for Operational Reconnaissance, flying MiG-25RBT, MiG-25RU
  - 30th Independent Aviation Technical Battalion (30ти Отделен Авио-технически Батальон (30ти ОАТБ))
  - 26th Independent Battalion for Signals and Radio- and Lighting Technical Support (26ти Отделен Батальон за Свръзки и Радиосветотехническо Осигуряване (26ти ОБРСТО))
- Krumovo Airfield (Plovdiv IAP)
  - 44th Helicopter Air Regiment (44ти Вертолетен Авиационен Полк (44ти ВАП))
    - 1/44th Helicopter Air Squadron, flying Mi-8T
    - 2/44th Helicopter Air Squadron, flying Mi-17
    - 3/44th Helicopter (Training) Air Squadron, flying Mi-2
  - ? Independent Aviation Technical Battalion (? Отделен Авио-технически Батальон (? ОАТБ))
  - 44th Independent Battalion for Signals and Radio- and Lighting Technical Support (44ти Отделен Батальон за Свръзки и Радиосветотехническо Осигуряване (44ти ОБРСТО))
- Troops Aviation Repair Workshop Graf Ignatievo (Войскова Авиационна Ремонтна Работилница - Граф Игнатиево (ВАРР))
- Troops Aviation Repair Workshop Bezmer (Войскова Авиационна Ремонтна Работилница - Безмер (ВАРР))
- Troops Aviation Missile Repair Workshop (Войскова Авиационна Ремонтна Работилница за Ракети (ВАРРР)) (Graf Ignatievo)
- 10th Signals Regiment (10ти Свързочен Полк), in Plovdiv
- 10th Radio-Technical Battalion, in Plovdiv (supporting the flight activities of the corps' air regiments, with radar posts located at the airfields)

=== People's Higher Air Force School ===
The modern Bulgarian Air Force Training originates from 1955, when by order #182/ 1955 (July 6, 1955) the commander of the People's Higher Air Force School transferred the 1st Combat Training Air Squadron (1ва Учебно-Бойна Авиационна Ескадрила (1. УБАЕ)) with its Yak-11 trainers from Telish Air Base to Kamenets Air Base and transformed it into 2nd Combat Training Air Regiment (2ри Учебно-Боен Авиационен Полк (2. УБАП)) with its 2 Yak-11 squadrons transitioning to Yak-17 and Yak-23. In the following year the air regiment transitioned to MiG-15/MiG-15bis/UMiG-15, and then to MiG-17s in 1963.

In 1967 the 2nd Combat Training Air Regiment split in two separate combat-training air regiments. The 1st Combat Training Air Regiment relocated to Shtraklevo Air Base close to Ruse with two MiG-17 squadrons and a third squadron relocated to Dolna Mitropoliya. The remainder of 2nd Combat Training Air Regiment stayed in Kamenets with two MiG-17 squadrons, retaining its designations. In 1969 the 1st Combat Training Air Regiment (1 CATR) formed a fourth MiG-17 squadron at Dolna Mitropoliya (1st and 2nd at Straklevo, 3rd and 4th at Dolna Mitropoliya AB). In 1971 the 3rd and 4th Squadrons split from the 1st CTAR, becoming 1st and 2nd Squadrons of a newly formed 3rd Combat Training Air Regiment at Dolna Mitropoliya. The replacement of the MiG-17 with Aero L-29 Delfín jet trainers started in 1964 at 2nd CTAR at Kamenets with small numbers used for the training of flight instructors. In 1965 the training of air force cadets on the L-29 started from the 3rd Squadron of 1st CTAR at Dolna Mitropoliya, and continued with the progress in deliveries with the 1st and 2nd Squadrons in Shtraklevo and the newly formed 4th Squadron in Dolna Mitropoliya.

The 2nd CTAR converted its 1st Squadron to MiG-21 in 1984 and its 2nd Squadron to L-39 in 1986.

- People's Higher Air Force School "Georgi Benkovski" (Висше Народно Военновъздушно Училище "Георги Бенковски" (ВНВВУ)) (Dolna Mitropoliya Air Base)
  - Shtraklevo Airfield (near Ruse)
    - 1st Combat Training Air Regiment (1ви Учебно-боен Авиационен Полк (1ви УБАП))
      - 1/1st Training Air Squadron, flying L-29 Delfín
      - 2/1st Training Air Squadron, flying L-29 Delfín
      - 3/1st Training Air Squadron, flying L-29 Delfín
    - 34th Independent Aviation Technical Battalion (34ти Отделен Авио-технически Батальон (34ти ОАТБ))
    - 12th Independent Battalion for Signals and Radio- and Lighting Technical Support (12ти Отделен Батальон за Свръзки и Радиосветотехническо Осигуряване (12ти ОБРСТО))
  - Kamenets Airfield (near Pleven)
    - 2nd Combat Training Air Regiment (2ри Учебно-боен Авиационен Полк (2ри УБАП))
      - 1/2nd Training Air Squadron, flying MiG-21PFM/UM
      - 2/2nd Training Air Squadron, flying [[Aero L-39 Albatros|L-39ZA Albatros]]
    - ? Independent Aviation Technical Battalion (? Отделен Авио-технически Батальон (? ОАТБ))
    - ? Independent Battalion for Signals and Radio- and Lighting Technical Support (? Отделен Батальон за Свръзки и Радиосветотехническо Осигуряване (? ОБРСТО))
  - Dolna Mitropoliya Airfield (near Pleven)
    - 3rd Independent Training Air Squadron (3та Отделна Учебна Авиационна Ескадрила (3та ОУАЕ)), flying L-29 Delfín
    - 49th Independent Aviation Technical Battalion (49ти Отделен Авио-технически Батальон (49ти ОАТБ))
    - 4th Independent Battalion for Signals and Radio- and Lighting Technical Support (4ти Отделен Батальон за Свръзки и Радиосветотехническо Осигуряване (4ти ОБРСТО))
  - Troops Aviation Repair Workshop Dolna Mitropoliya (Войскова Авиационна Ремонтна Работилница - Долна Митрополия (ВАРР))

=== Air Force and Air Defence Forces Equipment ===
In 1989 the air force's inventory consisted of:

- 51x MiG-21PFM interceptors, 35x MiG-21MF and 36x MiG-21bis fighters, 33x MiG-21UM two-seat trainers, 6x MiG-21R and 11 obsolete MiG-21F-13(R) reconnaissance aircraft
- 18x Su-22M4, 3x Su-22UM3K
- 7x MiG-23MF, 11x MiG-23ML/MLA and 15x MiG-23MLD fighters, 33x MiG-23BN attack aircraft, 15x MiG-23UB two-seat trainers (8x MiG-23s lost in accidents until 1989)
- 2x MiG-25RBT ELINT-reconnaissance aircraft, 1x MiG-25RU two-seat trainer (single seaters nr. 731 and 754 (a third single-seater nr. 736 lost in 1984), twin seater nr. 51, the three remaining aircraft exchanged with the Soviet Union in 1990 for 5 second hand Mikoyan-Gurevich MiG-23MLD)
- 32x Su-25K attack aircraft, 3x Su-25UBK two-seat trainers
- 12x MiG-29A fighters, 4x MiG-29UB two-seat trainers
- 38x Mi-24D and 6x Mi-24V attack helicopters
- 20x Mi-17 transport helicopters (of them 4 PP variant for EW)
- around 84 L-29 Delfín two-seat trainers
- at 18x L-39ZA Albatros two-seat trainers (another 18 delivered in 1990)
- a further 36x MiG-21bis fighters were delivered in 1990 from Soviet Air Force stocks, 18 each for the conversion of the fighter squadrons in Balchik and Uzundzhovo.
- 14x Mi-2 and 7x Mi-8 helicopters
- 3x An-2, 3x An-24, 5x An-26, 1x An-30, 1x Yak-40, 2x Tu-134, 5x Let L-410UVP-E (of them 1 in photo variant) passenger and transport planes.

The three anti-aircraft missile brigades were equipped with the following air defence systems:

- 20x S-75M Volkhov high-altitude air defence systems
- 30x S-125 Pechora mobile air defence systems
- 25x S-200 Vega long range air defence systems
- 10x S-300 air defence systems

== Structure c. 2019 ==
Bulgarian Air Force locations 2018:
MiG-29A/UB Su-25K/UBK Helicopters other flying units
Command and Control centres Air defence missile units other sites

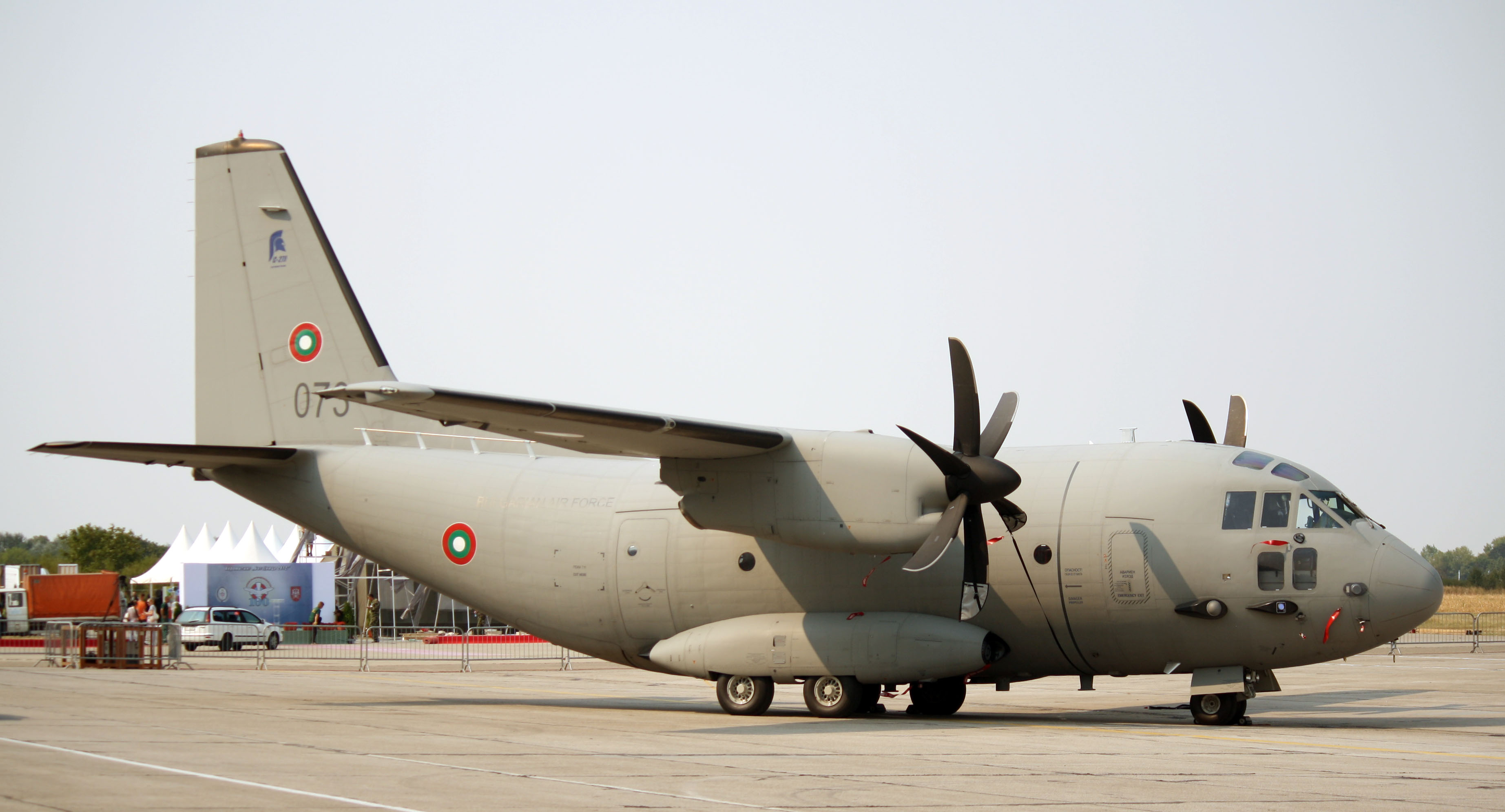
C-27J Spartan Bulgarian Air Force

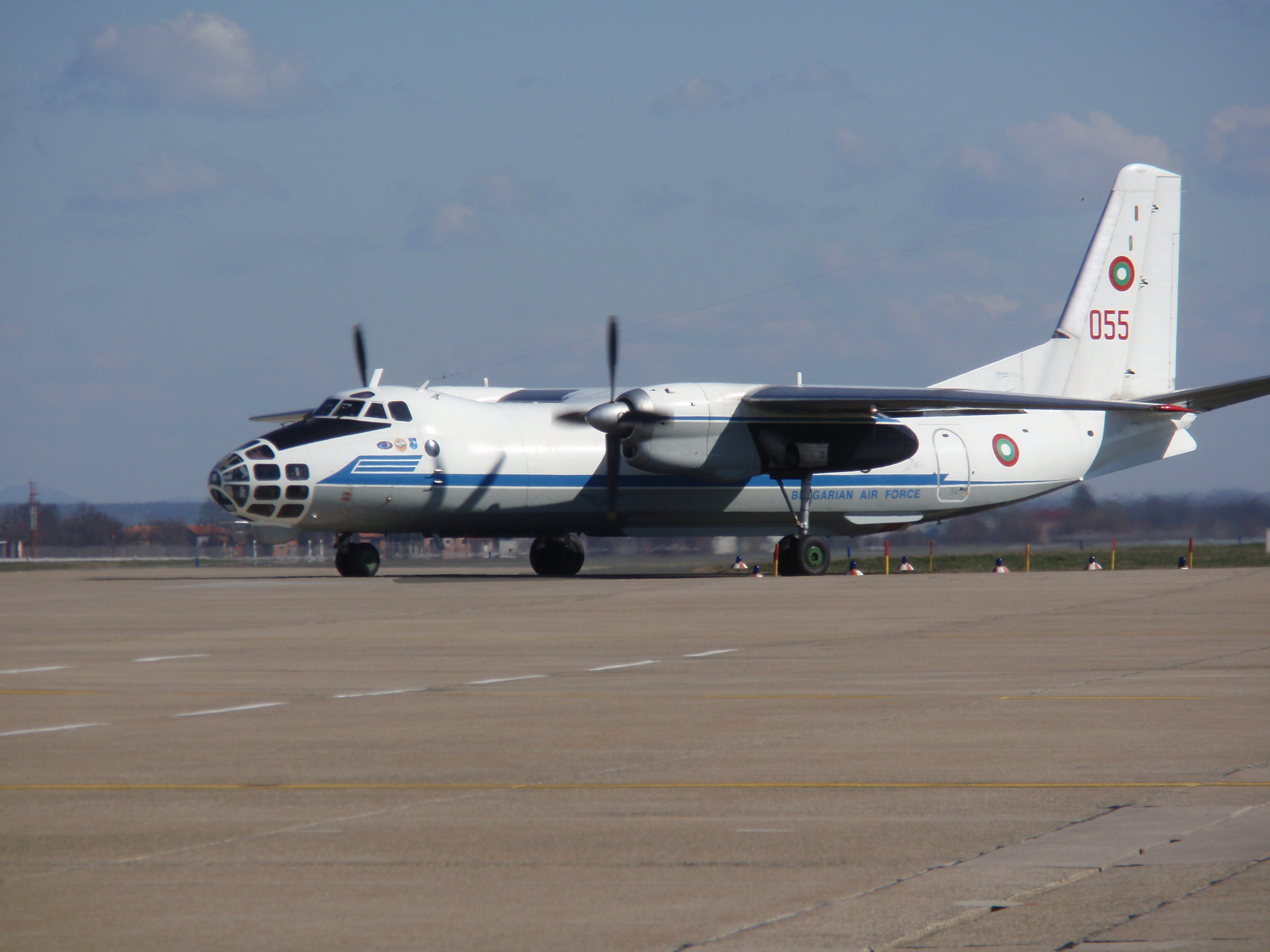
An-30 Bulgarian Air Force

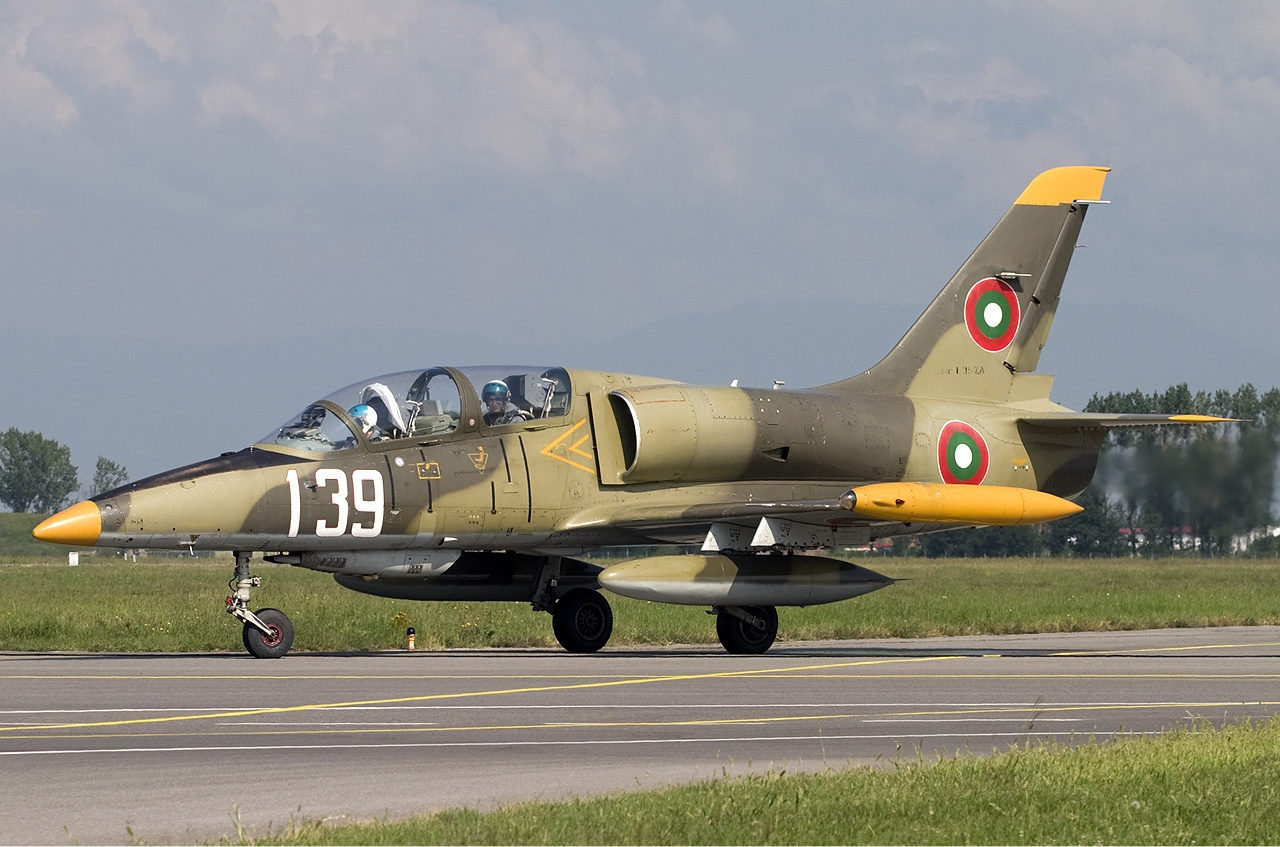
Aero L-39ZA Albatros

- Joint Forces Command, Sofia
  - Military Command Center, Sofia
    - Air Sovereignty Operations Center, Sofia, reports to NATO's Integrated Air Defense System CAOC Torrejón in Spain
  - Air Forces Command, Sofia
    - Command, Control and Surveillance Base (III)
      - Headquarters
      - 1st Control and Surveillance Zone, Bozhurishte, Sofia Province
      - 2nd Control and Surveillance Zone, Trud, Plovdiv Province
      - 3rd Control and Surveillance Zone, Bratovo, Burgas Province
      - CIS and Navigation Systems Squadron, Graf Ignatievo Air Base
      - CIS and Navigation Systems Squadron, Krumovo Air Base
      - CIS and Navigation Systems Squadron, Dolna Mitropoliya Air Base
      - Air Force Meteorological Center
      - Aviation Technical Base, Balchik Airfield (reserve airfield, former 6th Fighter Air Base)
    - 3rd Air Base, Graf Ignatievo Air Base (X)
      - Headquarters and Headquarters Services
      - 1st Fighter Squadron, operating 12x MiG-29A, 3x MiG-29UB
      - Aircraft Operational Support Ground Squadron
      - Maintenance and Aircraft Repair Squadron
      - Maintenance and Missile Repair Squadron
      - Airfield Technical Support and Supply Squadron
    - 24th Air Base, Krumovo Air Base (X)
      - Headquarters and Headquarters Services
      - 16th Air Transport Group, Vrazhdebna Air Base, operating 3x C-27J, 1x Pilatus PC-12, 2x Let L-410 Turbolet, 1x An-30, 2x An-26, 1x An-2
      - Attack Helicopter Squadron, operating 6x Mi-24
      - 2nd Transport Helicopter Squadron, operating 8x Eurocopter Cougar TTH, 4x Eurocopter Cougar CSAR, 3x Mi-17
      - Helicopter Training Flight, operating 6x Bell 206
      - (Combat) Search and Rescue Flight, a company of infantrymen and medics
      - Aircraft Operational Support Ground Squadron
      - Maintenance and Aircraft Repair Squadron
      - Airfield Technical Support and Supply Squadron
    - Forward Deployment Air Base Bezmer (III)
      - Headquarters and Headquarters Services
      - 1st Ground Attack Squadron, operating 10x Su-25K, 4x Su-25UBK
      - Aircraft Operational Support Ground Squadron
      - Maintenance and Aircraft Repair Squadron
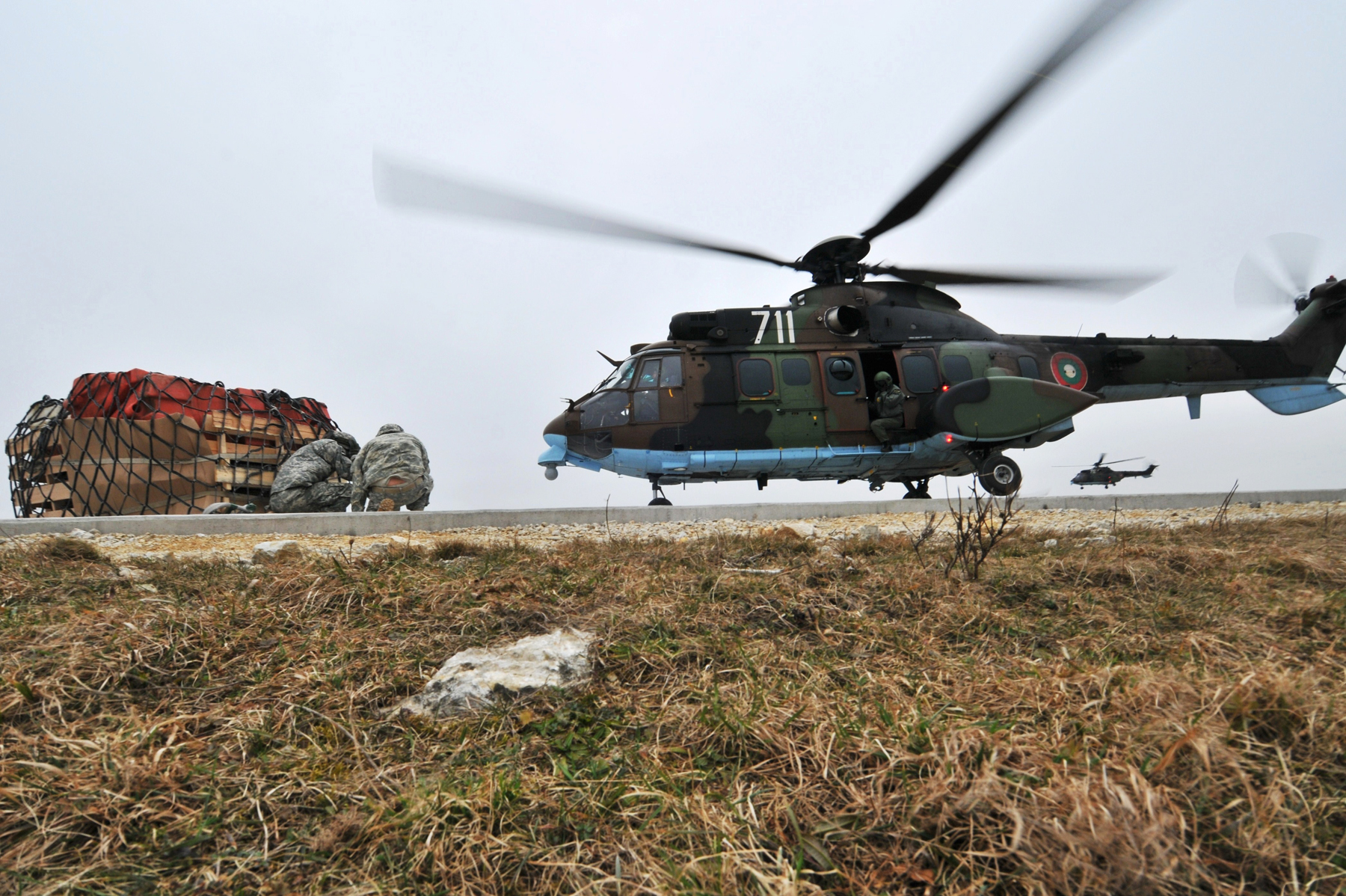
        Bulgarian Eurocopter Cougar
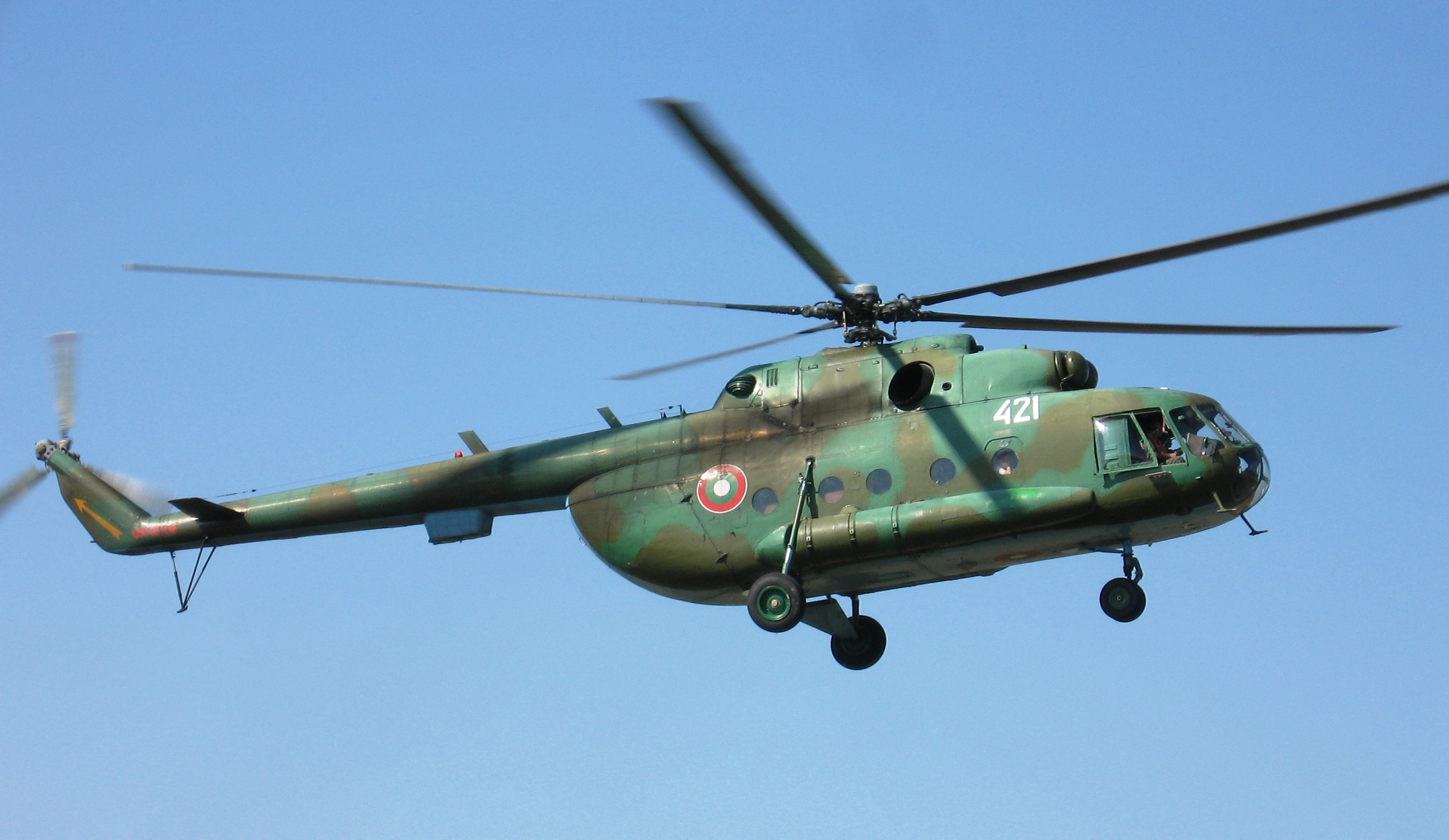
        Bulgarian Mi-17
      - Airfield Technical Support and Supply Squadron
    - Training Base "Georgi Benkovski", at Dolna Mitropoliya Air Base (III)
      - operating 6x Pilatus PC-9 and 6x Aero L-39 Albatros
        (detached from the 3rd Air Base into a separate air base on 1 July 2017)
    - Missile Air Defence Base, Sofia (III)
      - Headquarters
      - Missile Air Defence Battalion (S-300P), Bankya
      - Missile Air Defence Battalion (S-200), Kostinbrod
      - Missile Air Defence Battalion (S125 Neva), Kichevo
      - Missile Air Defence Battalion (S125 Neva), Chernomorets
      - Mobile Missile Air Defence Battalion (2K12 Kub), Stara Zagora
      - Missile Air Defence Shooting Range, Shabla
    - Special Equipment Base (III), Bozhurishte suburb, Sofia
    - Military Police Company of the Air Forces Command
    - Air Forces Command Documentation Support Center
