= Starmen Point =

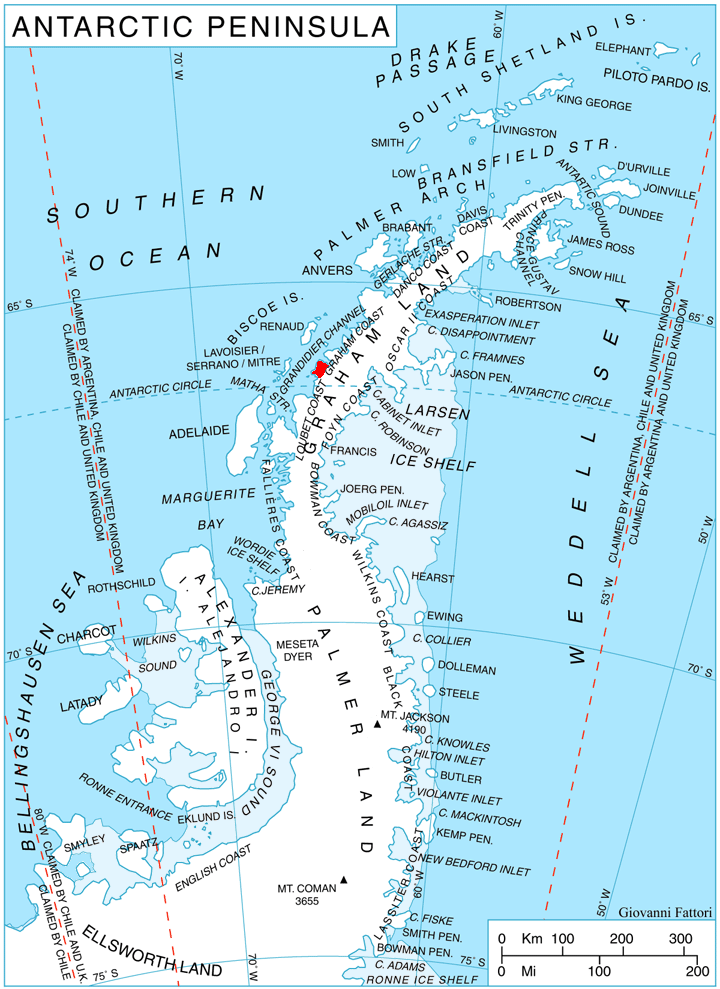
Location of Stresher Peninsula on Graham Land, Antarctic Peninsula.

Starmen Point (Bulgarian: нос Стърмен, ‘Nos Starmen’ \'nos 'st&r-men\) is the point on the west side of the entrance to Crates Bay on the northeast coast of Stresher Peninsula, Graham Coast on the Antarctic Peninsula.

The feature is named after the settlement of Starmen in Northeastern Bulgaria.

== Location ==
Starmen Point is located at 66°07′29″S 65°28′22″W, which is 7.23 km east-southeast of Black Head, 14.3 km south-southwest of Prospect Point and 4.9 km west-northwest of the headland formed by Lens Peak. British mapping in 1976.

== Maps ==
- British Antarctic Territory. Scale 1:200000 topographic map. DOS 610 Series, Sheet W 66 64. Directorate of Overseas Surveys, Tolworth, UK, 1976.
- Antarctic Digital Database (ADD). Scale 1:250000 topographic map of Antarctica. Scientific Committee on Antarctic Research (SCAR). Since 1993, regularly upgraded and updated.
