= Dolna Mitropoliya Air Base =

Airport in Bulgaria

- Авиобаза Долна Митрополия
- Dolna Mitropoliya, Bulgaria
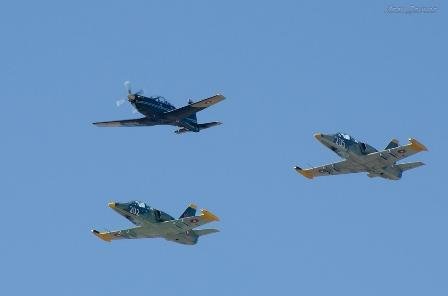
- PC-9 and L-39 Albatros from the Bulgarian Air Force

Site information
- Type: Military Air Base
- Operator: Bulgarian Air Force
- Controlled by: Bulgarian Air Force

Location
- Location within Bulgaria
- Coordinates: 43°27′06″N 24°30′10″E

Airfield information
- Identifiers: ICAO: LBPL
- Elevation: 101 metres (331 ft) AMSL
Runways
Direction	Length and surface
10/28	2,192 metres (7,192 ft) Concrete
10R/28L	2,387 metres (7,831 ft) Grass
- Source: Landings.com

Dolna Mitropoliya Air Base (Bulgarian: Летище Долна Митрополия, ICAO: LBPL) is a public use airport near Dolna Mitropoliya, Pleven, Bulgaria. It is the home of the aviation faculty of the National Defence University. The 12th Air Training Wing is stationed there. The aviation school was created in 1945 and named after Georgi Benkovski. The school moved to Dolna Mitropoliya in 1948 and was incorporated in 2002 as part of the National Defence University.

== See also ==
- List of airports in Bulgaria
