= Conway Island =

Island in Graham Land, Antarctica

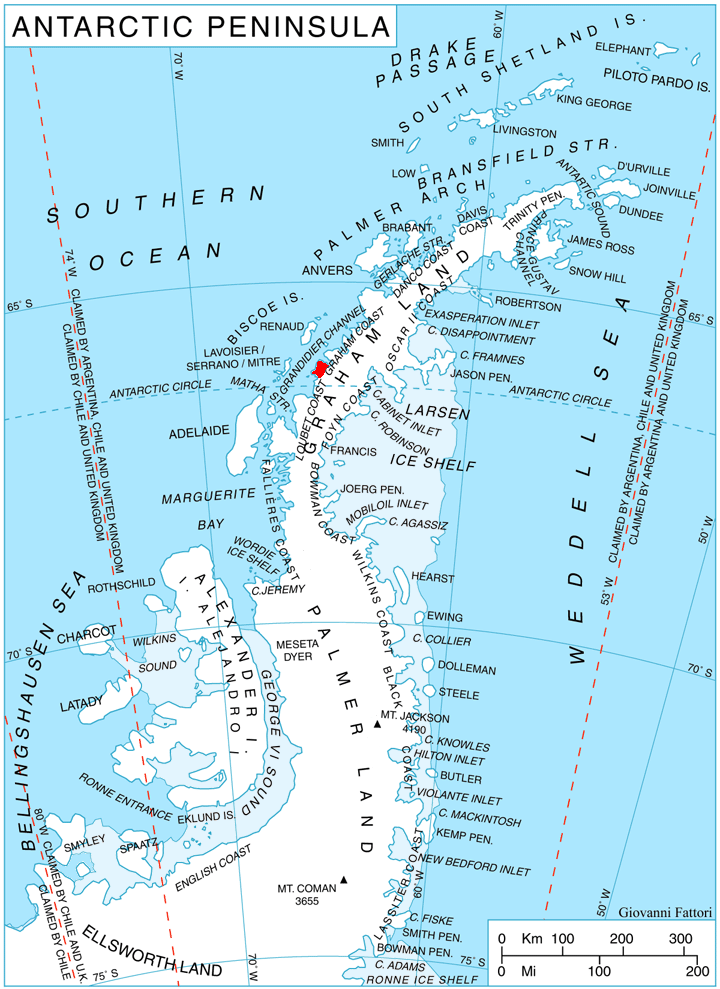
Location of Stresher Peninsula on Graham Land, Antarctic Peninsula.

Conway Island (66°8′S 65°28′W) lies in Crates Bay to the west of Lens Peak and facing Bregare Point, off the northeast coast of Stresher Peninsula, Graham Land. It was photographed by Hunting Aerosurveys Ltd in 1956–57, and mapped from these photos by the Falkland Islands Dependencies Survey. It was named by the UK Antarctic Place-Names Committee in 1959 for Martin Conway, 1st Baron Conway of Allington, an English mountaineer and a pioneer of polar skiing during his crossing of Vestspitsbergen in 1896.

== See also ==
- List of Antarctic and sub-Antarctic islands
