= Dolna Mitropoliya Municipality =

Dolna Mitropoliya Municipality Община Долна Митрополия
- Municipality
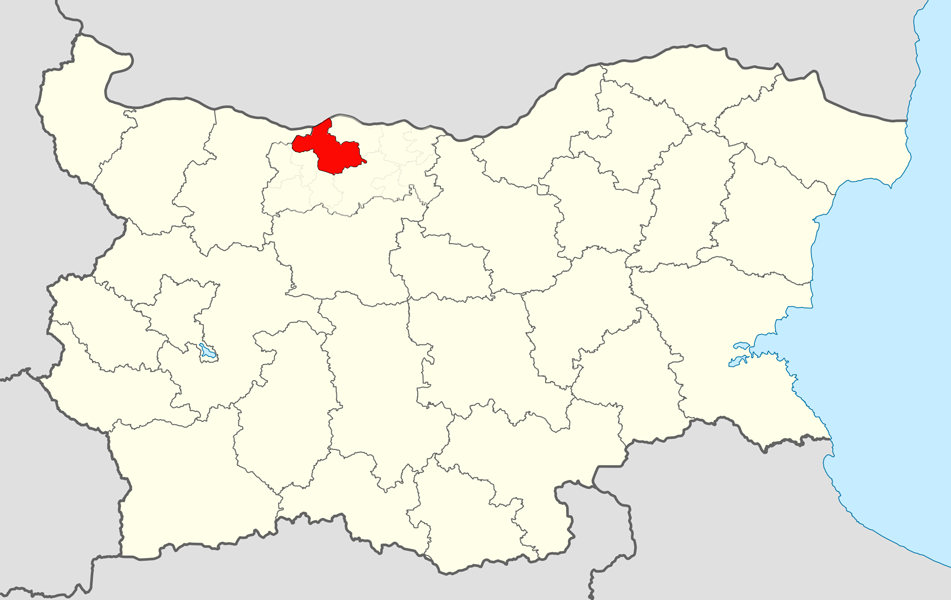
- Dolna Mitropoliya Municipality within Bulgaria and Pleven Province.
- Coordinates: 43°33′N 24°30′E
- Country: Bulgaria
- Province (Oblast): Pleven
- Admin. centre (Obshtinski tsentar): Dolna Mitropoliya

Area
  - Total: 674.81 km^{2} (260.55 sq mi)

Population (December 2009)
  - Total: 21,304
  - Density: 31.570/km^{2} (81.767/sq mi)
- Time zone: UTC+2 (EET)
  - Summer (DST): UTC+3 (EEST)

Dolna Mitropoliya Municipality (Bulgarian: Община Долна Митрополия) is a municipality (obshtina) in Pleven Province, Northern Bulgaria. It embraces a territory of 674.81 km^{2} (260.55 sq mi) with a population, as of December 2009, of 21,304 inhabitants. The administrative centre of the area is the homonymous town of Dolna Mitropoliya.

The northern boundary of the municipality is the Danube River, and the 10,926 hectare Natura 2000 Reka Vit Special Protection Area for preservation of avian habitat is located there.

== Settlements ==
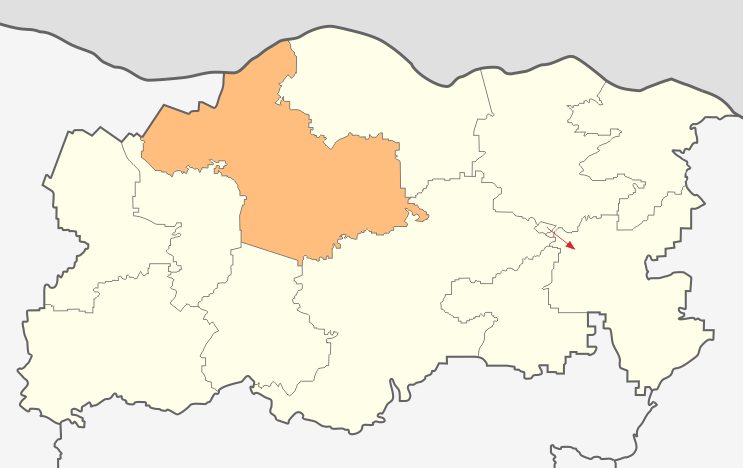
Dolna Mitropoliya Municipality within Pleven Province

(towns are shown in bold):

Town/Village	Cyrillic	Population (December 2009)
**Dolna Mitropoliya**	**Долна Митрополия**	3,303
Baykal	Байкал	562
Bivolare	Биволаре	627
Bozhuritsa	Божурица	1,102
Bregare	Брегаре	637
Gorna Mitropoliya	Горна Митрополия	1,827
Gostilya	Гостиля	279
Komarevo	Комарево	1,224
Krushovene	Крушовене	1,054
Orehovitsa	Ореховица	1,440
Pobeda	Победа	517
Podem	Подем	1,023
Riben	Рибен	769
Slavovitsa	Славовица	573
Stavertsi	Ставерци	1,848
**Trastenik**	**Тръстеник**	4,519
Total		21,304

== Demography ==
The following table shows the change of the population during the last four decades. Since 1992 Dolna Mitropoliya Municipality has comprised the former municipality of Podem and the numbers in the table reflect this unification.

Dolna Mitropoliya Municipality
**Year**	1975	1985	1992	**2001**	2005	2007	2009	**2011**
**Population**	28,405	24,079	29,087	25,311	22,994	22,237	21,304	...
Sources: Census 2001, Census 2011, „pop-stat.mashke.org“,

=== Religion ===
According to the latest Bulgarian census of 2011, the religious composition, among those who answered the optional question on religious identification, was the following:

Religious composition of Dolna Mitropoliya Municipality
Orthodox Christianity	83.9%
Catholicism	0.8%
Protestantism	0.6%
Islam	2.5%
No religion	5.4%
Prefer not to answer, others and indefinable	6.8%

== See also ==
- Provinces of Bulgaria
- Municipalities of Bulgaria
- List of cities and towns in Bulgaria
