= Crates Bay =

Bay in Antarctica

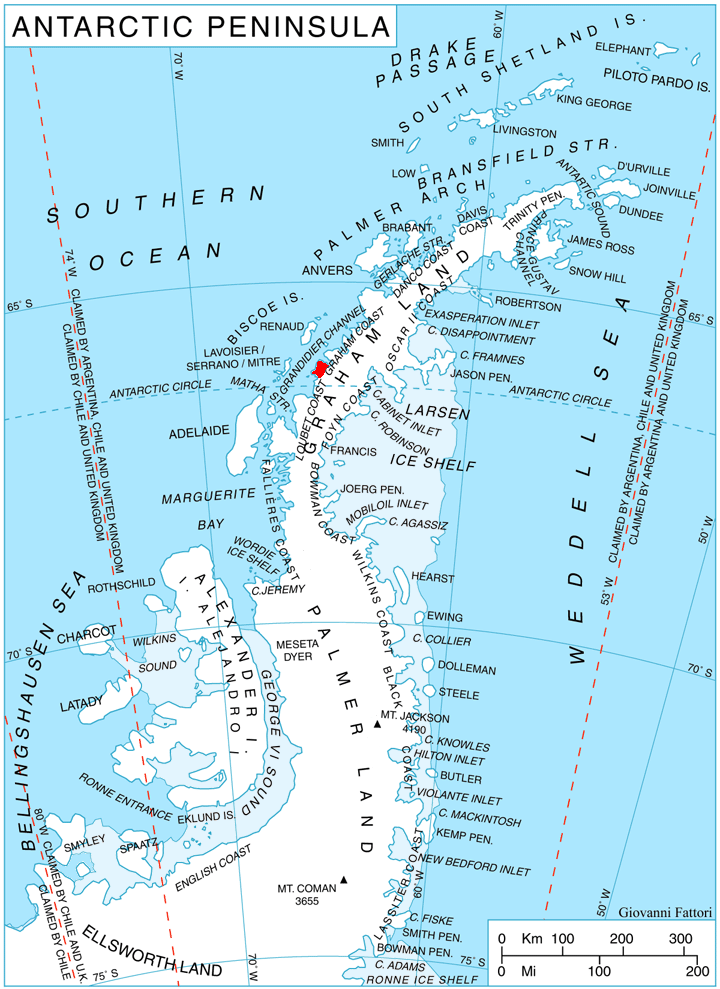
Location of Stresher Peninsula on Graham Land, Antarctic Peninsula.

Crates Bay (Bulgarian: залив Кратес, ‘Zaliv Krates’ \'za-liv 'kra-tes\) is the 8 km wide bay indenting for 6 km the northeast coast of Stresher Peninsula, Graham Coast on the Antarctic Peninsula. It is part of Holtedahl Bay, entered southeast of Starmen Point and northwest of the headland formed by Lens Peak. Conway Island lies in the central part of the bay. Crates Bay was formed as a result of glacier retreat during the last three decades of the 20th century.

The feature is named after the Greek philosopher Crates of Mallus (2nd century BC) who placed the southern polar land envisaged by Aristotle as two areas on the earliest globe representing the Earth.

== Location ==
Crates Bay is centred at 66°09′20″S 65°25′30″W. British mapping in 1976.

== Maps ==
- British Antarctic Territory. Scale 1:200000 topographic map. DOS 610 Series, Sheet W 66 64. Directorate of Overseas Surveys, Tolworth, UK, 1976.
- Antarctic Digital Database (ADD). Scale 1:250000 topographic map of Antarctica. Scientific Committee on Antarctic Research (SCAR). Since 1993, regularly upgraded and updated.
