= Vasil Levski National Military University =

Military University

Coordinates: 43°5′5″N 25°36′10″E

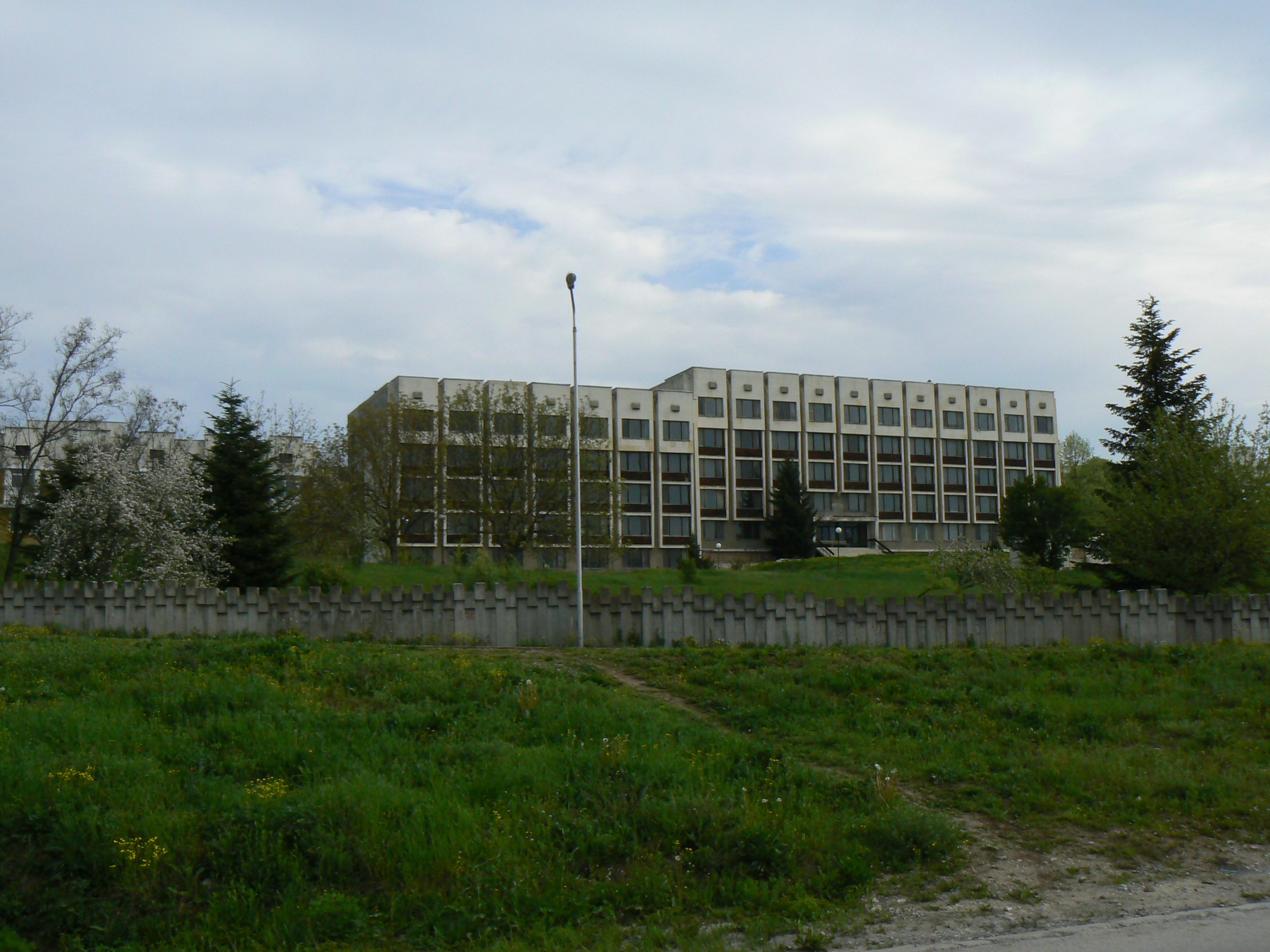
- General view
- Motto: Bulgarian: Времето е в нас и ние сме във времето!
- Established: 26 November 1878
- Rector: Brigadier-General Ivan Georgiev Malamov
- Location: Veliko Tarnovo, Bulgaria
- Website: www.nvu.bg

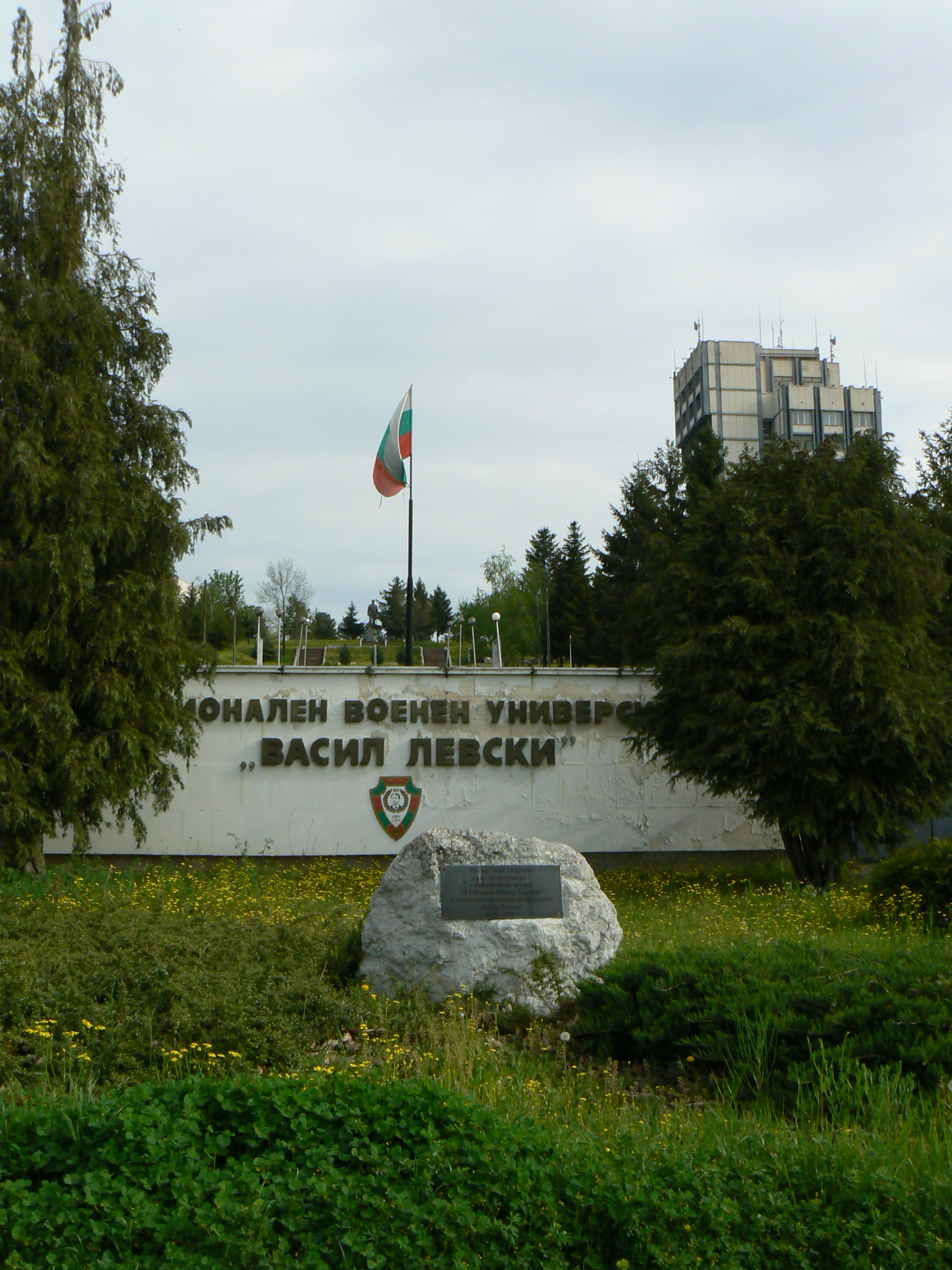
The gateway of the university with the central administrative unit

The Vasil Levski National Military University (Bulgarian: Национален военен университет "Васил Левски", romanized: Natsionalen voenen universitet "Vasil Levski") is Bulgaria's national military academy.

== History ==
Founded in 1878 as a military school in Plovdiv, it was moved to Sofia the same year. On 19 April 1924, it was promoted to university status; in 1945 it was named in honour of Bulgarian national hero Vasil Levski (1837–1873). Since 1958, it has been headquartered in Veliko Tarnovo.

On 14 June 2002, the structure of Bulgarian military academies was reorganized: the Veliko Tarnovo-based Vasil Levski National Military University also covers the artillery academy (now a faculty) in Shumen. (The Georgi Rakovski Military Academy, which functions as a staff college, remains independent while the former air force faculty in Dolna Mitropoliya was separated from the academy in 2020.)
