= Kunino =

Kunino Кунино
- Village
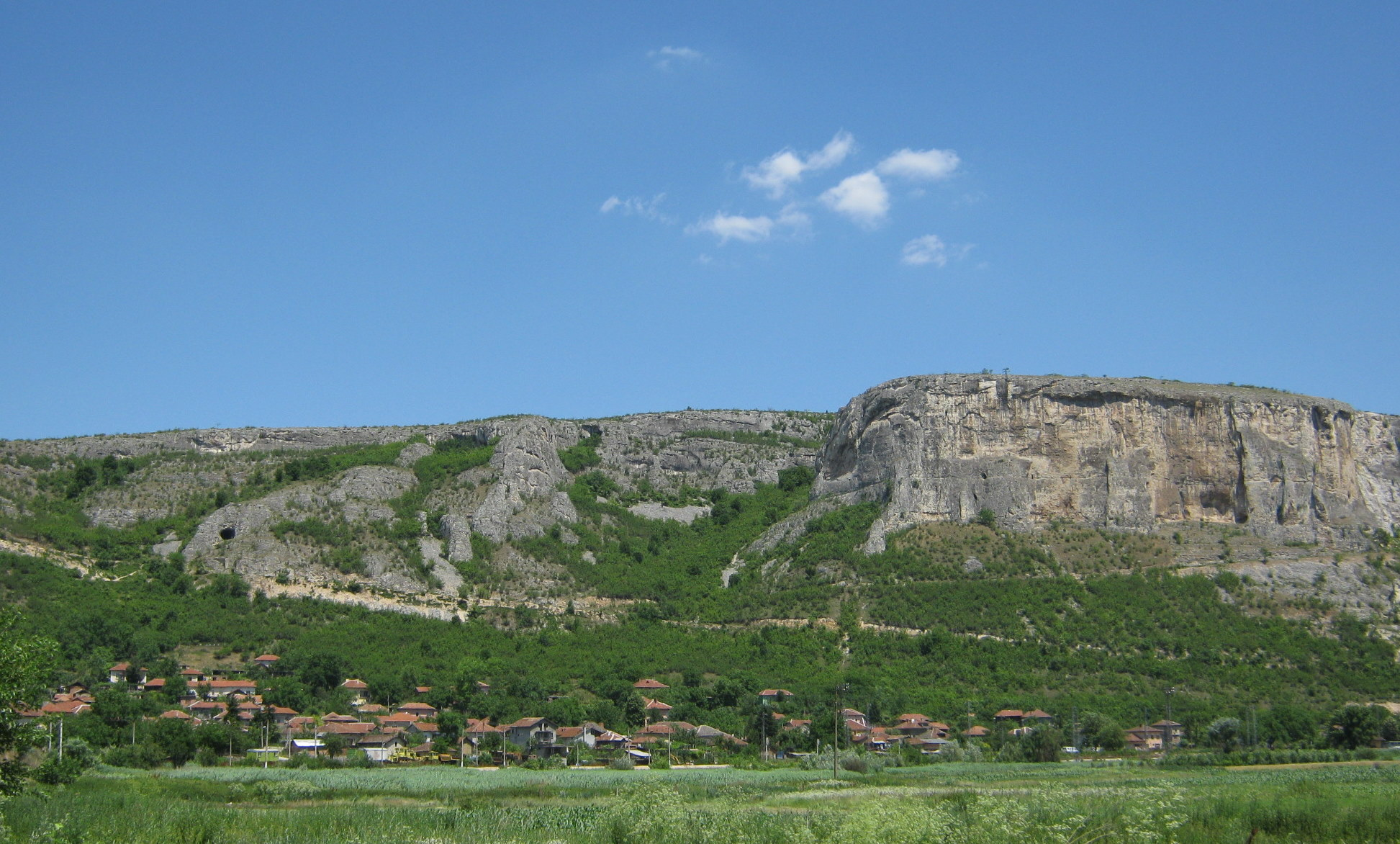
- View of the village

- Location in Bulgaria
- Coordinates: 43°11′21.12″N 23°59′59.33″E
- Country: Bulgaria
- Region: Vratsa
- Municipality: Roman
- Kmet: Yolo Petkov
- Area: 38,801 km^{2} (14,981 sq mi)
- Elevation: 321 m (1,053 ft)
- Population (2018): 478
- Postal code: 3140
- Area code: 091202
- Vehicle registration: BP (Вр)

Kunino (Bulgarian: Кунино) is a village in northern Bulgaria, in the Vratsa region, Roman municipality, on the Iskar River. As of December 15, 2018, the village had a population of 478, according to estimates from the Unified Population Registration System and Population Administrative Services.

== Geography ==
=== Location ===
Kunino is located in the western part of Przedbalkan, which is part of Balkan Mountains. It is located in the Kurlukov Gorge of the Iskar River.

=== Terrain ===
Kunino is surrounded by karst formations. There are numerous limestone rocks in the form of monadnocks and natural arches. The emblematic Czerwenica rock towers over the village. So far, about 140 caves have been discovered in the village area. The longest of these is the 256-meter-long Kashara cave, while the deepest is Glozawa, located up to 69 meters below the surface.

=== Climate ===
The wide-open valley of the Iskar River facilitates the free flow of air and prevents the occurrence of inversions, so air temperatures are high. The surrounding high rock rims cause air masses to rise during the summer. This contributes to the development of clouds and, consequently, more frequent heavy rains and hailstorms.

== Administration ==
Kunino belongs administratively to the municipality of Roman, in the province of Vratsa. Kunino's identification code is 40645.

Administrative territorial affiliation:

- Kmetowns (seats of local government): Vraca oblast (VRC), Roman municipality (VRC32), Kunino (VRC32-03)
- Regions: Northwestern Bulgaria (BG31), Northern and Southeastern Bulgaria (BG3).

The regional statistical office is located in Vratsa.

Kunino covers an area of 38,801 km².

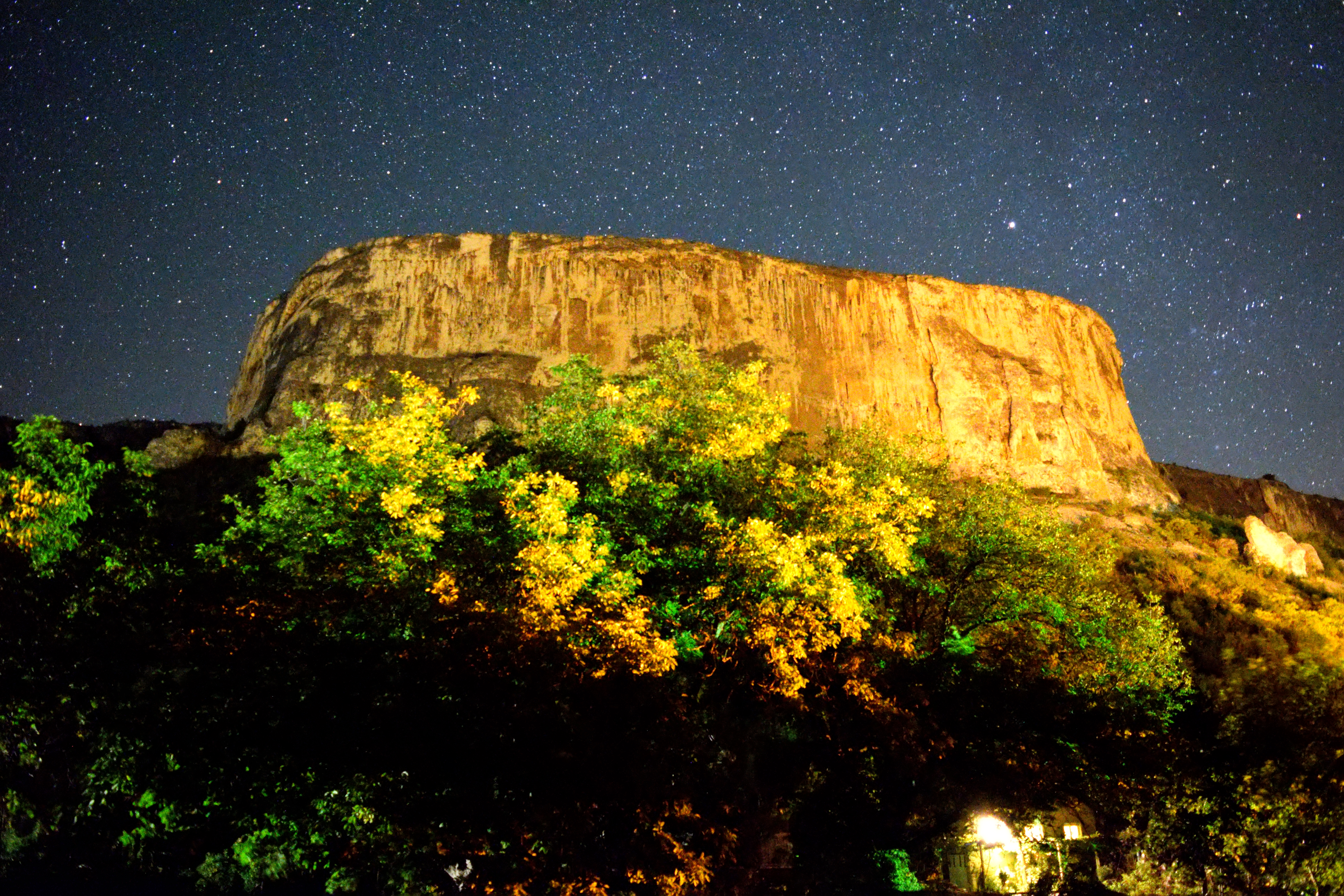
Natural Monument - Czerwenica

== History ==
=== Archaeological discoveries from prehistory ===
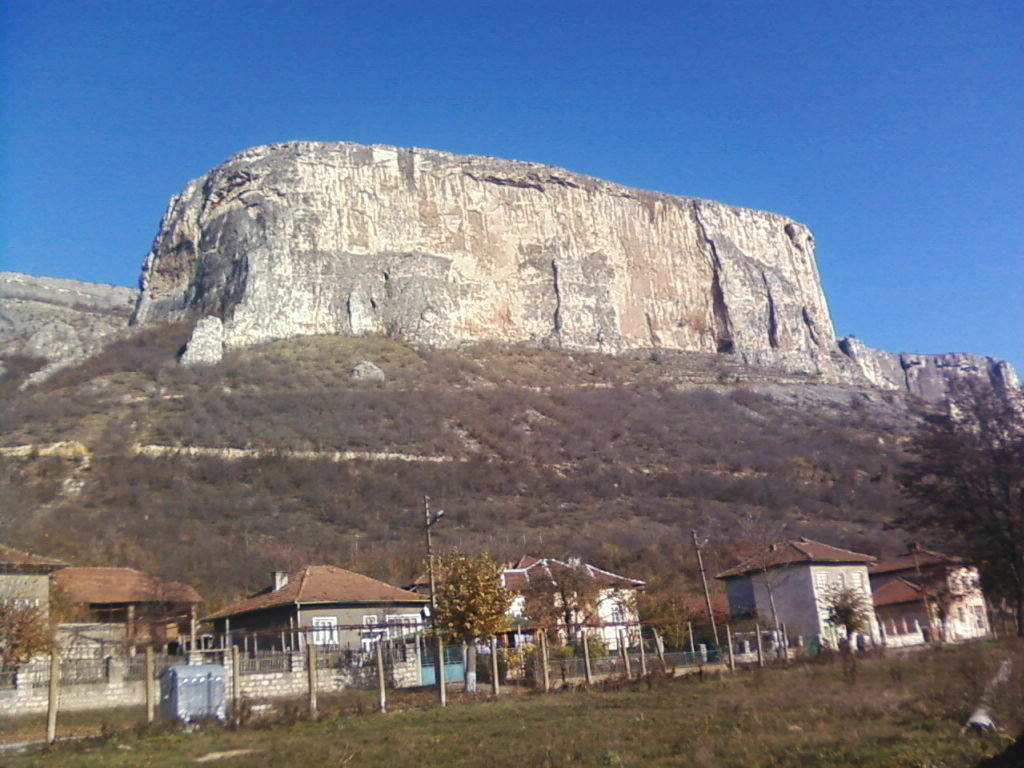
Residential buildings in the background of Czerwenica

There is an archaeological site in Kunino, where Bulgarian archaeologist and prehistorian Vasil Mikov found the remains of a large settlement called Samuilica, dating back to the Neolithic period, located on the Rudina plateau in the Provirtenka cave. He also discovered numerous stone tools, ceramic fragments of figurines, and the most significant find was stones used for grinding grains. This testifies to the advanced level of agriculture in the area at that time. Nikolai Dzhambazov discovered traces of people from the Middle and Late Paleolithic periods in the cave in 1956. In 1960, during the repair of the road to the village of Radovene, the remains of a village dating back 4,000 years were discovered. The research was carried out by Bogdan Nikolov of the Regional Archeological Museum in Vratsa. Excavations revealed the foundations of clay houses, plaster walls, stoves and fireplaces. Stone tools, numerous ornaments, fragments of painted pottery, querns for grinding grain and clay weights for a vertical loom were also discovered.

=== Antiquity ===
In the 1000s BC, the area was inhabited by Thracians from the Tribali tribe. Their presence is evidenced by the discovered village of Trulenzis, as well as uncovered bronze brooches and fragments of bronze horse figurines. Based on the objects found, it was concluded that in the fifth century BC there was a significant Hellenization of the local population. In 28 BC, the settlement was incorporated into the Roman Empire. Over the next three centuries, the village flourished through trade, stonemasonry and winemaking – it was concluded from stone inscriptions and carvings.

=== Middle Ages ===
The area was inhabited by Slavs. Ivan Velekov suggests that the local Slavs originally settled in Emperor Justinian's fortress, but soon abandoned it and settled closer to the Iskar River, at the site of the present village.

=== Ottoman Rule ===
The locality by its present name is mentioned in a timar description from 1479. An important role in the public and political life of Kunino in the first three decades of the 19th century was played by an influential merchant, Dimitraki Khajitoshev, who had a farm and a store for basic goods in the village. Numerous records of business transactions were found in his notes. In 1865, after the Crimean War, the Circassians were expelled from the Russian territories and settled in Bulgaria, including Kunino. The Circassians plundered local homes, which caused their residents to revolt and clash with the invaders.

=== Modern times ===
A historical museum was established in 1888. In 1891, the Tsvetan Ganovsky community center was established. In June 1918, Kunino was hit by a strong tornado, which caused great damage, including destroyed houses, and claimed about 150 cows. In 1921, a stonemasonry school was established. In 1922, a railroad station was built according to a design by Czech engineers.

== Demographics ==
According to the National Statistical Institute, as of February 1, 2011, the age structure of the population in Kunino village was as follows:

Age	0–4	5–9	10–14	15–19	20–24	25–29	30–34	35–39	40–44	45–49	50–54	55–59	60–64	65–59	70–74	75–79	80–84	85 and more
Total	11	7	24	28	23	19	20	16	28	34	36	39	52	54	42	42	26	8

The population mainly emigrates to larger cities in Bulgaria or other countries in search of work.

Nationality	Percentage
Bulgarians	87,82
Others	10,77
Unidentified	1,39

As of 2011, in terms of ethnicity, the village is inhabited mostly by Bulgarians (87.82%). 10.77% of the population is of other ethnic origins.

== Infrastructure ==
=== Social infrastructure ===
The village has a kmetstvo, an elementary school and a stonemasonry school, a community center and a post office. The nearest kindergarten is 6 km from Kunino in the village of Radovene, and the nearest hospital is in the town of Roman.

=== Technical infrastructure ===
The village is sewered and electrified, and has running water, which it gets from Iskar.

=== Transportation ===
Local road 1031 and the Sofia-Varna railroad run through Kunino. There is a railroad station.

== Architecture ==
=== Monuments ===
The register of monuments includes:

- Samuilica cave settlement
- Monument to Kuninians who died in the wars of national unification
- Monument to Kuna Kralica
- Prehistoric settlement in the Markov's Ass cave
- Thracian village of Trulenzis
- Fortress of the Second Bulgarian Empire

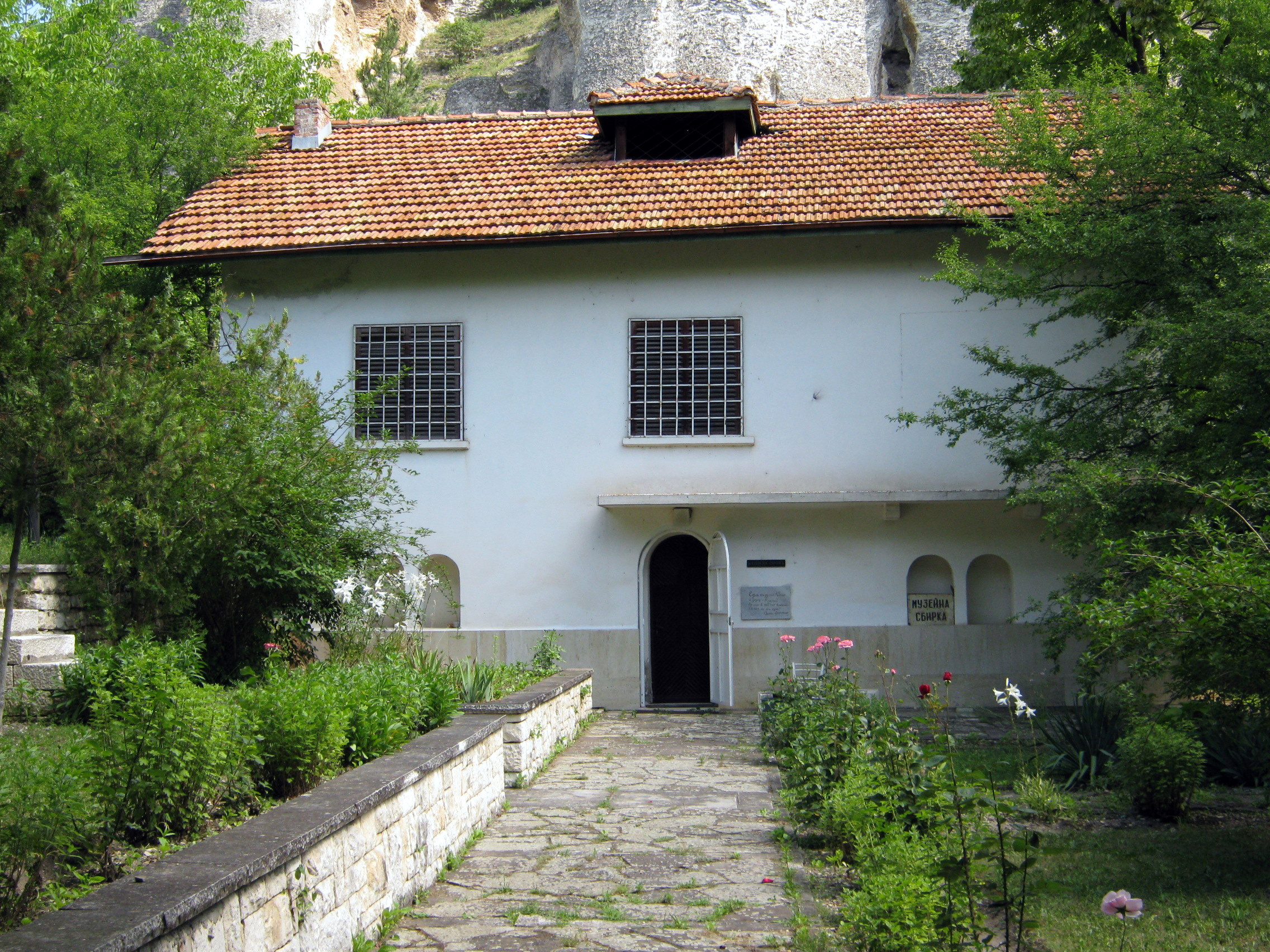
Historical museum

== Culture ==
- Tzveten Ganovski community center - established in 1891 on the initiative of Kunino’s teachers. In 1949 a hall with a cinema was built. The main hall of the community center serves as a theater, where amateur performances are held 2-3 times a year. There is a men's choir and a library.
- Historical Museum - opened on April 4, 1988. It is located on two floors of Sava Genovsky's house. Exhibits related to Kunino's history are displayed on the first floor, while displays on the second floor are entirely devoted to the communist movement in the village.

== Education ==
- Professional stonemasonry school - created by Konstantin Tomov. In 1921, the government issued a decree establishing a stonemasonry school. On November 2, 1921, Czech Rudolf Braun became the first director. The teaching staff was composed of Bulgarians and Czechs. Currently, after graduating from the school, students receive the status of stonemason in the specialty of stonemasonry or the status of artist in the specialty of sculpture.
- Vasil Levski Elementary School - probably had its beginning as early as 1800, was of a religious nature, established by Popa Snako. It trained in the knowledge of liturgical books. In the spring of 1864, a two-story school building with three classrooms and a teacher's room was built. In 1920 a gymnasium was opened, and in 1961 the elementary school and gymnasium were named after Vasil Levski.

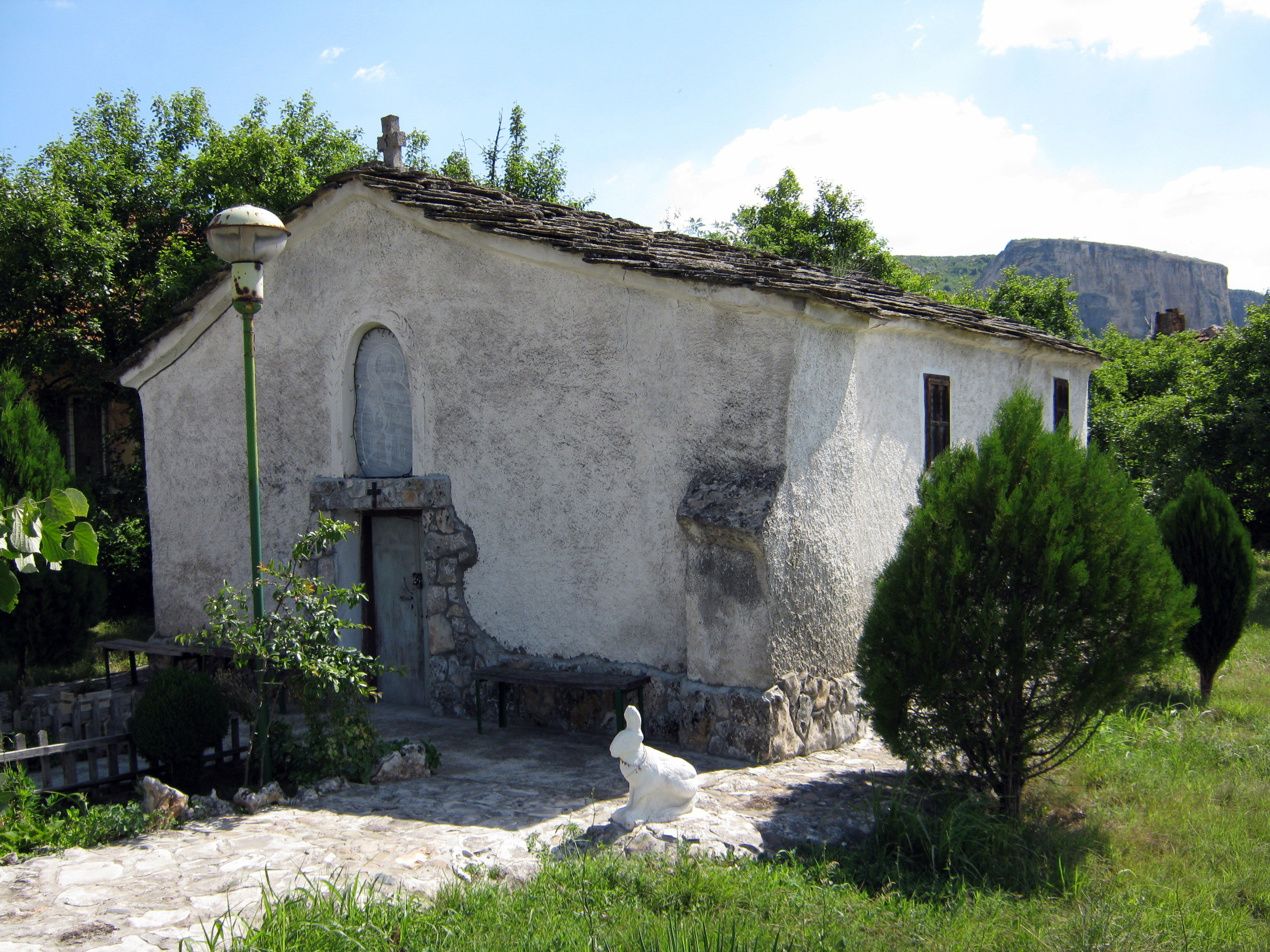
St. Nicholas Orthodox Church

== Religion ==
St. Nicholas Orthodox Church was built in the Middle Ages, and was destroyed by the Turks during Ottoman rule. Thanks to the support of wealthy Kunino's families, St. Nicholas Orthodox Church was restored in the early 17th century. It is built in the style typical of the time - a separate residential building was detached from the nave. It was painted in the late 18th century by Petko Daskalov. In 1945, the Orthodox church was closed and deteriorating. In 1996, volunteers began rebuilding the church, which was consecrated and opened on May 6, 1997.

== Sport ==
The village is home to the FK Stroitl Kunino football club.

== People associated with Kunino ==
- Nikola Korchev (1931–2006) – Bulgarian sculptor and teacher at the Kunino School of Masonry.
- Konstantin Tomov (1888–1935) – Bulgarian Minister of the Interior in Bulgaria. Together with Czech teachers, he opened a stonemasonry school in 1922. He provided funding for the construction of the "Kalcit" factory in the village.

=== Born ===
- Sava Ganovski (1973–1978) – Bulgarian president of the Fifth National Assembly (1966-1971). President of the International Federation of Philosophical Societies (1973-1978).

=== Died ===
- Dimityr Shatoev (1876–1922) – Bulgarian revolutionary WMORO
