= Dolna Mitropoliya =

Town in Bulgaria

Dolna Mitropoliya Долна Митрополия
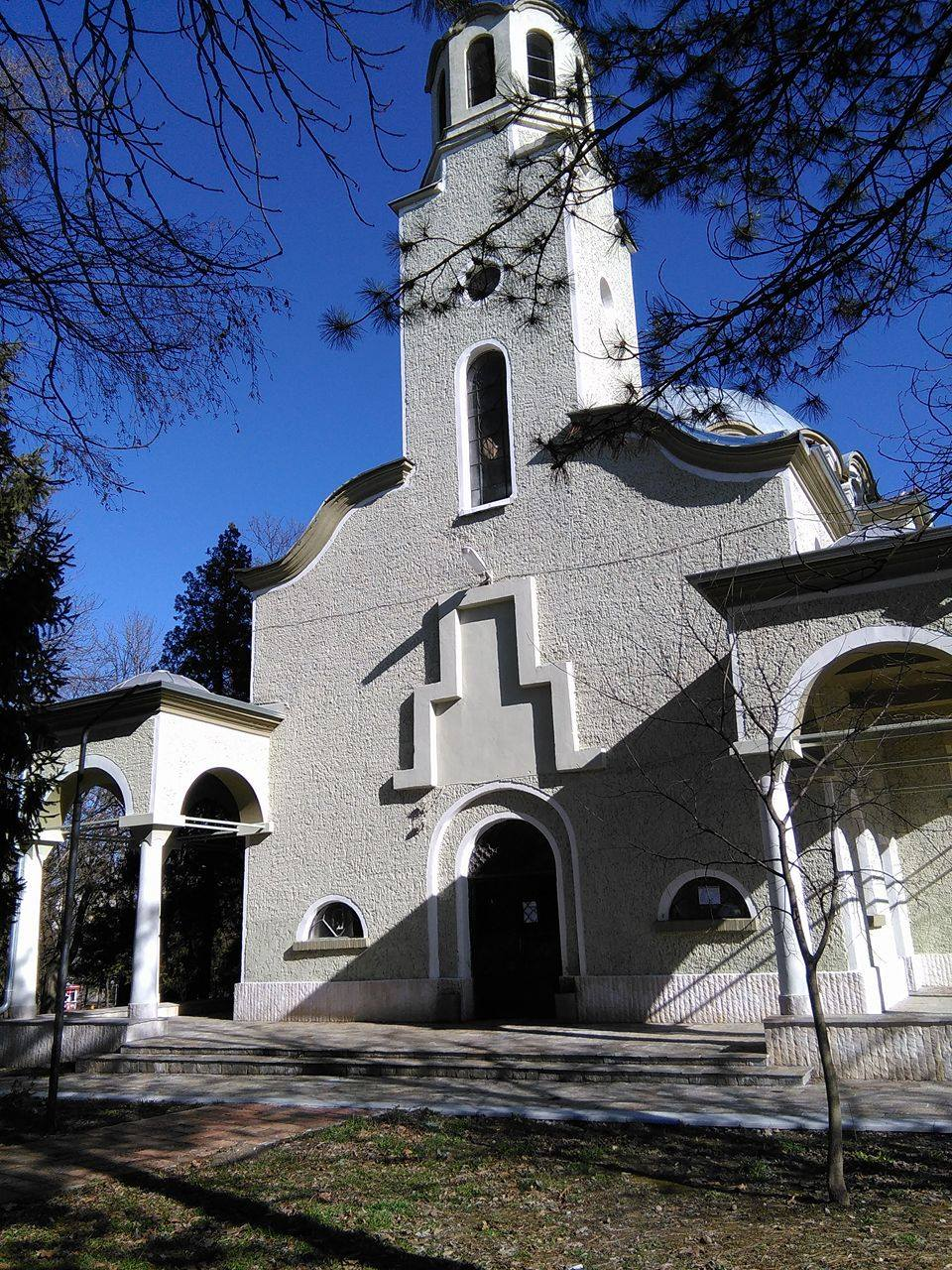
- Saint Demetrius church

- Location within Bulgaria
- Coordinates: 43°28′N 24°32′E
- Country: Bulgaria

Dolna Mitropoliya (Bulgarian: Долна Митрополия [ˈdɔɫnɐ mitropoˈlijɐ], "Lower Bishopric"; also transliterated as Dolna Mitropolia, Dolna Mitropolija) is a town in Pleven Province of northern Bulgaria, the administrative center of Dolna Mitropoliya municipality. It is about 10 km northwest of the city of Pleven. As of December 2009, the town had a population of 3,303.

Adjacent to the town is Dolna Mitropoliya Air Base, home of the aviation faculty of the National Defence University. The 12th Air Training Wing is stationed there. The aviation school was created in 1945 and named after Georgi Benkovski. The school moved to Dolna Mitropoliya in 1948, and in 2002 was incorporated as part of the National Defence University.

Dolna Mitropoliya has the second Bulgarian automobile race track, and its first and only supermoto track. The first motorcycle race was held there in 1992.
