= Lens Peak =

Mountain in Antarctica

- Location within Antarctica

Highest point
- Elevation: 500 m (1,600 ft)
- Coordinates: 66°8′S 65°22′W

Geography
- Location: Antarctica
- Parent range: Graham Land

Climbing
- First ascent: Unknown
- Easiest route: Glacier/snow climb

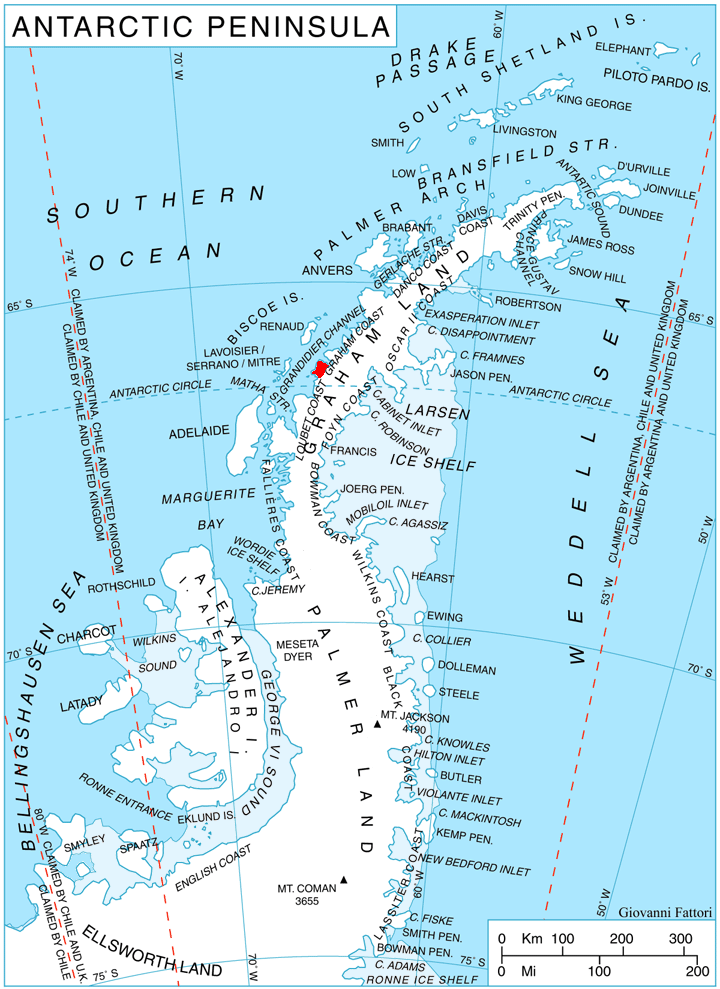
Location of Stresher Peninsula on Graham Land, Antarctic Peninsula.

Lens Peak (66°8′S 65°24′W) is a peak at the south side of Holtedahl Bay just east of Conway Island, on the northeast coast of Stresher Peninsula on the west coast of Graham Land, Antarctica. It was photographed by Hunting Aerosurveys Ltd in 1956–57, and mapped from these photos by the Falkland Islands Dependencies Survey. The peak was named by the UK Antarctic Place-Names Committee in 1960 from association with a group of features in the area commemorating pioneers of research on snow blindness and the design of snow goggles.
