= Osikovo Ridge =

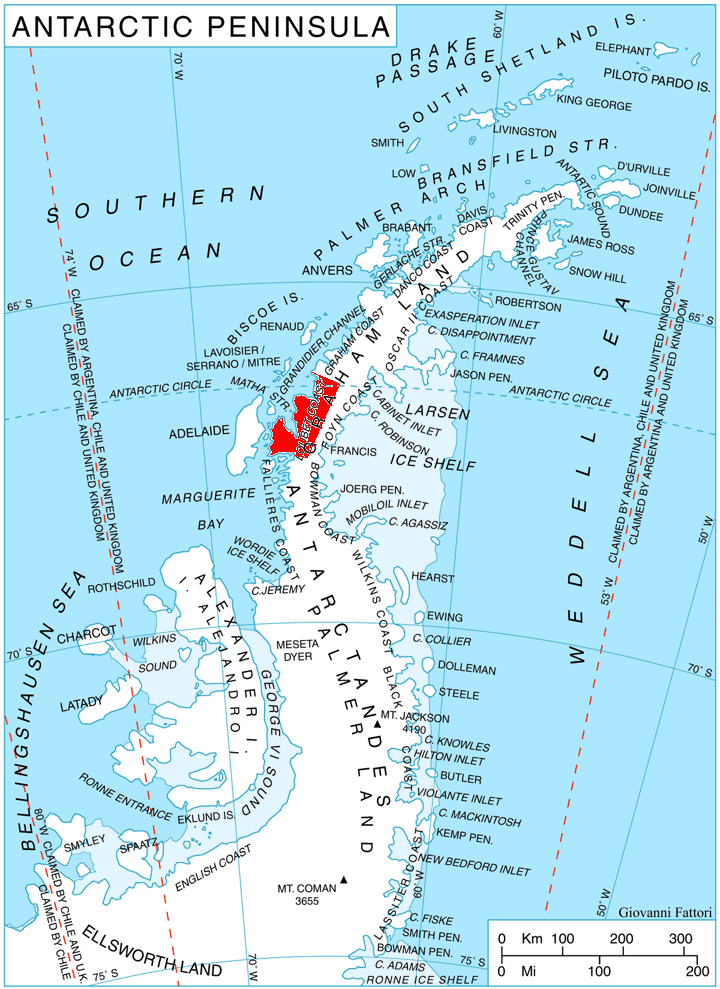
Location of Loubet Coast on the Antarctic Peninsula.

Osikovo Ridge (Bulgarian: Осиковски рид, ‘Osikovski Rid’ \o-si-'kov-ski 'rid\) is the ice-covered ridge extending 12 km in south-southeast to north-northwest direction and 3 km wide, with a northern height rising to 1644 and southern one to 2009 m at the head of Darbel Bay on Loubet Coast in Graham Land, Antarctica. It surmounts McCance Glacier to the west and Widdowson Glacier to the east.

The ridge is named after the settlements of Osikovo in Northeastern, Southern and Southwestern Bulgaria.

== Location ==
Osikovo Ridge is centred at 66°49′00″S 65°43′40″W, which is 11.8 km south-southeast of Rubner Peak, 4.6 km west-southwest of Ushlinova Peak and 10.73 km north-northwest of Hutchison Hill. British mapping in 1976.

== Maps ==
- Antarctic Digital Database (ADD). Scale 1:250000 topographic map of Antarctica. Scientific Committee on Antarctic Research (SCAR). Since 1993, regularly upgraded and updated.
- British Antarctic Territory. Scale 1:200000 topographic map. DOS 610 Series, Sheet W 66 64. Directorate of Overseas Surveys, Tolworth, UK, 1976.
