= Kudelin Point =

Location in Antarctica

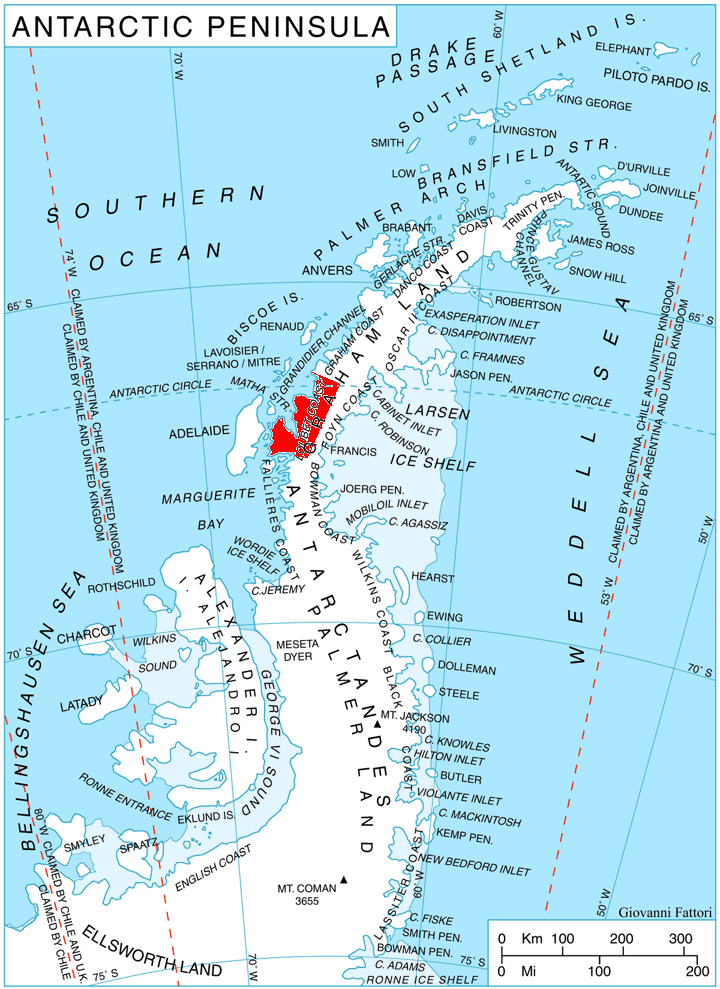
Location of Loubet Coast on the Antarctic Peninsula.

Kudelin Point (Bulgarian: нос Куделин, ‘Nos Kudelin’) is the point on the northeast side of the entrance to Tlachene Cove on Loubet Coast, Antarctic Peninsula. The point is formed by an offshoot of Gaydari Peak and was shaped as a result of the retreat of Hopkins Glacier during the last two decades of the 20th century. The point is named after the settlement of Kudelin in Northwestern Bulgaria.

== Location ==
Kudelin Point is located at 66°34′50″S 65°44′02″W, which is 27.4 km east of Madell Point, 18.3 km south of Phantom Point and 2.55 km northeast of Gostilya Point. British mapping in 1976.

== Maps ==
- British Antarctic Territory. Scale 1:200000 topographic map. DOS 610 Series, Sheet W 66 64. Directorate of Overseas Surveys, Tolworth, UK, 1976.
- Antarctic Digital Database (ADD). Scale 1:250000 topographic map of Antarctica. Scientific Committee on Antarctic Research (SCAR). Since 1993, regularly upgraded and updated.
