= Ushlinova Peak =

Mountain in Antarctica

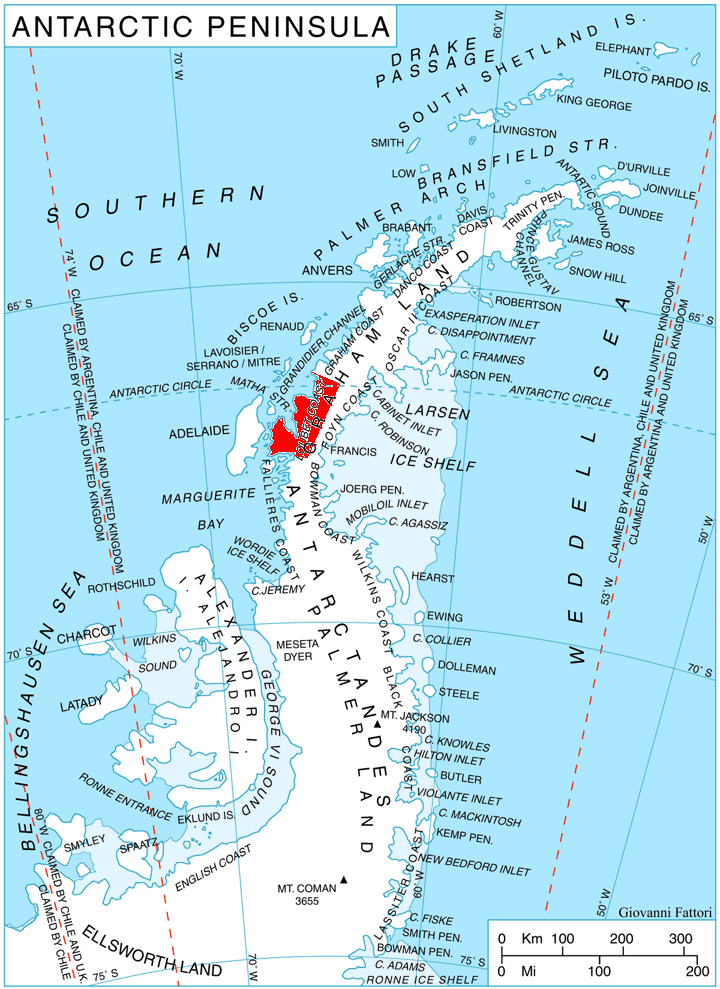
Location of Loubet Coast on the Antarctic Peninsula.

Ushlinova Peak (Bulgarian: връх Ушлинова, romanized: vrah Ushlinova, IPA: [ˈvrɤx oʃˈlinovɐ]) is the sharp ice-covered peak of elevation 2130 m in the west foothills of Avery Plateau on Loubet Coast in Graham Land, Antarctica. It surmounts Widdowson Glacier to the west and a tributary to that glacier to the northeast.

The peak is named after Donka Ushlinova (1880–1937), a participant in the Bulgarian liberation movement in Macedonia, much decorated for her bravery in the 1912–1918 wars of national unification.

== Location ==
Ushlinova Peak is located at 66°48′10″S 65°37′44″W, which is 13.66 km southeast of Rubner Peak, 14 km south-southeast of Sokol Point on Darbel Bay, 9.63 km southwest of the nearest of Zilva Peaks, and 12.1 km north of Hutchison Hill. British mapping in 1976.

== Maps ==
- Antarctic Digital Database (ADD). Scale 1:250000 topographic map of Antarctica. Scientific Committee on Antarctic Research (SCAR), 1993–2016.
- British Antarctic Territory. Scale 1:200000 topographic map. DOS 610 Series, Sheet W 66 64. Directorate of Overseas Surveys, Tolworth, UK, 1976.
