= Kladnitsa Peak =

Mountain in Antarctica

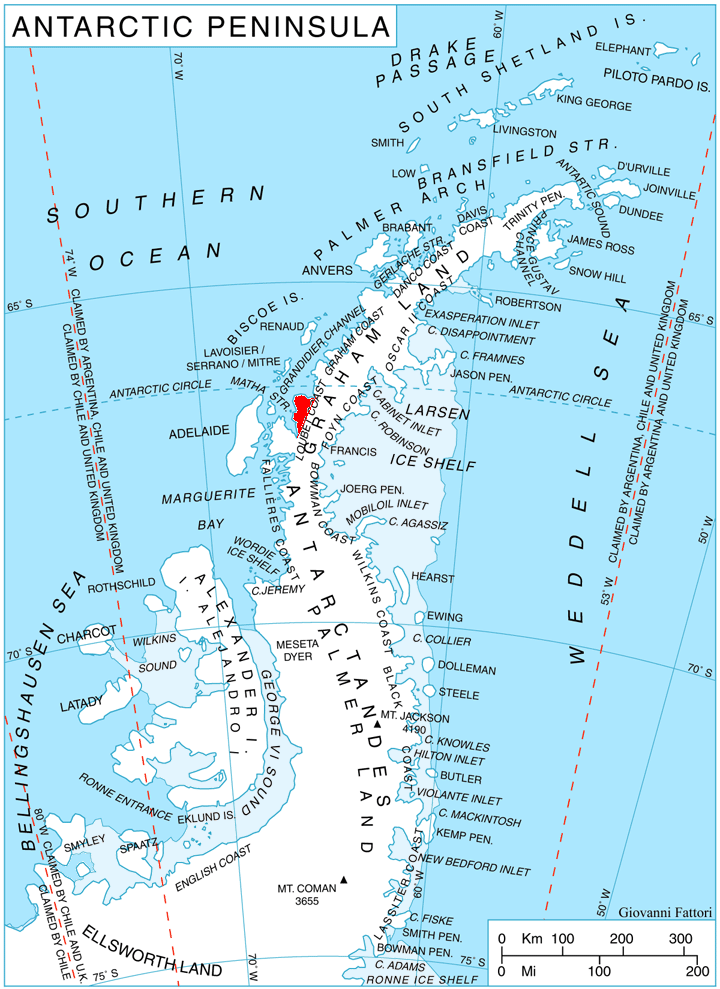
Location of Pernik Peninsula on Loubet Coast, Antarctic Peninsula.

Kladnitsa Peak (Bulgarian: връх Кладница, romanized: vrah Kladnitsa, IPA: [ˈvrɤx ˈkɫadnit͡sɐ]) is the ice-covered peak of elevation 1103 m on Pernik Peninsula, Loubet Coast in Graham Land, Antarctica. It surmounts McCance Glacier to the south and west, and Darbel Bay to the northeast.

The peak is named after the settlement of Kladnitsa in Western Bulgaria.

== Location ==
Kladnitsa Peak is located at 66°46′14″S 65°50′08″W, which is 7.36 km east of Liebig Peak, 5 km south-southeast of Rubner Peak, 10.68 km southwest of Sokol Point and 9.77 km west-northwest of Ushlinova Peak. British mapping in 1976.

== Maps ==
- Antarctic Digital Database (ADD). Scale 1:250000 topographic map of Antarctica. Scientific Committee on Antarctic Research (SCAR). Since 1993, regularly upgraded and updated.
- British Antarctic Territory. Scale 1:200000 topographic map. DOS 610 Series, Sheet W 66 64. Directorate of Overseas Surveys, Tolworth, UK, 1976.
