= Gostilya =

Gostilya may refer to:

- Gostilya, Pleven Province, a village in Bulgaria
- Gostilya (river), a river in Bulgaria

== See also ==
- Gostilya Point, a location on Antarctica
