= Sherba Ridge =

Mountain in Antarctica

- рид Шерба (Rid Sherba)
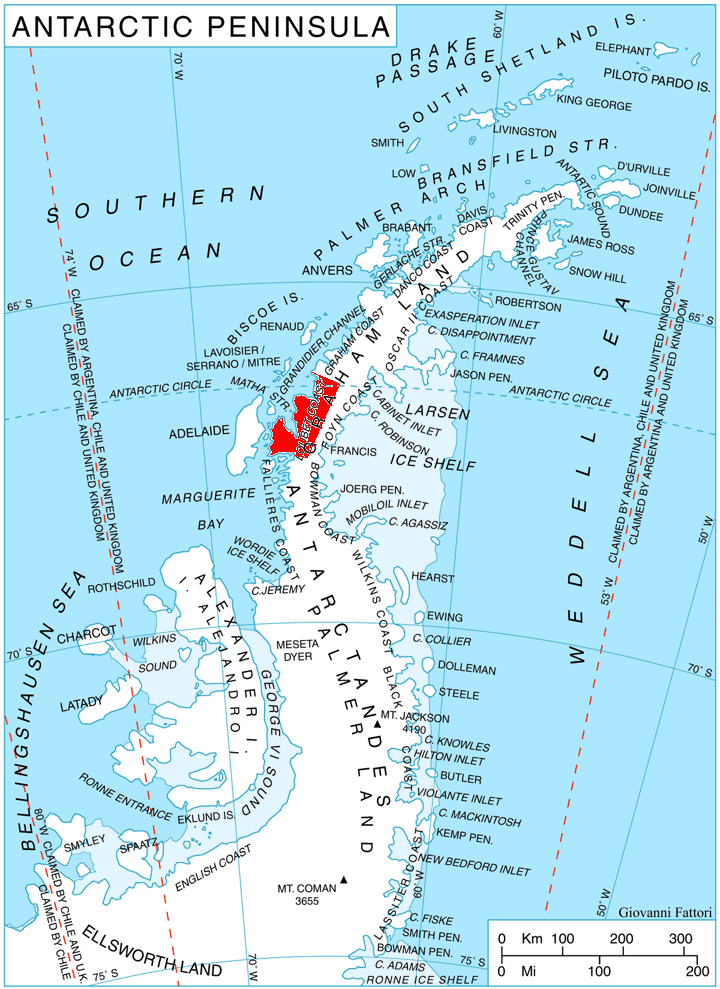
- Location of Loubet Coast on the Antarctic Peninsula

Highest point
- Elevation: 2,143 m (7,031 ft)
- Coordinates: 66°45′23″S 65°34′50″W

Dimensions
- Length: 13 km (8.1 mi)
- Width: 6 km (3.7 mi)

Geography
- Location: Loubet Coast, Graham Land, Antarctica
- Parent range: Avery Plateau foothills

Sherba Ridge (Bulgarian: рид Шерба, ‘Rid Sherba’ \'rid 'sher-ba\ is the ice-covered ridge extending 13 km in southeast-northwest direction and 6 km wide, with a northern height rising to 2096 m, central one rising to 2099 and southern to 2143 m in the west foothills of Avery Plateau on Loubet Coast in Graham Land, Antarctica. It has steep and partly ice-free southwest, north and east slopes, and surmounts Widdowson Glacier to the southwest, Darbel Bay to the northwest, and Drummond Glacier to the northeast and east.

The ridge is named after the locality of Sherba in eastern Balkan Mountains.

== Location ==
Sherba Ridge is centred at 66°45′23″S 65°34′50″W, which is 13.4 km east-southeast of Rubner Peak, 11.2 km south of Voit Peak and 6.68 km west of Zilva Peaks. British mapping in 1976.

== Maps ==
- British Antarctic Territory. Scale 1:200000 topographic map. DOS 610 Series, Sheet W 66 64. Directorate of Overseas Surveys, Tolworth, UK, 1976.
- Antarctic Digital Database (ADD). Scale 1:250000 topographic map of Antarctica. Scientific Committee on Antarctic Research (SCAR). Since 1993, regularly upgraded and updated.
