= Srebra Apostolova =

Macedonian Bulgarian revolutionary (1886–1942)

- Сребра Апостолова
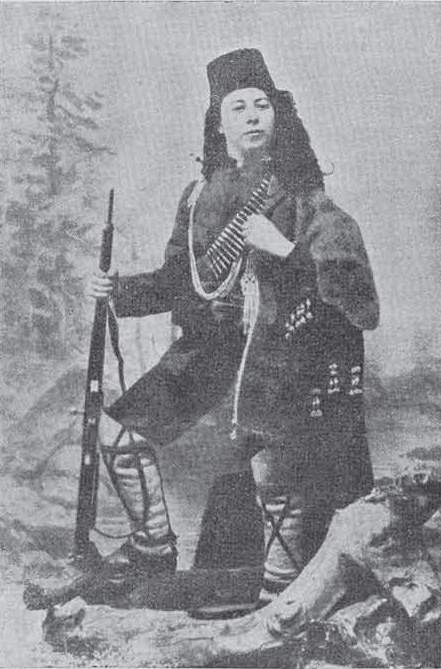
- Apolostolova (c. 1903)
- Born: Srebra Dimova Domazetova; 8 November 1886; Lera, Bitola, Ottoman Empire (today North Macedonia)
- Died: 31 January 1942 (aged 55); Varna, Bulgaria
- Organisation: Internal Macedonian Revolutionary Organisation
- Spouse: Apostol Iliev (m. 1902–1942)
- Parents: Dimo Domazetov (father); Petrana Domazetova (mother)

Srebra Apostolova Ushlinova (née Dimova Domazetova; 1886–1942) was a Macedonian Bulgarian revolutionary.

== Biography ==
Srebra Dimova Domazetova was born in the village of Lera in Bitola, then in the Ottoman Empire, into the family of Dimo Ivanov Domazetov and Petrana Domazetova. In 1901, she was inducted into the Internal Macedonian Revolutionary Organisation (VMRO) by Temelko Spasov.

She married Apostol Iliev (taking the name "Apostolova") and together with him and Donka Ushlinova, she assassinated the local bey Djelep Redjo Sulyov. The three then fled into the forests of Resen, where they found the voevod Slaveyko Arsov's troops, who dressed them in chetnik uniforms. After the Ilinden–Preobrazhenie Uprising, they joined Georgi Sugarev's chetniks. Apostolova's mother Petrana Dimova was arrested, convicted and lay in prison until the Young Turk Revolution in 1908, when she was released and died shortly afterwards. After the uprising, Apostolova and Iliev moved to the independent Kingdom of Bulgaria and settled in Varna, where they had four children and lived in poverty.

Apostolova died on 31 January 1942. The chairman of the Ilinden Society, Hristo Nastev, spoke at her funeral at the Dormition of the Mother of God Cathedral. During the Bulgarian occupation of Macedonia, the inhabitants of Lera founded the Donka and Srebra Community Centre, named after the two heroines of the village. The foundation stone of the community center was laid on 27 June 1943.
