= Sokol Point =

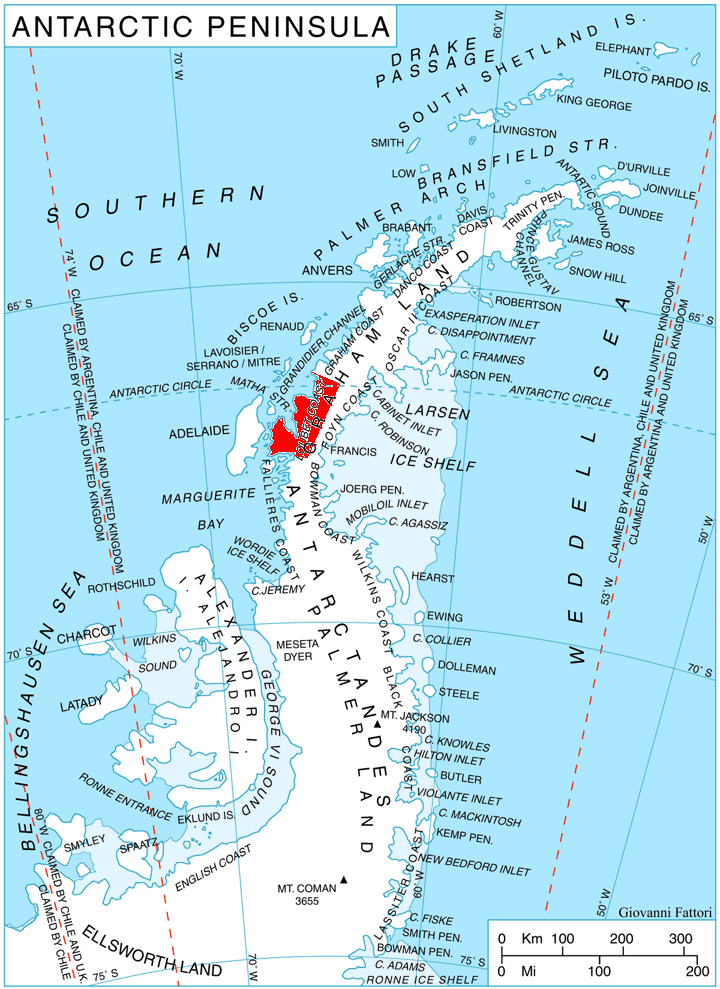
Location of Loubet Coast on the Antarctic Peninsula.

Sokol Point (Bulgarian: нос Сокол, ‘Nos Sokol’ \'nos so-'kol\) is the narrow hilly point projecting 1.9 km into Darbel Bay on Loubet Coast in Graham Land, Antarctica. It is formed by an offshoot of Sherba Ridge, and separates the glacier termini of Drummond Glacier to the east and Widdowson Glacier to the south.

The point is named after the settlements of Sokol in Northeastern and Southeastern Bulgaria.

== Location ==
Sokol Point is located at 66°41′03″S 65°43′56″W, which is 8.1 km northeast of Rubner Peak, 29.35 km east-southeast of Madell Point, 43.4 km south of Cape Bellue, 9.65 km south of Gostilya Point and 9.4 km west-southwest of Voit Peak. British mapping in 1976.

== Maps ==
- Antarctic Digital Database (ADD). Scale 1:250000 topographic map of Antarctica. Scientific Committee on Antarctic Research (SCAR). Since 1993, regularly upgraded and updated.
- British Antarctic Territory. Scale 1:200000 topographic map. DOS 610 Series, Sheet W 66 64. Directorate of Overseas Surveys, Tolworth, UK, 1976.
