= Gaydari Peak =

Mountain in Antarctica

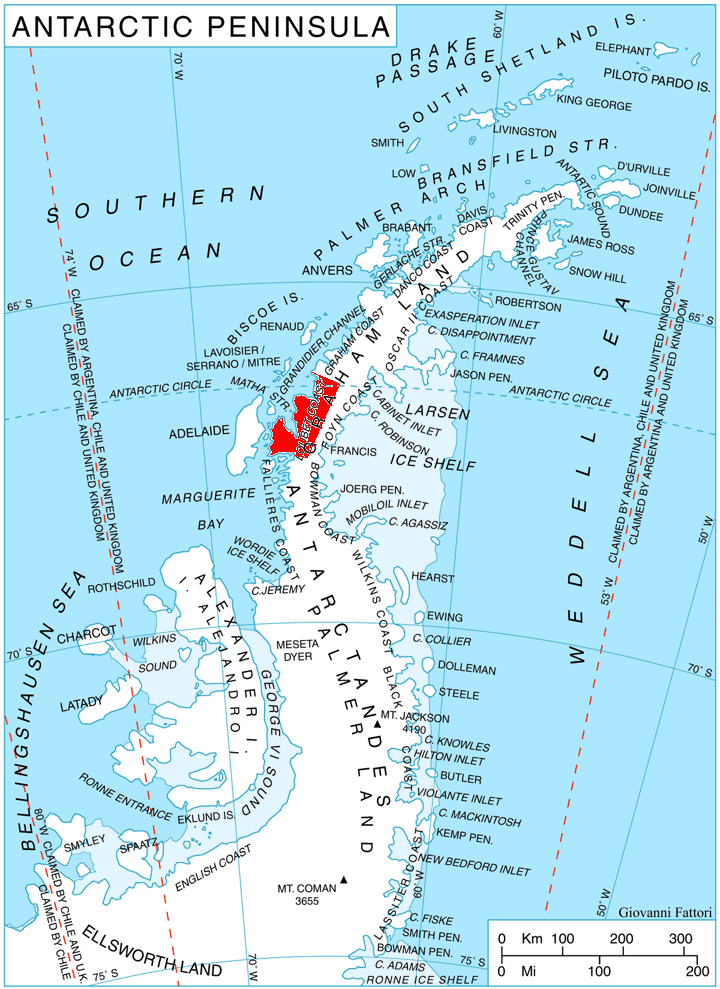
Location of Loubet Coast on the Antarctic Peninsula.

Gaydari Peak (Bulgarian: връх Гайдари, romanized: vrah Gaydari, IPA: [ˈvrɤɣ ɡɐjˈdari]) is the ice-covered peak rising to 852 m on the coast of Darbel Bay on Loubet Coast in Graham Land, Antarctica. It surmounts Darbel Bay to the west and its part Tlachene Cove to the south, and Hopkins Glacier to the southeast.

The peak is named after the settlement of Gaydari in the Northern Bulgaria.

== Location ==
Gaydari Peak is located at 66°33′58″S 65°41′25″W, which is 16.3 km southwest of Roygos Ridge, 10.48 km west of Mount Bain and 12.5 km northwest of Voit Peak. British mapping in 1976.

== Maps ==
- Antarctic Digital Database (ADD). Scale 1:250000 topographic map of Antarctica. Scientific Committee on Antarctic Research (SCAR). Since 1993, regularly upgraded and updated.
- British Antarctic Territory. Scale 1:200000 topographic map. DOS 610 Series, Sheet W 66 64. Directorate of Overseas Surveys, Tolworth, UK, 1976.
