= Gostilya Point =

Headland in Antarctica

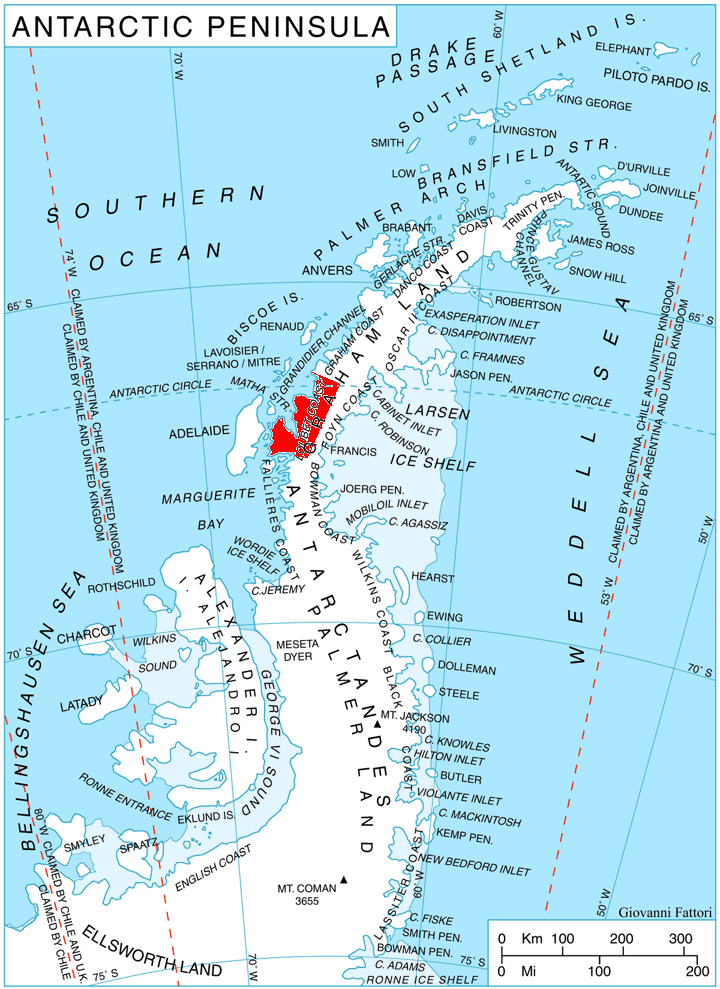
Location of Loubet Coast on the Antarctic Peninsula.

Gostilya Point (Bulgarian: нос Гостиля, romanized: Nos Gostilya \'nos go-'sti-lya\) is the point on the southwest side of the entrance to Tlachene Cove on Loubet Coast, Antarctic Peninsula. The point was formed as a result of the retreat of Hopkins Glacier during the last two decades of the 20th century.

The feature is named after the settlement of Gostilya in Northern Bulgaria.

== Location ==
Gostilya Point is located at 66°35′55″S 65°46′09″W, which is 25.85 km east of Madell Point, 20.6 km south of Phantom Point and 2.55 km southwest of Kudelin Point. British mapping in 1976.

== Maps ==
- British Antarctic Territory. Scale 1:200000 topographic map. DOS 610 Series, Sheet W 66 64. Directorate of Overseas Surveys, Tolworth, UK, 1976.
- Antarctic Digital Database (ADD). Scale 1:250000 topographic map of Antarctica. Scientific Committee on Antarctic Research (SCAR). Since 1993, regularly upgraded and updated.
