= Donka Ushlinova =

Female revolutionary (1880–1937)

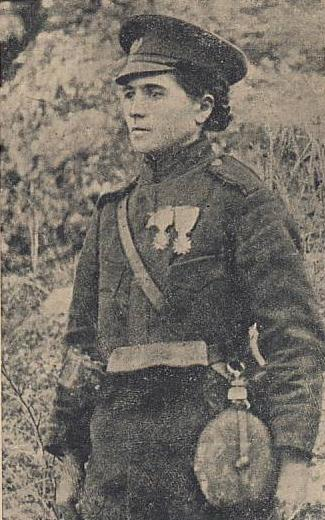
Donka Ushlinova

Donka Ushlinova (21 December 1880 – 27 June 1937) was a participant in the Bulgarian liberation movement in Macedonia. She was a Macedonian revolutionary, member and leader of the Macedonian Revolutionary Organization. She participated in the Ilinden Uprising, the Balkan Wars, and World War I. She later became a Non-commissioned officer in the Bulgarian army.

== Early life ==
Donka Ushlinova was born on 21 December 1880 in the village of Smilevo, Bitola district, where she spent her childhood. At the age of 15, she married Stavre Hristov from the neighboring village of Lera, Bitola. In August 1902, with the help of her husband's brother Apostol Iliev and his wife Srebra Apostolova, Ushlinova killed a Turk who was harassing her while her husband was on work in Constantinople. They buried the dead in a local cemetery before fleeing to the nearby mountain in order to avoid the retaliation from the Turks.

== Revolutionary activities ==
On their way, Apostol, Srebra and Ushlinova encountered the company of the Duke of Slaveyko Arsov, Resen Revolutionary region, who gave them uniforms. Subsequently, Ushlinova and Srebra became the first women to join the Macedonian Revolutionary Organization which was headed by Slaveyko Arsov, and fought against Ottoman Empire in Macedonia.

=== Ilinden uprising ===
In 1903, during the Ilinden uprising, Ushlinova participated in several battles that took place in the Bitola Revolutionary District. In 1904, Ushlinova, Srebra and Apostol joined Duke Georgi Sugarev's company after the murder of Duke Slavejko Arsov. Following the suppression of the uprising, Ushlinova together with Srebra and Apostol returned to Sofia, Bulgaria. Later, Ushlinova alone moved to Varna where she met her husband Stavre.

=== Balkan wars ===
Ushlinova and Stavre became volunteers of the Macedonian-Odrina militia and fought the Balkan wars.

=== First World War ===
During the First World War, Ushlinova and Stavre again volunteered to join the second Macedonian Infantry Regiment. They participated in the battles that took place at Jarebichna, Dojran, Krusha and Planina.

== Awards and honours ==
Ushlinova was awarded medals for courage of III and IV orders for the heroism shown during the battles. For her bravery in combat, Ushlinova was awarded the Order of Courage of the Second Degree. In 1917, she received the Order of Courage of the First Degree and the rank of Non-commissioned officer, which was personally awarded by General Nikola Zhekov. Ushlinova and her husband received financial assistance of 10,000 BGN from the Bulgarian state after demobilization. She was a member of the reserve officers' society of Varna, Friendly Union.

=== Ushlinova Peak ===
In Bulgaria, a peak was named after her for her bravery in the 1912–1918 wars of national unification.

== Death ==
Ushlinova died on 27 June 1937 in Varna, Bulgaria.
