= Gaydari =

Coordinates: 42°51′N 25°35′E

- Village
- Interactive map of Gaydari
- Country: Bulgaria
- Province: Gabrovo Province
- Municipality: Tryavna
- Time zone: UTC+2 (EET)
  - Summer (DST): UTC+3 (EEST)

Gaydari is a village in Tryavna Municipality, in Gabrovo Province, in northern central Bulgaria.

Gaydari Peak on Graham Land, Antarctica is named after the village.
