= McCance Glacier =

Glacier in Antarctica

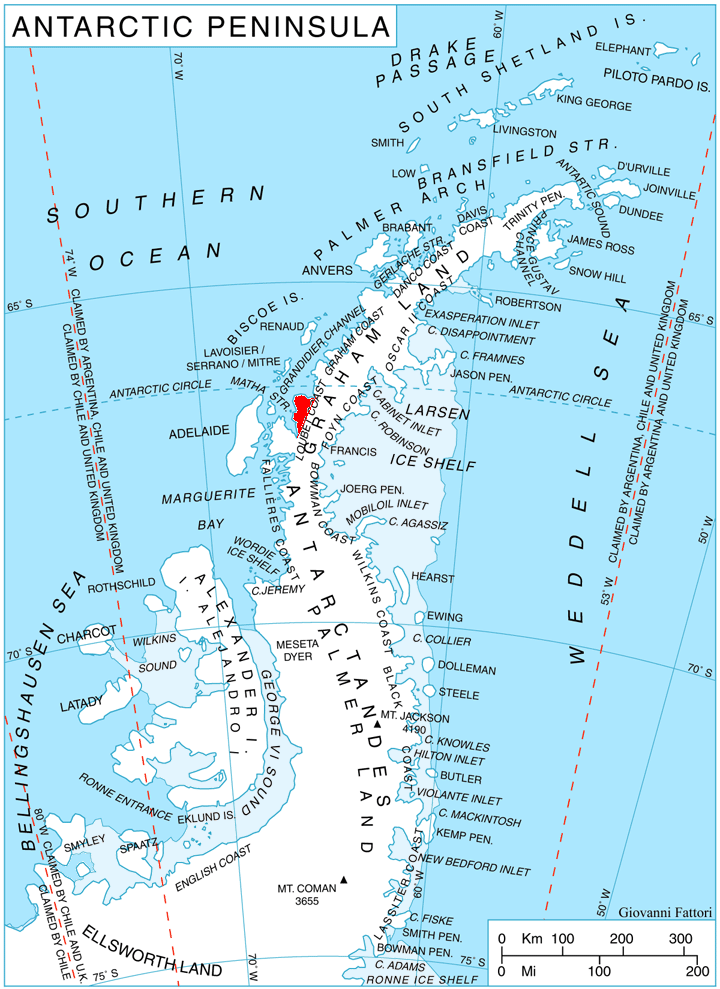
Location of Pernik Peninsula on Loubet Coast, Antarctic Peninsula.

McCance Glacier (66°43′S 65°55′W) is the 30-km long and 5 km wide glacier draining the Hutchison Hill area on the west slopes of Avery Plateau on Loubet Coast in Graham Land, Antarctica. It flows north-northwestwards along the west side of Osikovo Ridge, Kladnitsa Peak and Rubner Peak and enters Darbel Bay.

The glacier was photographed by Hunting Aerosurveys Ltd in 1955–57, and mapped from these photos by the Falkland Islands Dependencies Survey. It was named by the UK Antarctic Place-Names Committee for Robert A. McCance of the Department of Experimental Medicine, Cambridge University, who gave great help in the calculation of concentrated sledging rations for British polar expeditions during the period 1938–58.

== Maps ==
- Antarctic Digital Database (ADD). Scale 1:250000 topographic map of Antarctica. Scientific Committee on Antarctic Research (SCAR), 1993–2016.
- British Antarctic Territory. Scale 1:200000 topographic map. DOS 610 Series, Sheet W 66 64. Directorate of Overseas Surveys, Tolworth, UK, 1976.
