= Drummond Glacier =

Glacier in Antarctica

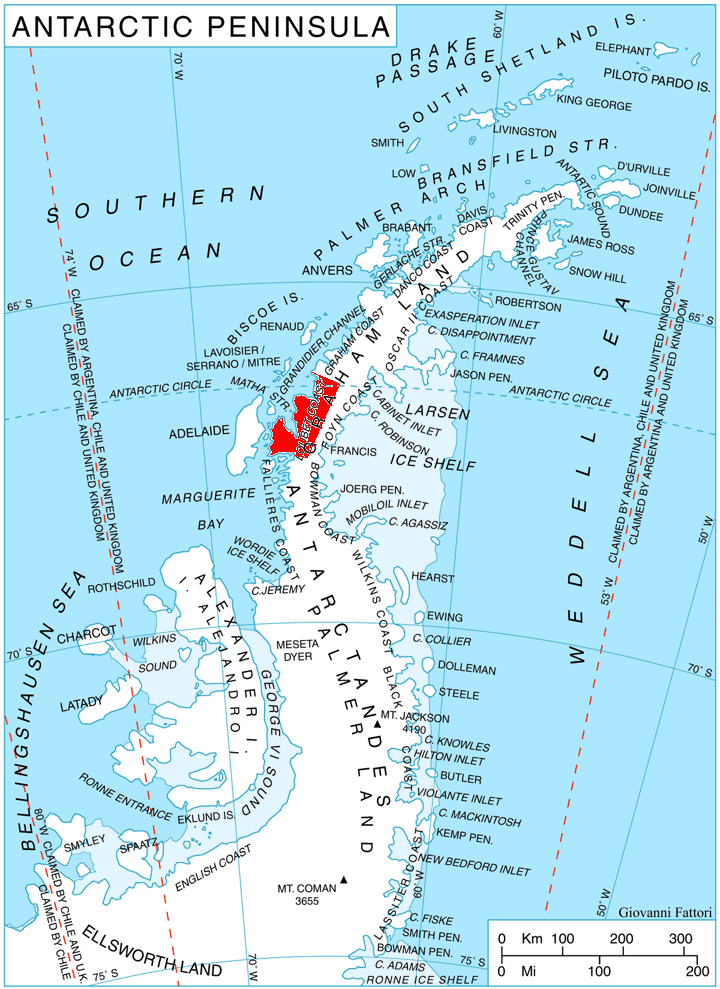
Location of Loubet Coast on the Antarctic Peninsula.

Drummond Glacier (66°40′S 65°43′W) is a glacier 10 nautical miles (18 km) long and 2 nautical miles (4 km) wide, on the west coast of Graham Land, situated south of Hopkins Glacier and flowing west-northwest between Voit Peak and Sherba Ridge into Darbel Bay east of Sokol Point.

The glacier was first roughly surveyed by the Falkland Islands Dependencies Survey in 1946–47, and named "West Balch Glacier". With East Balch Glacier it was reported to fill a transverse depression across Graham Land, but a further survey in 1957 showed that there is no close topographical alignment between the two. The name Balch has been limited to the east glacier and an entirely new name approved for this glacier. It is now named after Sir Jack C. Drummond, professor of biochemistry at the University of London, who helped in the selection and calculation of the sledging rations of many British polar expeditions between World War I and World War II.
