= Gostilya (river) =

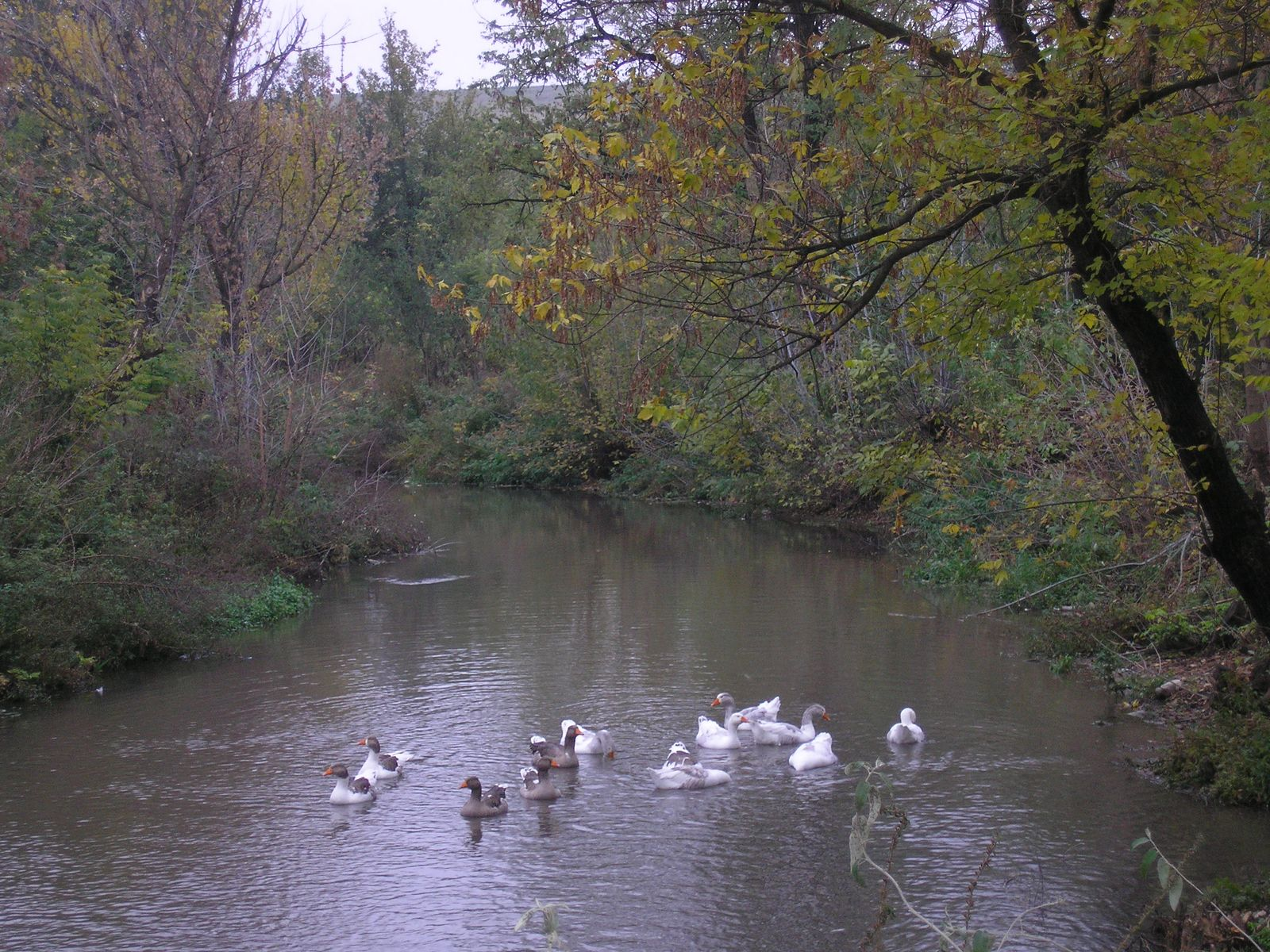

Location
- Country: Bulgaria

Physical characteristics
- Source
  - location: Danubian Plain
  - coordinates: 43°22′31.08″N 23°57′38.16″E
  - elevation: 194 m (636 ft)
- Mouth
  - location: Iskar
  - coordinates: 43°33′24.12″N 24°16′53.04″E
  - elevation: 42 m (138 ft)
- Length: 41 km (25 mi)
- Basin size: 320 km^{2} (120 sq mi)

Basin features
- Progression: Iskar→ Danube→ Black Sea

The Gostilya (Bulgarian: Гостиля) is a 41 km-long river in northern Bulgaria, a left tributary of the river Iskar.

The river takes its source in the Danubian Plain at an altitude of 194 m, some 1.4 km east of the village of Vranyak. Until the town of Knezha the river flows in northeastern direction and then turns eastwards until its mouth, flowing in an asymmetric valley with steeper right bank. It flows into the Iskar at an altitude of 42 m about 1.1 km south of the village of Stavertsi. The Gostilya is the last tributary of the Iskar before the latter's confluence with the Danube.

Its drainage basin covers a territory of 320 km^{2} or 3.7% of Iskar's total.

The Gostilya has rain-snow feed and usually dries up in the end of summer. The average annual discharge at its mouth is 0.64 m^{3}/s.

The river flows in Vratsa and Pleven Provinces. There are three settlements along its course: the village of Tarnak in Byala Slatina Municipality of Vratsa Province, the town of Knezha in the homonymous municipality and the village of Gostilya in Dolna Mitropoliya Municipality, the latter two in Pleven Province. Along its left sloping bank runs a 19.4 km stretch of the third class III-137 road Knezha–Stavertsi–Krushovene.
