= Slaveyko Arsov =

Bulgarian revolutionary (1878–1904)

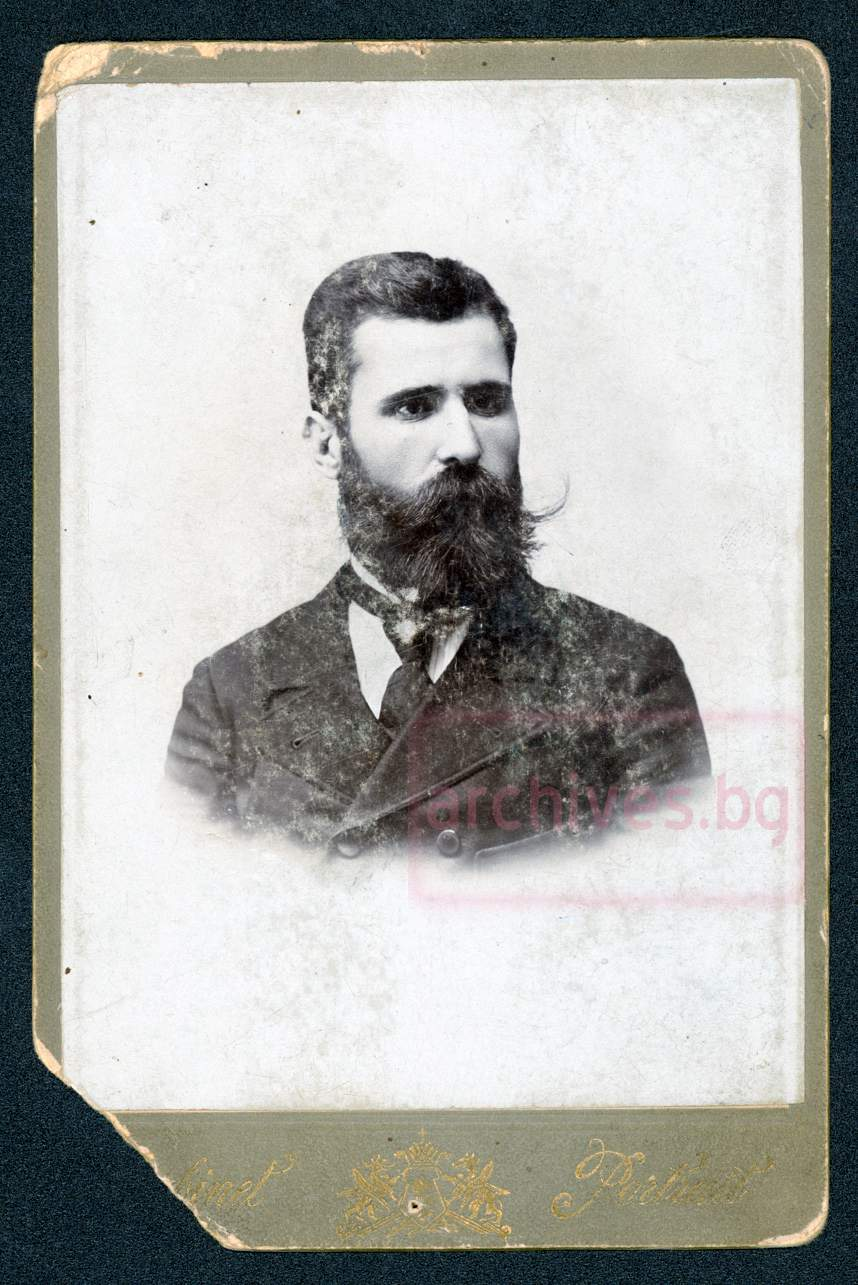
- A photograph of Slaveyko Arsov
- Born: 1877 or August 17, 1878; Novo Selo, Kosovo Vilayet, Ottoman Empire
- Died: July 9, 1904; Gorno Gyuganci, Ottoman Empire
- Organization: IMARO

Slaveyko Arsov Kikiritkov (Bulgarian: Славейко Арсов Кикиритков, Macedonian: Славеjко Арсов Кикиритков) was a Macedonian Bulgarian revolutionary and leader of the Internal Macedonian-Adrianople Revolutionary Organization (IMARO) for the region of Resen.

== Biography ==
Slaveyko Arsov was born in 1878 in the village of Novo Selo (now part of Štip Municipality in the Republic of North Macedonia), then part of the Kosovo Vilayet of the Ottoman Empire. He finished his elementary education in his village. He studied in Skopje, and later, during 1897–1898, in Sofia. His older brother Mihail became a member of the Štip committee of the revolutionary organization IMARO at the time when Dame Gruev and Gotse Delchev were its leaders and worked as teachers in Štip but he died in 1895 after being wounded accidentally during revolver practice. Arsov joined IMARO in 1896. At the end of 1899, Arsov settled in Kičevo, where he developed revolutionary activity. He spent one year in prison, and in 1901 he became a member of Marko Lerinski's revolutionary band. With Lerinski and Delchev, he toured the regions of Kastoria, Edessa, Florina and Bitola. After participating in Lerinski's band, he became the leader of his own band in Resen.

Together with Captain Toma Davidov, he participated in the activities of the inspection band. In February 1902, Arsov became a member of an independent revolutionary band in the region of Bitola, and in the summer of the same year, in the region of Resen. In Resen, he and Nikola Kokarev,^{(bg)} created the first committees of the organization. At the Congress of Smilevo, he was a delegate of the Resen revolutionary region, together with Aleksandar Panayotov, Velyan Iliev and Nikola Kokarev. Before the Ilinden-Preobrazhenie Uprising, Toma Nikolov and Donka Ushlinova joined his band. He participated in the Ilinden-Preobrazhenie Uprising, after which he moved to Bulgaria.

In 1904, he returned to Ottoman Macedonia, together with the revolutionary bands led by Atanas Babata and Stoyan Donski. On June 9, 1904, they were betrayed by local Serbomans near the village of Gorno Gyugyantsi, Kratovo region, and were surrounded by Turkish military. After 6 hours of battle, the revolutionaries began to withdraw. The leader Stoyan Donski and 20 revolutionaries were killed. Arsov, who was injured, took his own life. He is regarded as an ethnic Macedonian in North Macedonia.

== Gallery ==
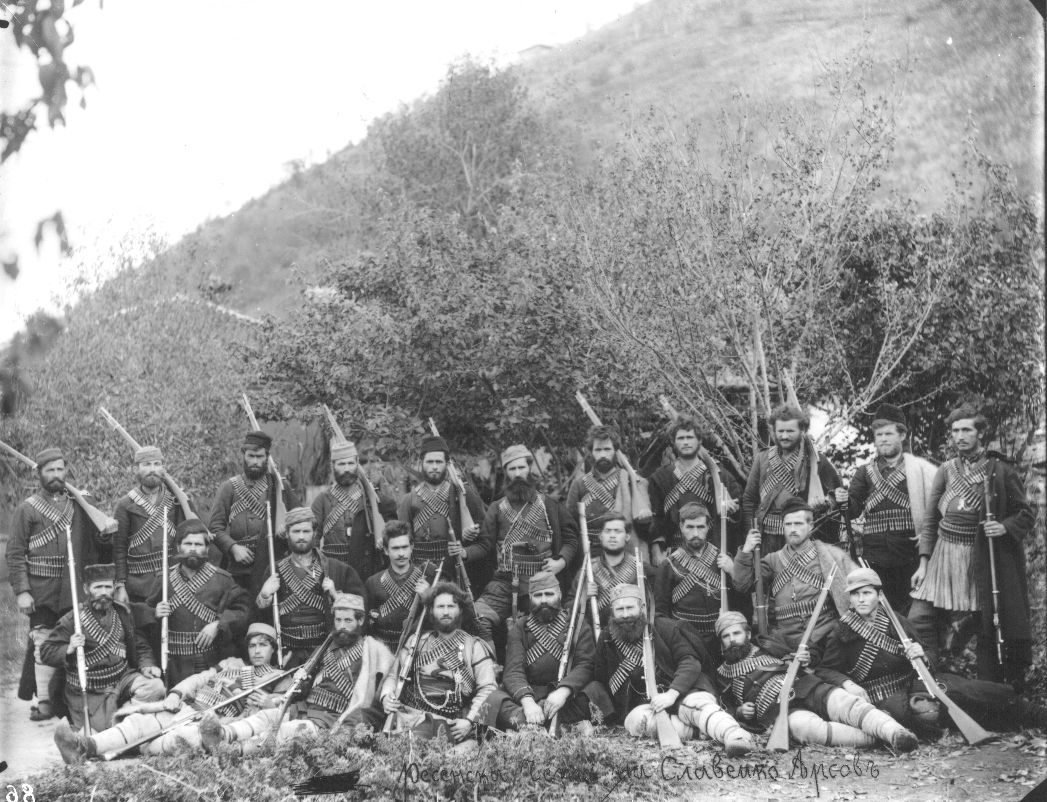
The revolutionary band of Slaveyko Arsov

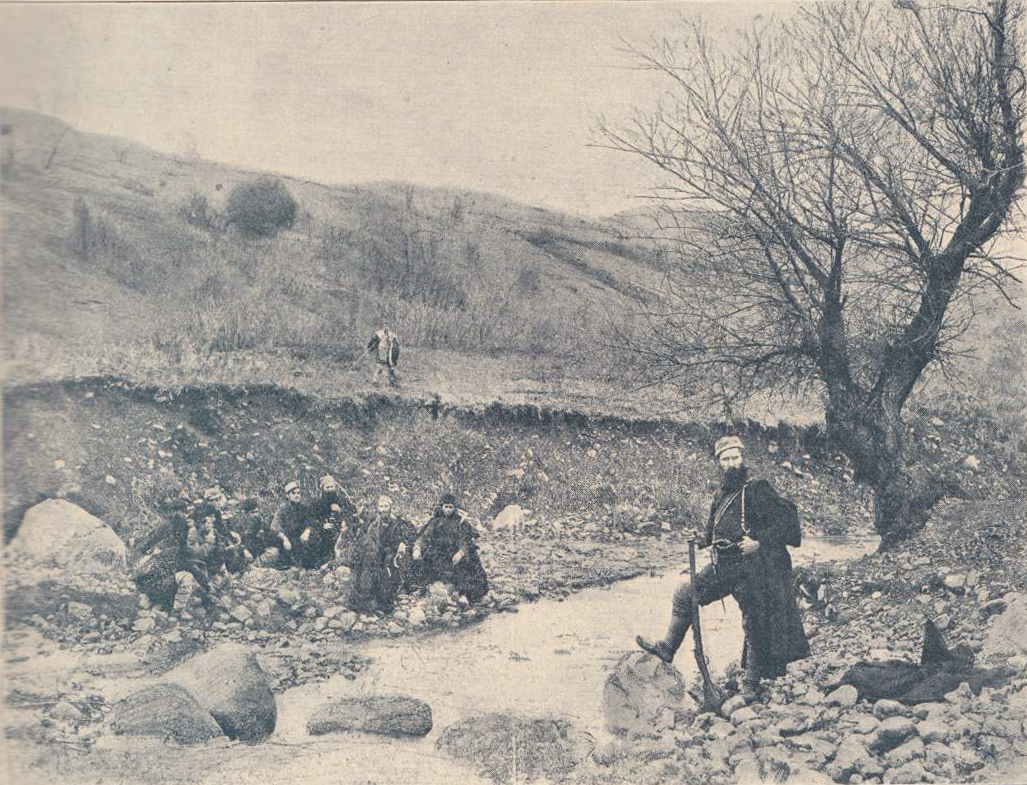
The revolutionary band of Slaveyko Arsov

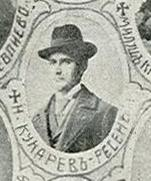
Nikola Kokarev
