= Zilva Peaks =

Peaks in Graham Land, Antarctica

Zilva Peaks (66°45′S 65°23′W) is a pair of conspicuous peaks between the two arms of Drummond Glacier in Graham Land. Photographed by Hunting Aerosurveys Ltd. in 1955-57 and mapped from these photos by the Falkland Islands Dependencies Survey (FIDS). Named by the United Kingdom Antarctic Place-Names Committee (UK-APC) for S.S. Zilva of the Lister Institute of Preventive Medicine, London, one of the principal investigators in the work which led to the production of synthetic vitamin C. He helped in the calculation of the sledging rations of many British polar expeditions between World War I and II.
