= Lampitt Nunatak =

Nunatak in Graham Land, Antarctica

Lampitt Nunatak (66°57′S 65°47′W) is a nunatak near the head of Murphy Glacier, in Graham Land, Antarctica. It was photographed by Hunting Aerosurveys Ltd in 1955–57, and mapped from these photos by the Falkland Islands Dependencies Survey. It was named by the UK Antarctic Place-Names Committee in 1958 for Leslie H. Lampitt (1887–1957), a chemist who contributed many ideas for concentrated rations used by British polar expeditions during the period 1937–57.
