= Lera, Bitola =

Lera Лера Lerë
- Village
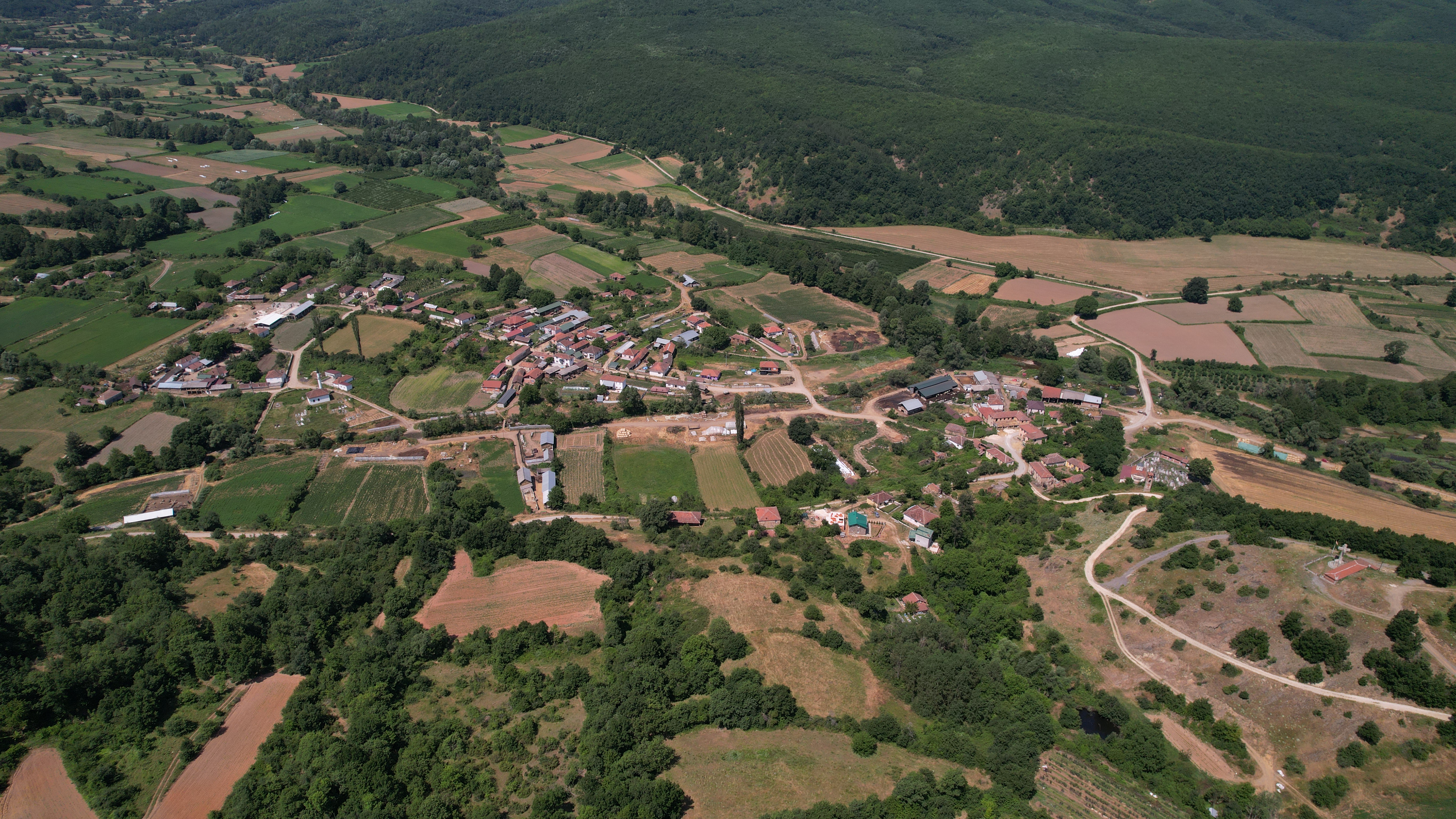
- Air view of the village

- Location within North Macedonia
- Coordinates: 41°06′N 21°10′E
- Country: North Macedonia
- Region: Pelagonia
- Municipality: Bitola

Population (2002)
  - Total: 122
- Time zone: UTC+1 (CET)
  - Summer (DST): UTC+2 (CEST)
- Car plates: BT
- Website: .

Lera (Macedonian: Лера, Albanian: Lerë) is a village in the municipality of Bitola, North Macedonia. It used to be part of the former municipality of Capari.

== Demographics ==
The Albanian population of Lera are Tosks, a subgroup of southern Albanians.

According to the 2002 census, the village had a total of 122 inhabitants. Ethnic groups in the village include:

- Albanians 85
- Macedonians 36
- Others 3
