= Tlachene Cove =

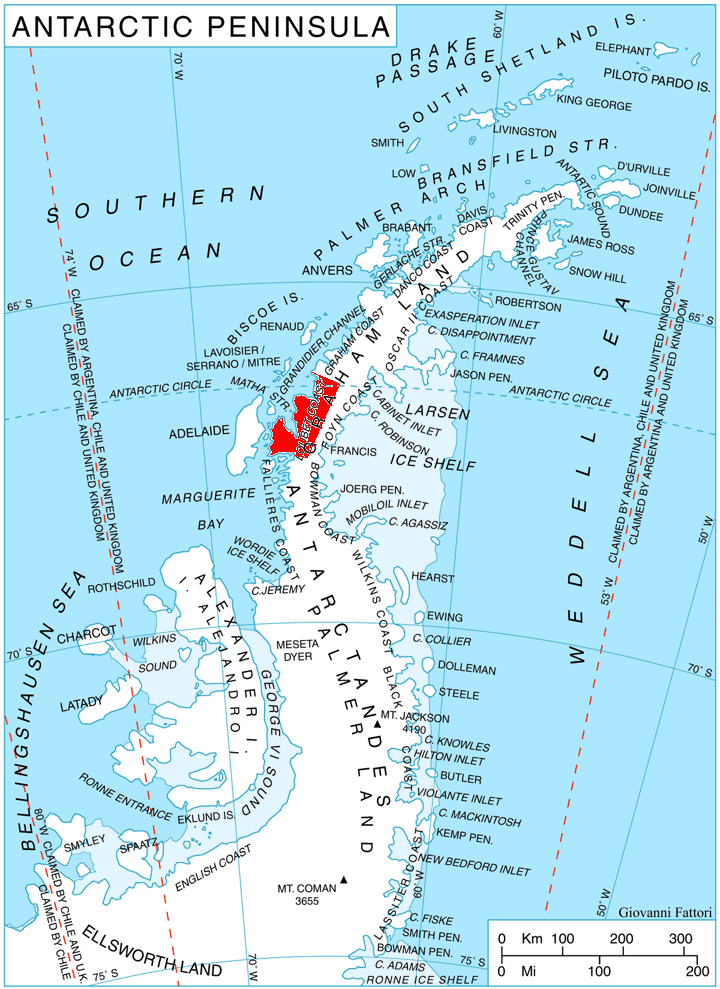
Location of Loubet Coast on the Antarctic Peninsula.

Tlachene Cove (Bulgarian: залив Тлачене, ‘Zaliv Tlachene’ \'za-liv 'tla-che-ne\) is the 4 km wide cove indenting for 3.6 km Loubet Coast on the Antarctic Peninsula. It is part of Darbel Bay, entered southwest of Kudelin Point and northeast of Gostilya Point. The cove was formed as a result of the retreat of Hopkins Glacier during the last two decades of the 20th century.

The feature is named after the settlement of Tlachene in Northwestern Bulgaria.

== Location ==
Gostilya Point is located at 66°35′40″S 65°42′50″W. British mapping in 1976.

== Maps ==
- British Antarctic Territory. Scale 1:200000 topographic map. DOS 610 Series, Sheet W 66 64. Directorate of Overseas Surveys, Tolworth, UK, 1976.
- Antarctic Digital Database (ADD). Scale 1:250000 topographic map of Antarctica. Scientific Committee on Antarctic Research (SCAR). Since 1993, regularly upgraded and updated.
