= Widdowson Glacier =

Glacier in Graham Land, Antarctica

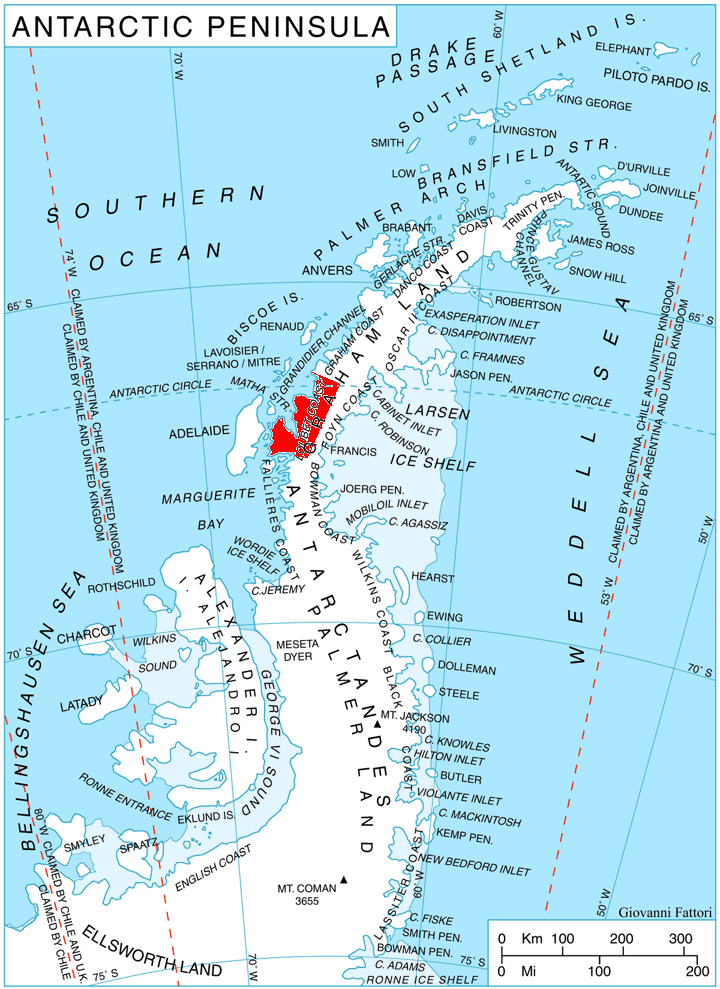
Location of Loubet Coast on the Antarctic Peninsula.

Widdowson Glacier (66°43′S 65°46′W) is a glacier situated between Drummond and McCance Glaciers and flowing into Darbel Bay south of Sokol Point, on the west coast of Graham Land.

The glacier was photographed by Hunting Aerosurveys Ltd. in 1955–57, and mapped from these photos by the Falkland Islands Dependencies Survey (FIDS). Named by the United Kingdom Antarctic Place-Names Committee (UK-APC) for Elsie M. Widdowson of the Dept. of Experimental Medicine, Cambridge, joint author of The Chemical Composition of Foods, a fundamental work containing all the quantitative data required for calculating expedition ration requirements other than vitamins.
