= Hutchison Hill =

Hutchison Hill (66°56′S 65°42′W) is a hill 1.5 nautical miles (3 km) northeast of Lampitt Nunatak on Avery Plateau, Graham Land, Antarctica. This hill is one of the few features on the plateau that is readily visible from Darbel Bay. It was named by the UK Antarctic Place-Names Committee in 1960 for Sir Robert Hutchison, a Scottish physician who made contributions to knowledge of the scientific principles of nutrition.
