= Phantom Point =

Point in Darbel Bay, Antarctic Peninsula

Phantom Point (66°25′S 65°41′W) is a point within Darbel Bay, lying 1.5 nautical miles (2.8 km) west of Shanty Point on the west coast of Graham Land. Photographed by Hunting Aerosurveys Ltd. in 1955–57, and mapped from these photos by the Falkland Islands Dependencies Survey (FIDS). The name arose because the position of the point was only vaguely known when first visited by an FIDS sledge party in 1957, and it was obscured by thick fog from which it finally loomed like a phantom.
