= Gostilya, Pleven Province =

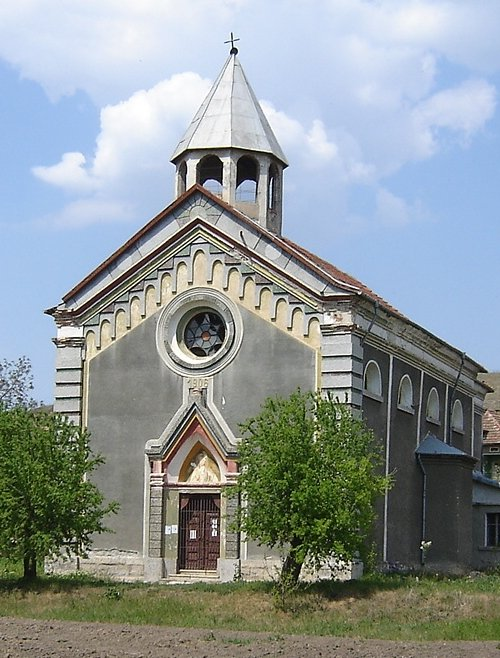
Roman Catholic church in Gostilya, Pleven Province, Bulgaria

Gostilya (Bulgarian: Гостиля; also transliterated Gostilja) is a village in central northern Bulgaria, located in Dolna Mitropoliya municipality, Pleven Province. It was founded in 1890 by 133 families of Roman Catholic Banat Bulgarians from Stár Bišnov (Dudeștii Vechi) and Ivanovo in what was then Austria-Hungary. It was later also settled by Banat Swabians (see Germans in Bulgaria), Eastern Orthodox Bulgarians and Aromanians from Macedonia, as well as Banat Bulgarians from other villages. A school was built in 1893, the Roman Catholic church was opened in 1904 and the local community centre (chitalishte) was founded in 1926. Gostilya was once the poorest of the Banat Bulgarian villages in Bulgaria because it had a limited common. In 1939, the local Roman Catholic community numbered 1,091. 33 Banat Swabians left Gostilya in 1943 due to Nazi Germany's Heim ins Reich policy.

As of 2008, Gostilya has a population of 289 and the mayor is Mariana Romanova. The village lies at 43°34′N 24°14′E, 51 metres above mean sea level.

== Gallery ==
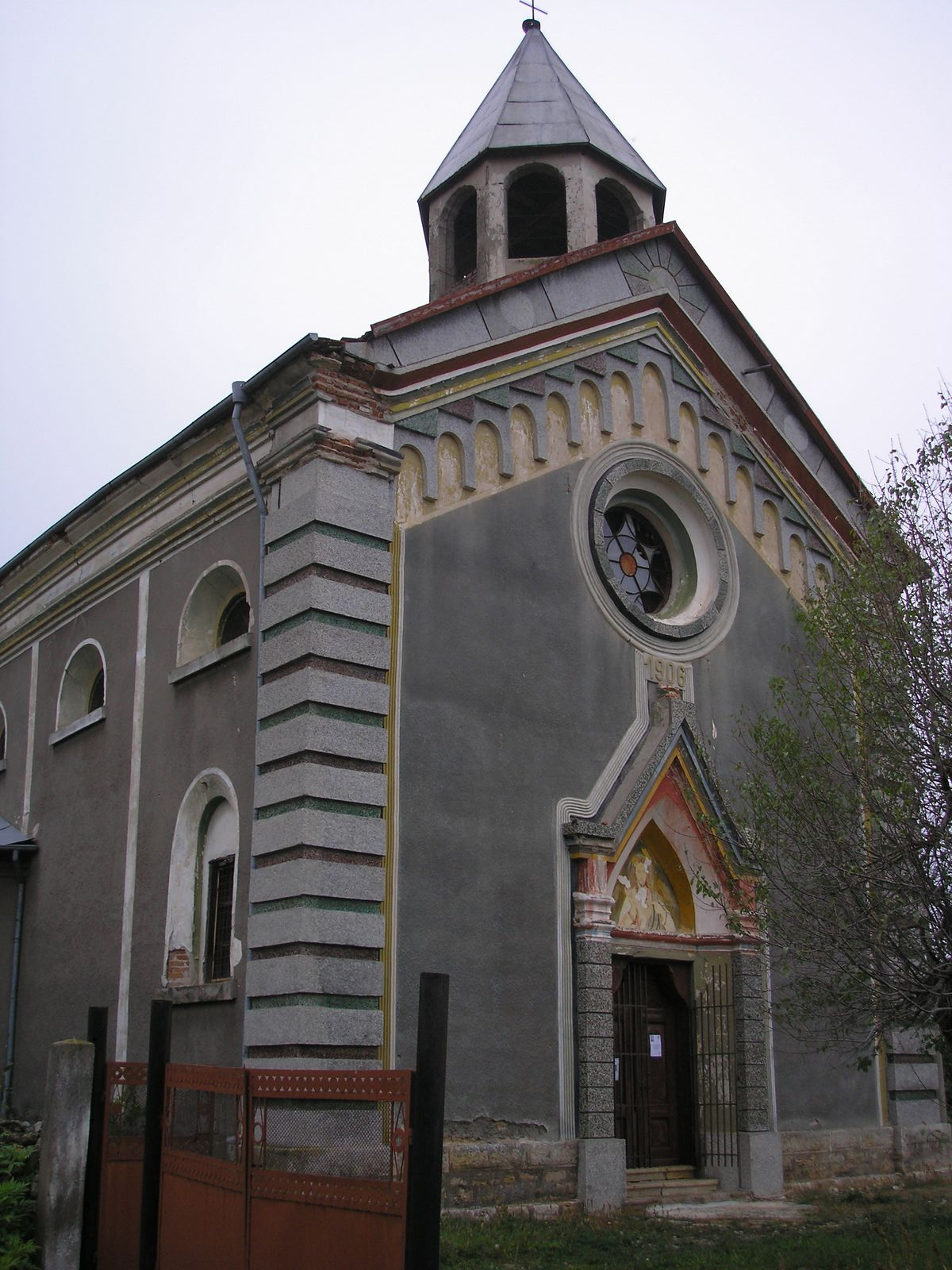
Church of the Sacred Heart of Jesus (1904)

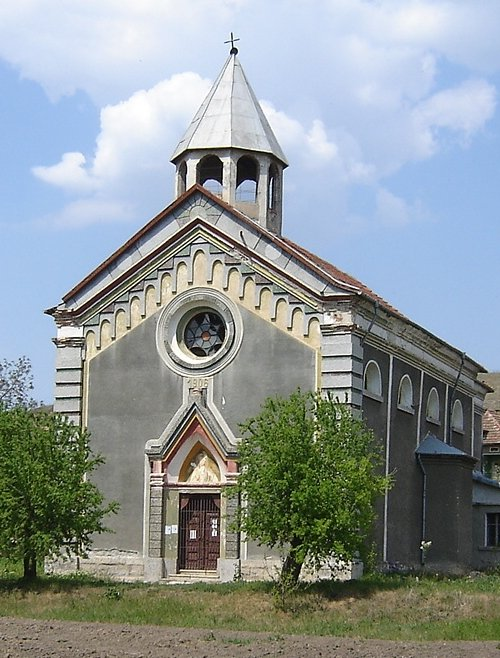
Church of the Sacred Heart of Jesus (1904)

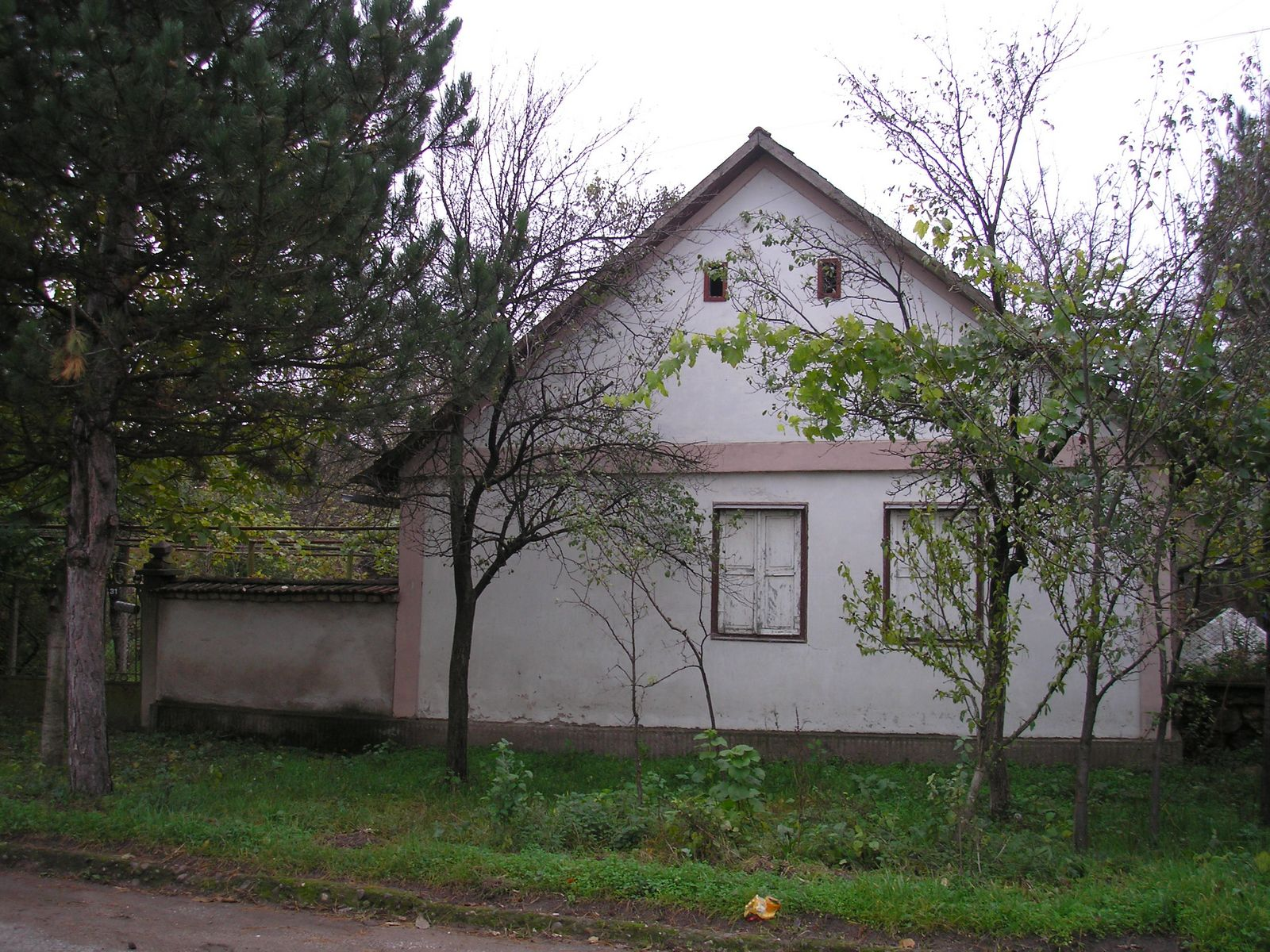
Traditional Banat Bulgarian house

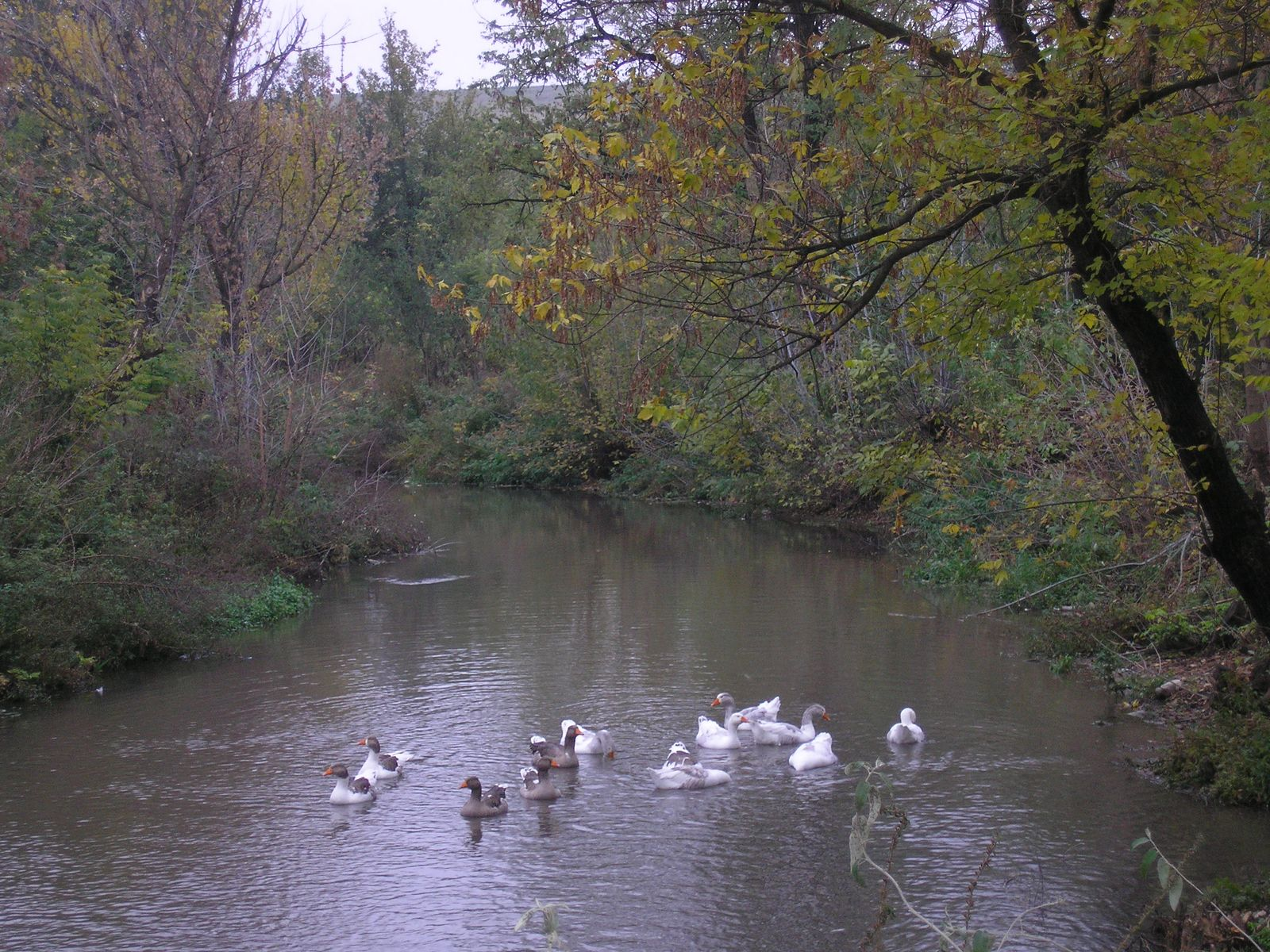
Geese are popularly bred by the Banat Bulgarians as they provide down for pillows and blankets

== Honours ==
Gostilya Point in Antarctica is named after Gostilya.
