= Georgi Sugarev =

Bulgarian revolutionary

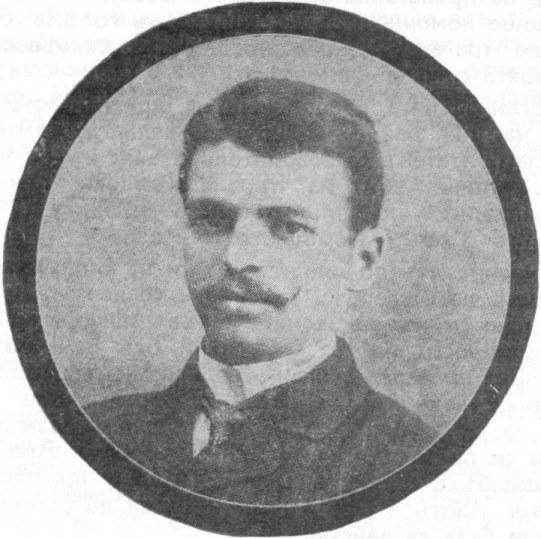
Georgi Sugarev

Georgi Kostov Sugarev (Bulgarian: Георги Костов Сугарев) was a Bulgarian teacher and revolutionary, vojvoda of the Internal Macedonian-Adrianople Revolutionary Organization. In North Macedonia, Sugarev is part of the country's historical heritage as an ethnic Macedonian.

== Biography ==
Sugarev was born in 1876 in Bitola, then in the Ottoman Empire, today in North Macedonia. His family was very poor and his mother together with his brothers Hristo, Mihail and Vangel emigrated to the United States and actively participate in the activities of the Macedonian Patriotic Organization. Vangel became there a historian and author of several books as "The Bulgarian nationality of the Macedonians" and "The constitution of the Bulgarian Revolutionary Central Committee".

Sugarev completed fourth grade of Bulgarian Men's High School of Bitola. Afterwards he became a Bulgarian teacher, initially in Demir Hisar, then in Kichevo, and finally in Bitola. However, he left the school system and decided to join the Internal Macedonian Revolutionary Organisation. In 1901 he became a chetnik of Nikola Rusinski. With the assistance of the vojvoda Rusinski, they operated together through the regions of Demir Hisar, Smilevo and Bitola. The same year he was elected a member of the Bitola District Revolutionary Committee of the IMRO, and in February 1902 he went underground. Sugarev was a delegate to the Smilevo Congress of the Bitola revolutionary district of IMRO. At the beginning of the Ilinden uprising, he was Bitola revolutionary district leader, participating in several battles. Together with the vojvodas Hristo Uzunov he supported Dame Gruev to restore the organization after the suppression of the uprising. After the defeat of the Ilinden Uprising in the winter of 1904, he settled briefly in Bulgaria. Later Sugarev participate in the Prilep Congress of the IMRO in 1904. He started also anti-Serb campaign in the late summer of 1905. These actions he coordinated with the IMRO leaders Pancho Konstantinov and Ivan Naumov Alyabaka. Later Sugarev left for Bitola to arrange joint actions against the pro-Serbian bands in the Bitola and Skopje revolutionary districts. By this activity, Sugarev was helped by the Bulgarian vojvodas Petar Yurukov and Petar Radev Pashata.

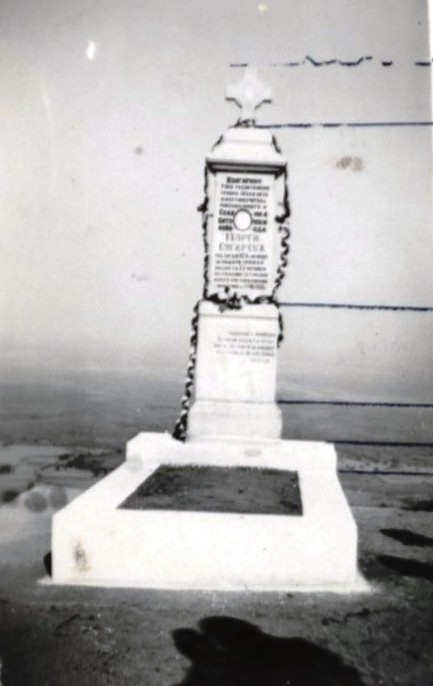
The tombstone of Sugarev, that after WWII was destroyed by the Yugoslav communist authorities.

In March 1906 Sugarev traveled to Mariovo to counter the intensifying Greek bands. Because of betrayal, of March 23, 1906, the cheta was surrounded near the village of Paralevo, in today Novaci Municipality, of numerous Turkish forces and after a fierce battle was completely destroyed.

During the Second World War, when the area was under Bulgarian administration, the authorities built a tombstone of Sugarev on his place of a skull, which after the war was destroyed by the Yugoslav administration.

== Sources ==
- "Илюстрация Илинден", година ІІ, брой 1,стр 11-15
- Революционни борби въ Азоть (Велешко) и Порѣчието, глава Х, Ст. Аврамовъ
