= Madell Point =

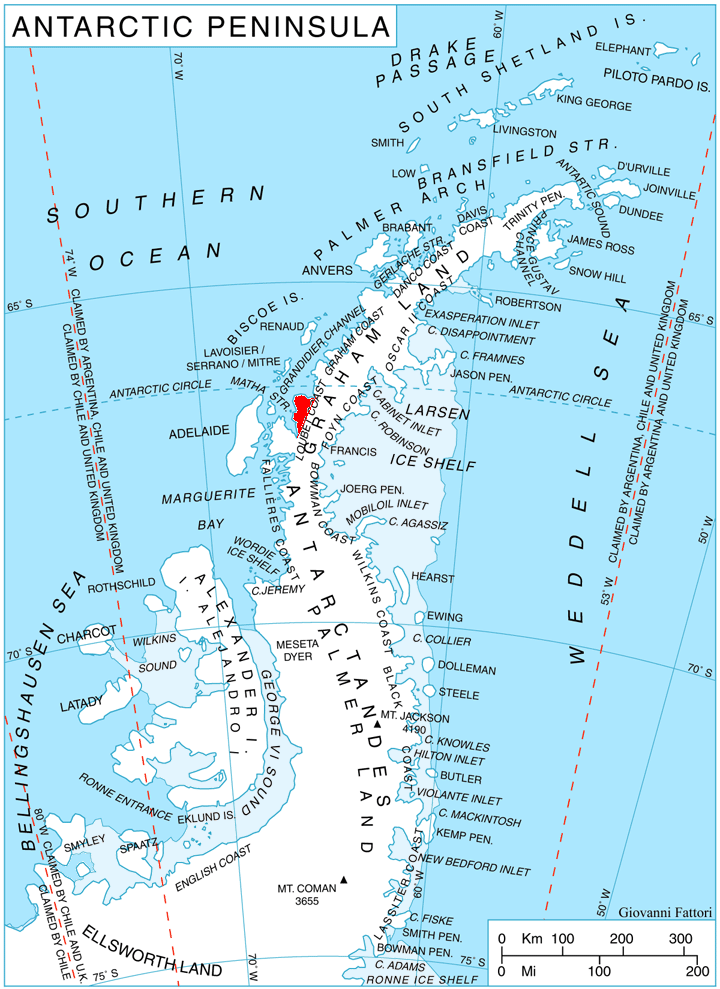
Location of Pernik Peninsula on Loubet Coast, Antarctic Peninsula.

Madell Point (66°35′S 66°22′W) is a point 2 nautical miles (4 km) northeast of Cape Rey on the northwest coast of Pernik Peninsula, on the Loubet Coast of Graham Land, Antarctica. It was mapped from air photos taken by the Falkland Islands and Dependencies Aerial Survey Expedition (1956–57), and was named for James S. Madell, a Falkland Islands Dependencies Survey surveyor at Detaille Island in 1957, who was responsible for the triangulation of this area.
