= Voit Peak =

Mountain in Antarctica

Voit Peak (66°40′S 65°35′W) is a peak between Drummond and Hopkins Glaciers on the west coast of Graham Land. Photographed by the Falkland Islands and Dependencies Aerial Survey Expedition (FIDASE) in 1956–57. Named by the United Kingdom Antarctic Place-Names Committee (UK-APC) in 1960 for Carl von Voit (1831–1908), German physiologist, pioneer of basic metabolic studies who published what was probably the first standard of human calorie requirements in 1881.
