= Hopkins Glacier =

Glacier in Antarctica

Coordinates: 66°36′S 65°42′W

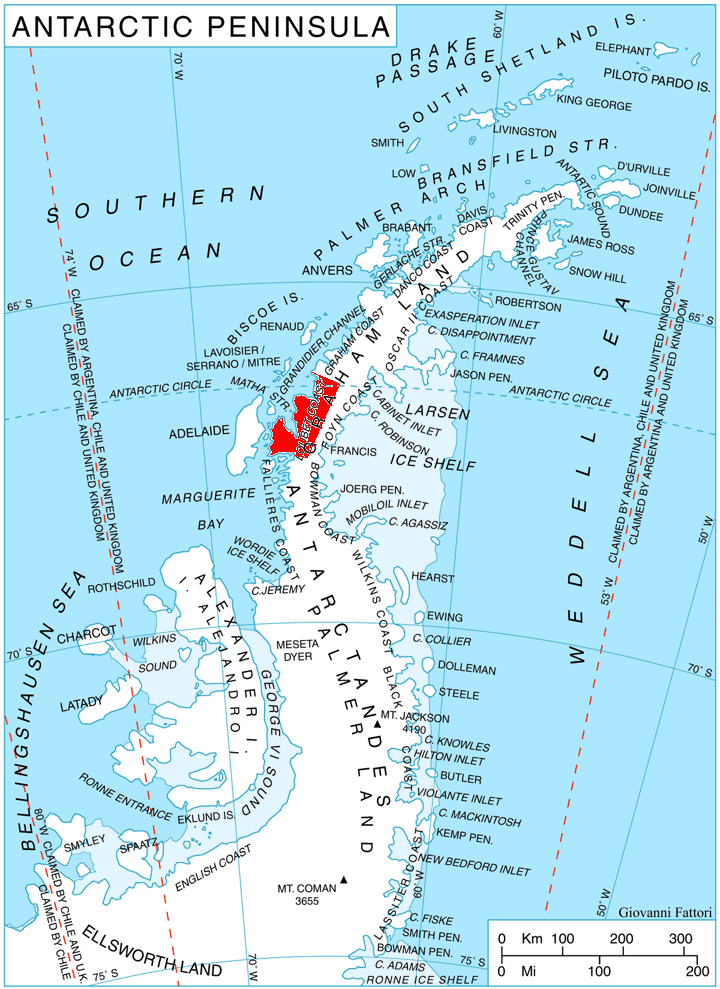
Location of Loubet Coast on the Antarctic Peninsula.

Hopkins Glacier is a glacier situated south of Erskine Glacier and flowing westwards into the head of Tlachene Cove in Darbel Bay on the west coast of Graham Land, Antarctica. It was photographed by Hunting Aerosurveys Ltd in 1955–57, and mapped from these photos by the Falkland Islands Dependencies Survey. It was named by the UK Antarctic Place-Names Committee in 1958 for Sir Frederick Hopkins, founder of the School of Biochemistry at the University of Cambridge, who made pioneer investigations on synthetic diets and vitamins which contributed greatly to the development of present ideas on concentrated rations.
