= Rubner Peak =

Mountain in Antarctica

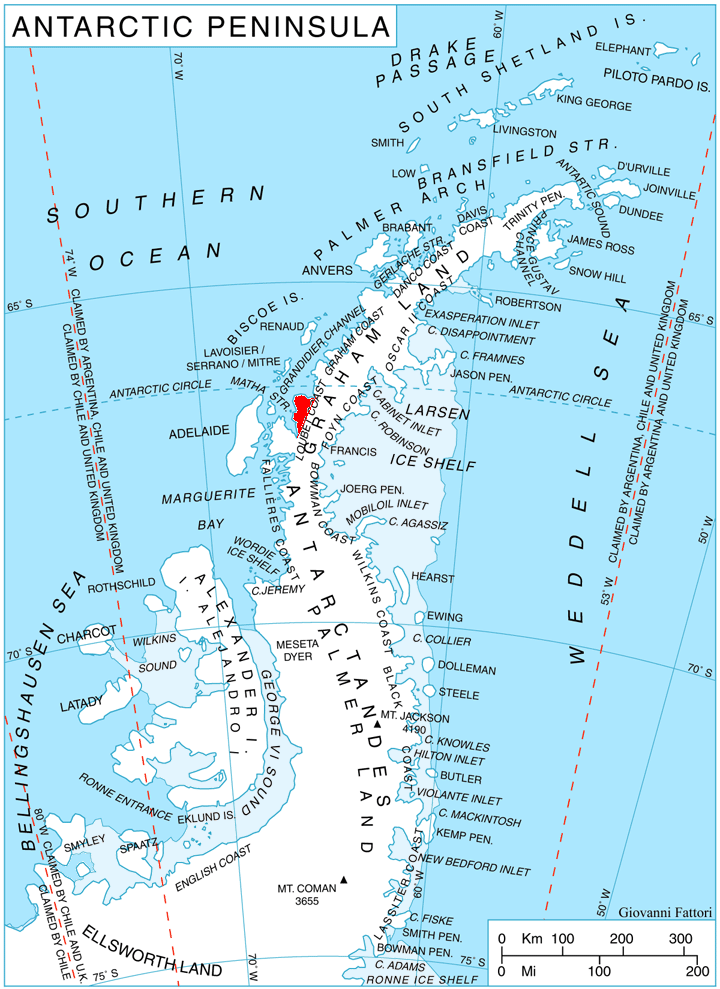
Location of Pernik Peninsula on Loubet Coast, Antarctic Peninsula.

Rubner Peak (66°44′S 65°51′W) is the highest point on the sharp ridge separating McCance and Widdowson Glaciers, just south of Darbel Bay on the northeast coast of Pernik Peninsula, Loubet Coast in Graham Land. Photographed by the Falkland Islands and Dependencies Aerial Survey Expedition (FIDASE) in 1956–57. Named by the United Kingdom Antarctic Place-Names Committee (UK-APC) in 1960 for Max Rubner (1854–1932), German physiologist who made outstanding researches on human calorie requirements and the calorie value of foods.
