= Vishovgrad =

Vishovgrad Вишовград
- Village
- Location within Bulgaria
- Coordinates: 43°09′25″N 25°18′00″E
- Country: Bulgaria
- Province: Veliko Tarnovo
- Community: Pavlikeni

Government
  - Mayor: Emanuil Manolov

Area
  - Total: 42,436 km^{2} (16,385 sq mi)
- Elevation: 246 m (807 ft)

Population (2010)
  - Total: 430
  - Density: 0.010/km^{2} (0.026/sq mi)
- Time zone: UTC+2 (EET)
  - Summer (DST): UTC+3 (EEST)
- Post code: 5239
- Area code: 061308

Vishovgrad is a village in the Veliko Tarnovo Province of northern Bulgaria.

== Geography ==
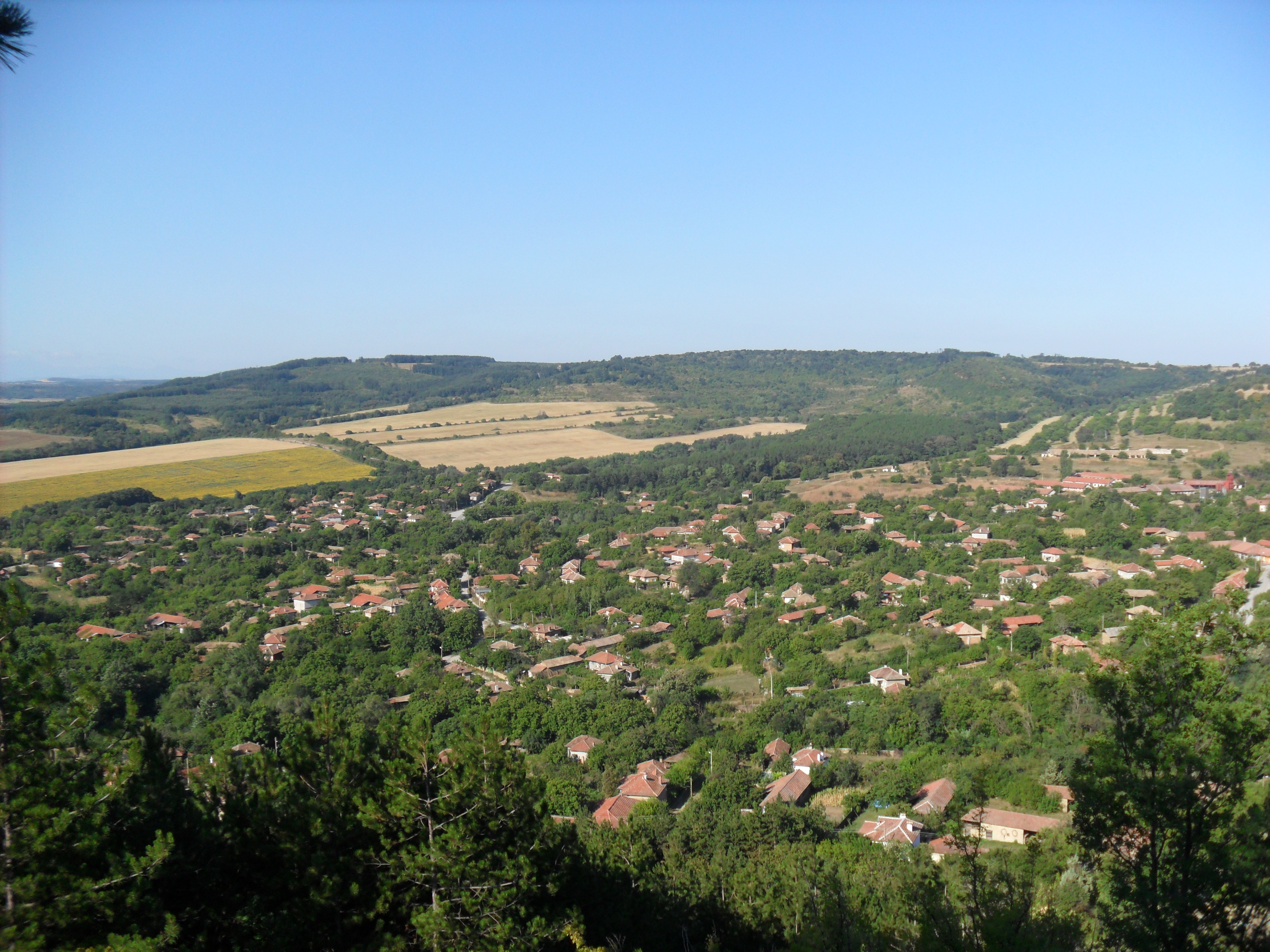
Panorama

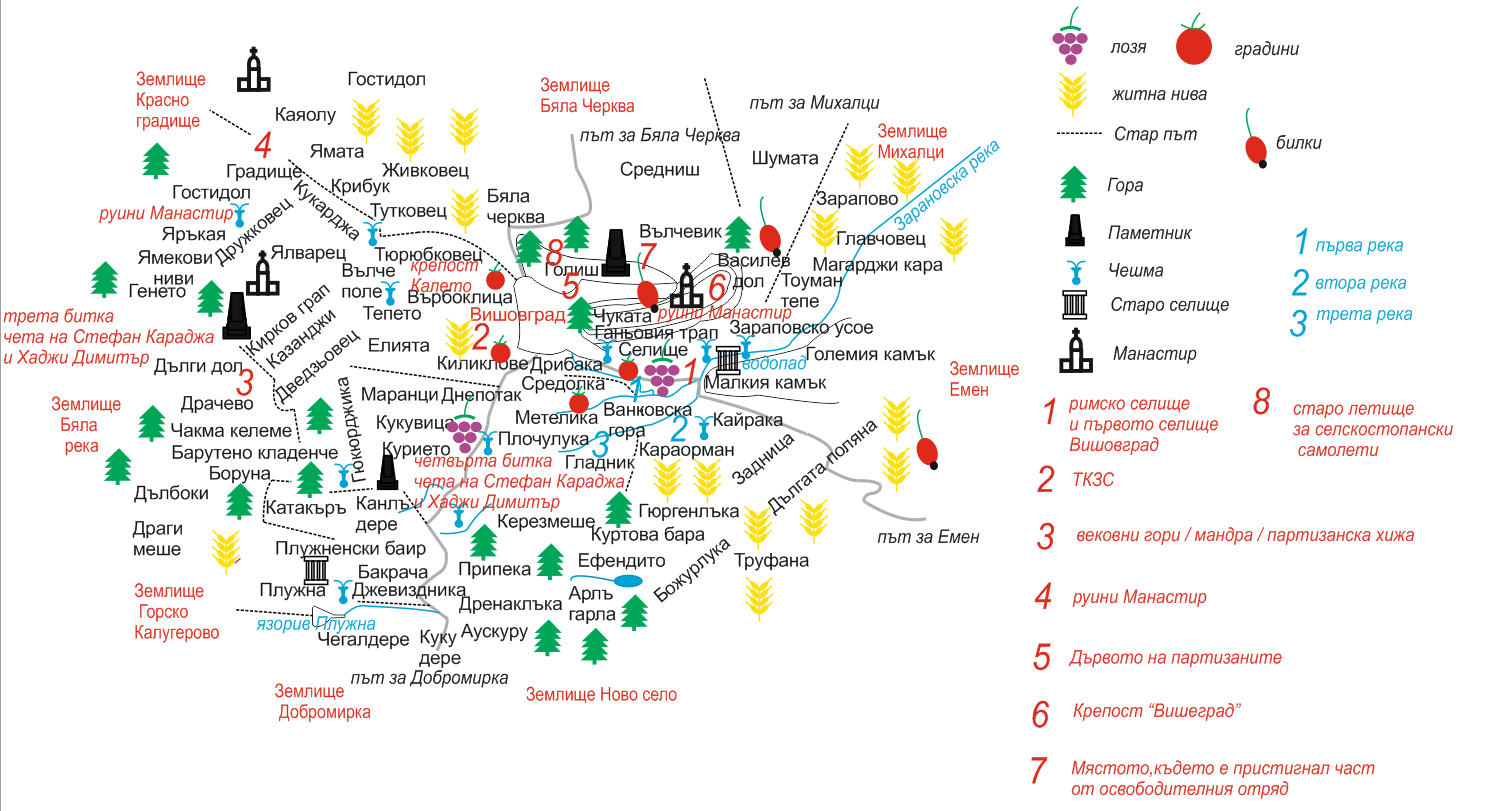
Map of the area around Vishovgrad

=== Location ===
Vishovgrad is located in the central Danubian Plain, near the Balkan Mountains (Stara Planina). It is 36 kilometres (22 mi) from Veliko Tarnovo, 10 kilometres (6.2 mi) from Pavlikeni, and 5 kilometres (3.1 mi) from Byala Cherkva.

=== Hydrography ===
The Vishovgrad Dam is located in the Plujna region. The Zarapovski Falls is in a park ("geo-complex") near Vishovgrad.

=== Soils ===
The land of Vishovgrad consists of 83% black soil and the rest is forest soil.

=== Topography ===
Vishovgrad is located between two hills, Chuckata and Golish, both of which can be seen from the village. The area of Vishovgrad is more extensive than those of other villages in Veliko Tarnovo.

== History ==
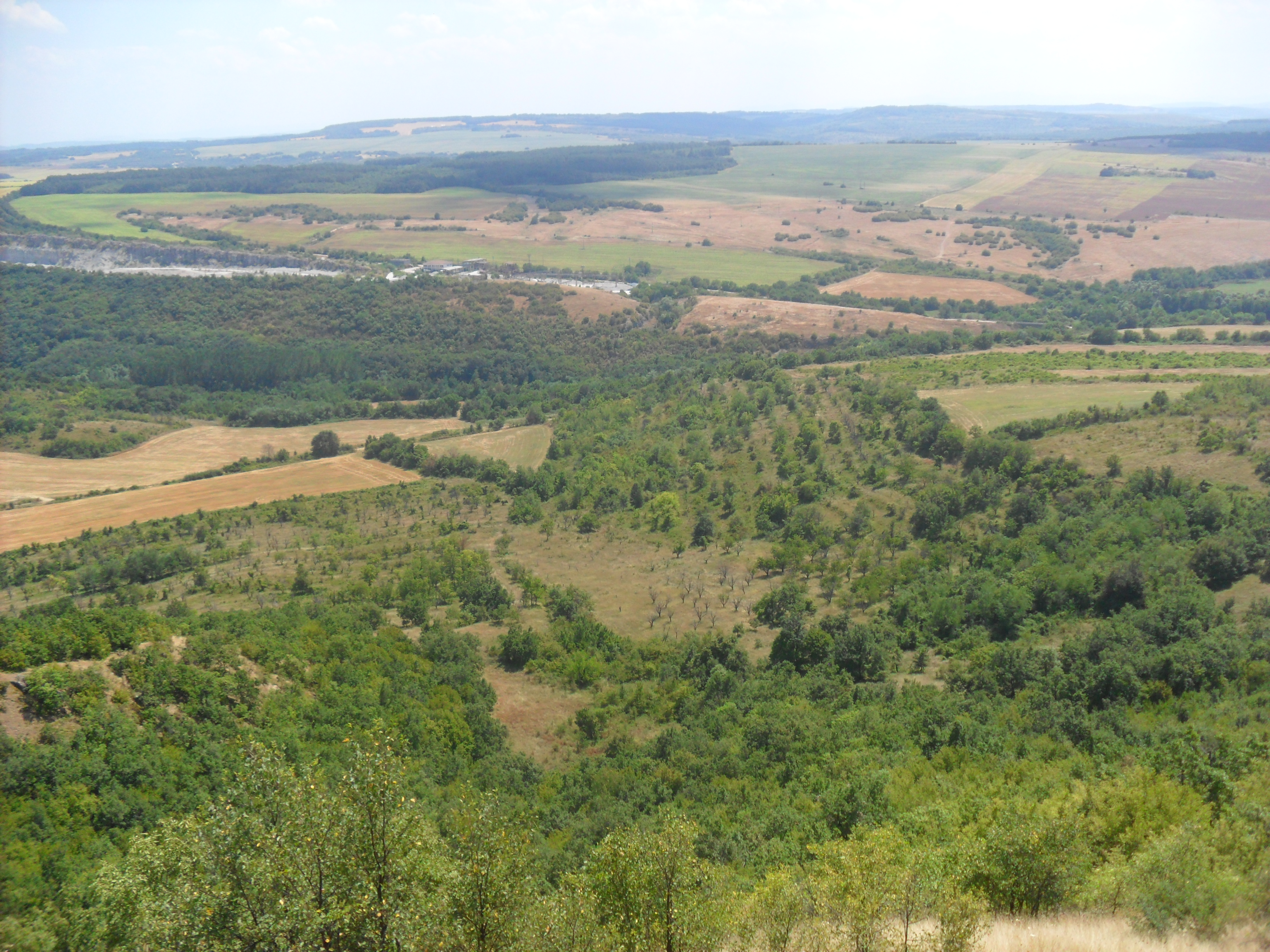
The Area Zarapovo

=== Antiquity ===
Vishovgrad has a long history. Scientists have discovered archaeological evidence that the first people inhabited this area more than 2,000 years ago. In the land of Vishovgrad due to favorable natural resources and its strategic importance are wiped traces of a Neolithic settlement, near the hill hammer.

=== Thracian times ===
In the "Zarapovo" area in 1st-3rd century had Thracian villaget. Source for this reference are the founded Thracian ceramics in the 20th century.

=== Roman times ===
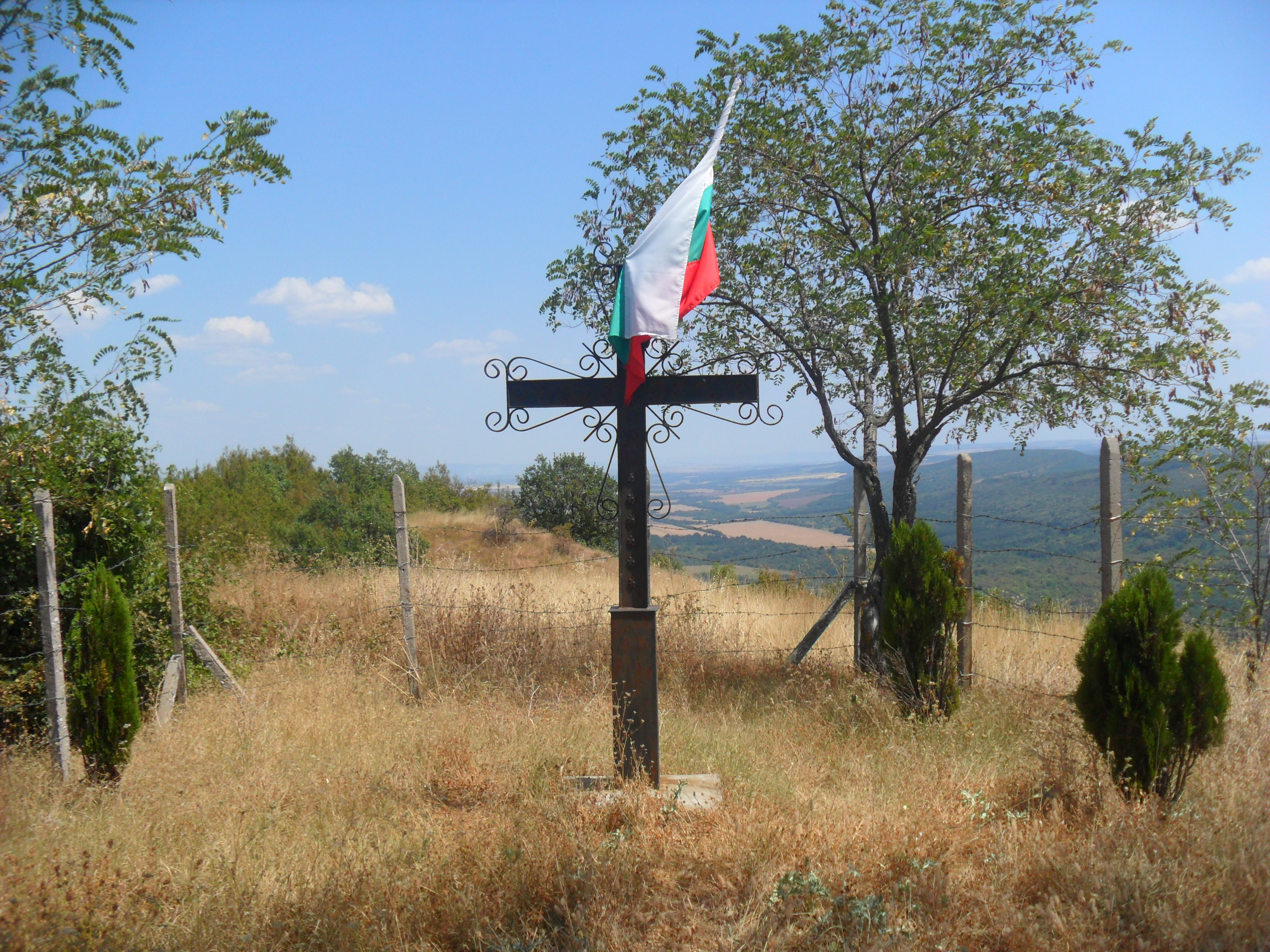
Ruins of Monastery Saint Visha and the Roman fortress

In the area of the settlement, there were two Roman villages. They were created after the conquest the Balkans from the Roman Empire . The first town were in the area "Zarapovo". The residents of the Roman settlement were farmers and warriors. After excavation were founded artifacts that show that in the Roman village had culture life too. There had four Roman strongholds in the area of Vishovgad.

=== Legends of occurrence ===
The first version for the occurrence of the village is that in the hill Chackata had a Monаstеry"Saint Visha". The monastery were named to a Greek woman Visha who were buried alive in the area Kalata in Chuckata. The second version is that the name came from Visok (a Bulgarian word for high) "Visok grad" "High town". The third version is that the name came from vishna (in English: morello) direct translator morello town. The Bulgarian village were founded on the ruins of the Roman village.

=== Ottoman rule ===
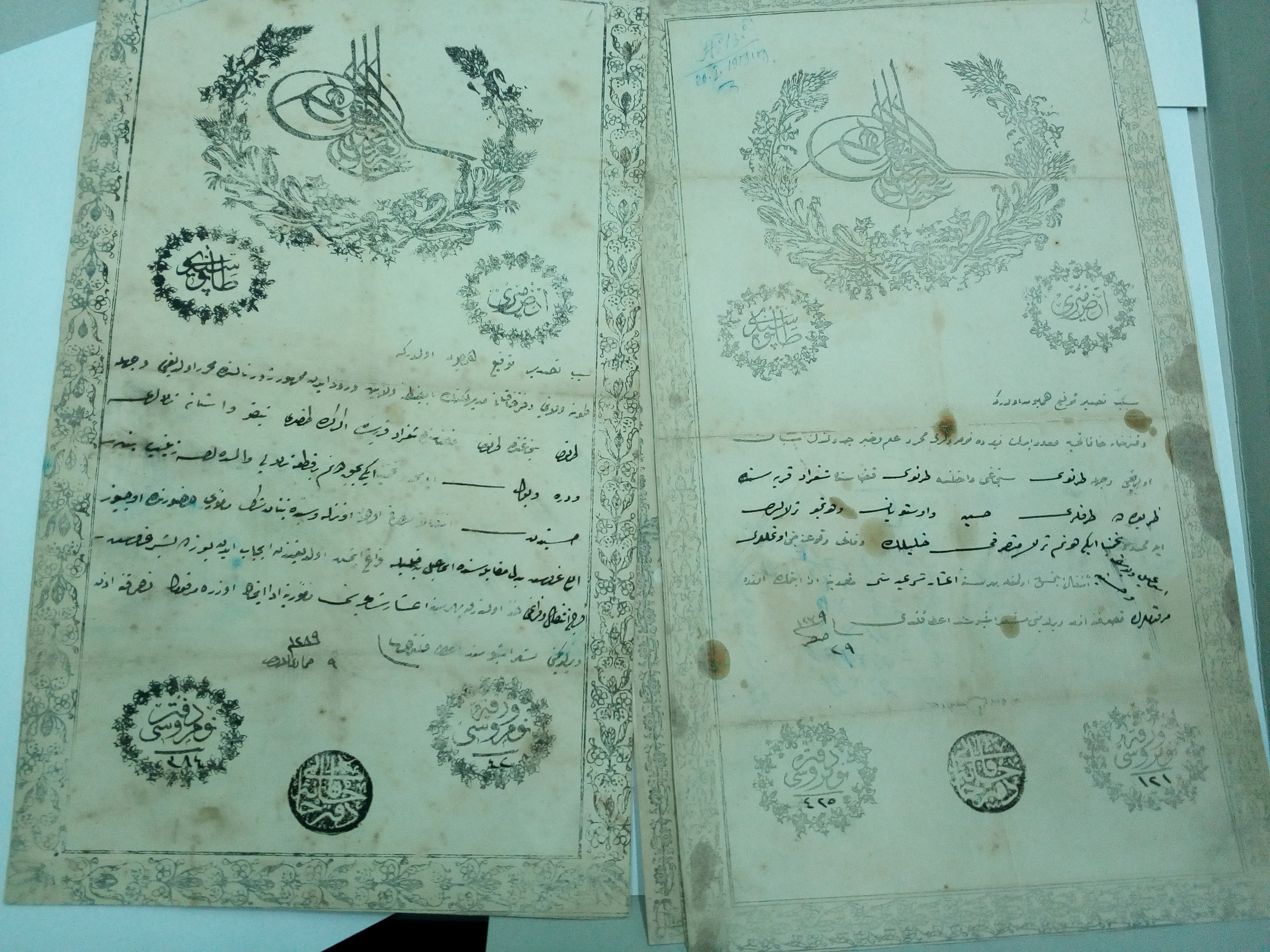
Ottoman property documents

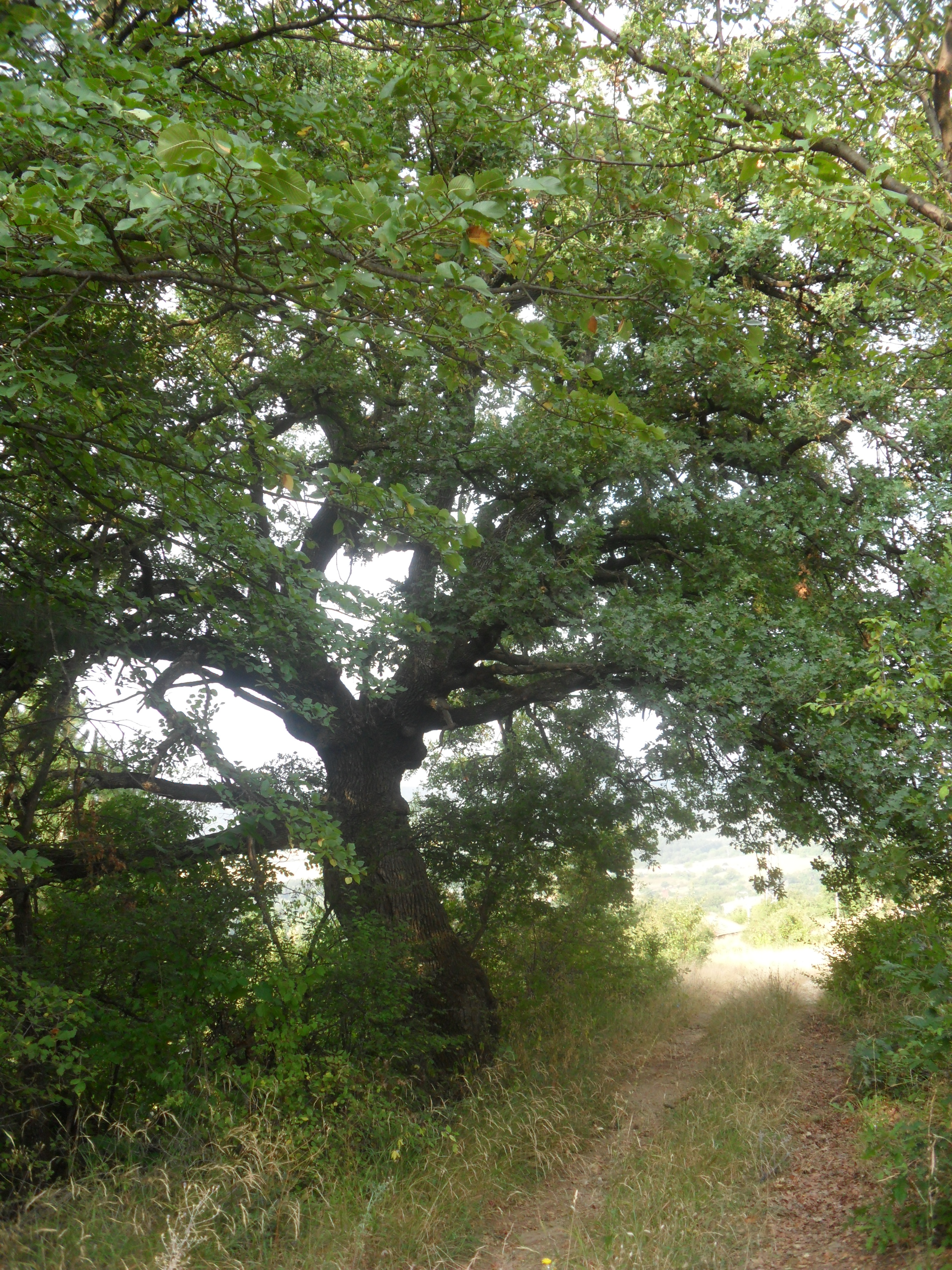
Tree of the partisans on hill Golish

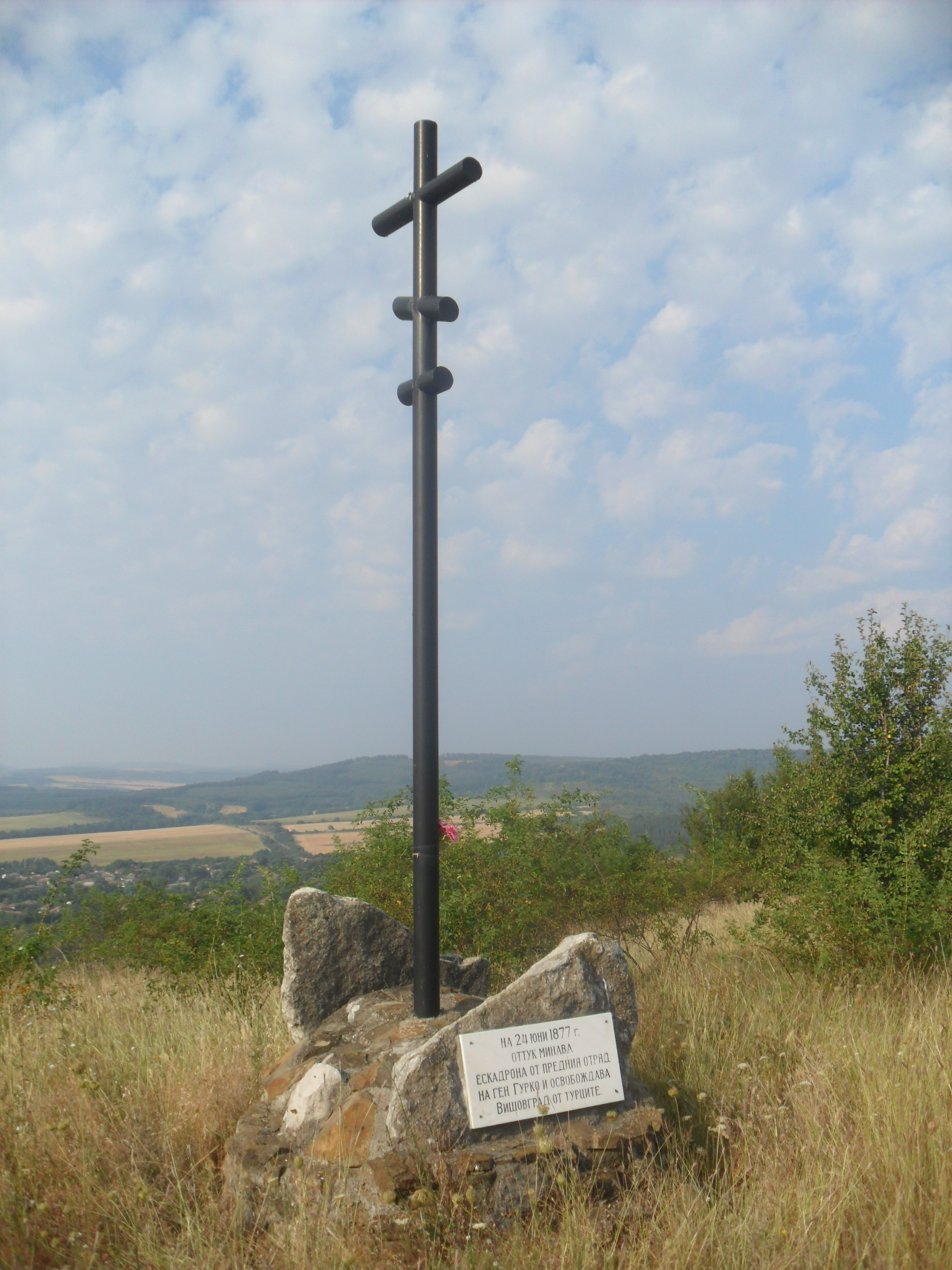
Monument of squadron of Vasily Gurko army,1877

The village was moved from "Selishte" to a place between the Golish and Chukata hills in the 15th century. In 1726 in Vishovgrad Mircho, a Bulgarian leader, was born. The plague in 1829 take the lives of many citizens of Vishovgrad.Kolyo Chorbadzhi were mayor between the years 1840 - 1860.

The fund "Selska lubov" (name in the Turkish registers) (Opened in 1866) was to the Church in the village, but the funds were collected for the revolutionary committee in the village of priests and people.

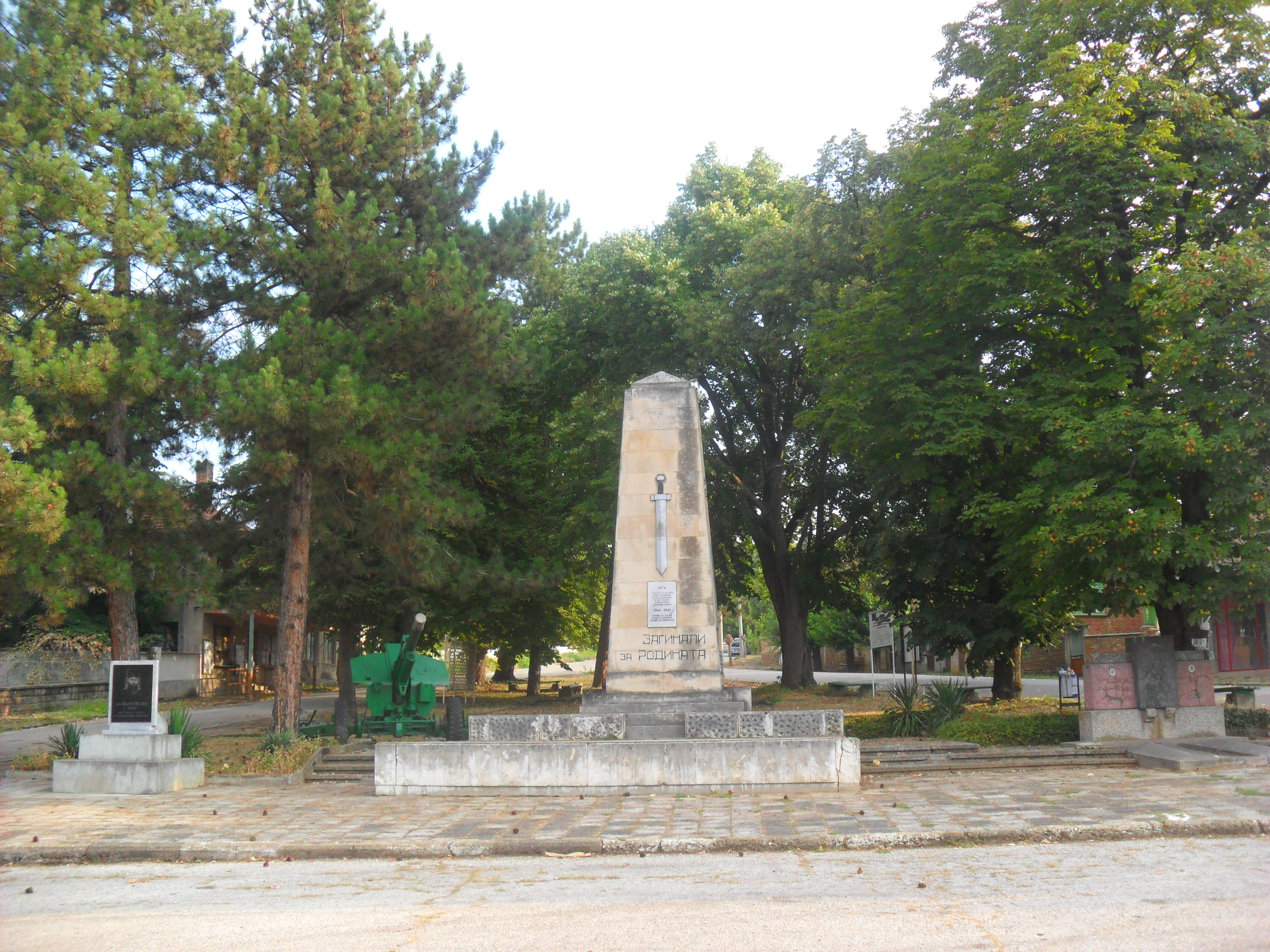
Monuments of Priest Balcho, Soldiers who died for Bulgaria (center) and Fighters for the People's Republic of Bulgaria (left)

The army of Stefan Karadzha and Hadzhi Dimitar passes in the area of the village on 20-21 of July 1876. It had two battles in the hill Kanladere.

=== People`s Republic of Bulgaria ===
In 1951 it were published the first local newspaper called "Житен Клас" (English: "Wheatear"). It were published in 1945 in around 800 copies. After that in the next decades were published two other newspapers"Skapocenni zarna" (English: Precious grains) (1952) and "Kanla dere" (English: Blood river) (1981). Electricity was introduced to Vishovgrad in 1945. In 1947, government officials built a communal farm called the "TKZS." However, several family farms chose not to participate and continued to operate independently. A new post office was built in Vishovgrad in 1967. In those years in the area were planted under 100 000 trees. The monk Daniel Musinski collect information about the history of the village and the families relationships.

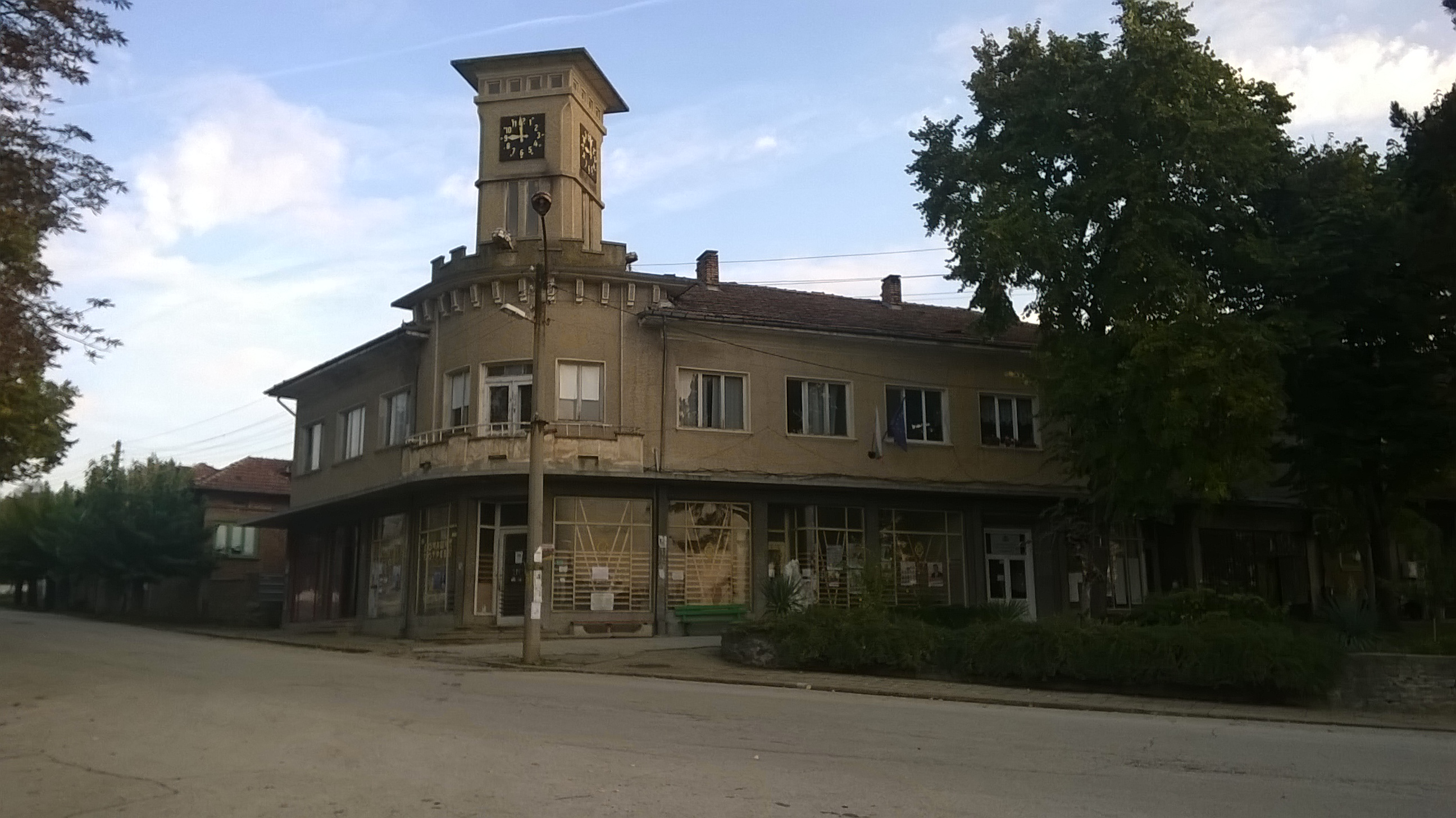
Town hall, built in 1961

=== Republic of Bulgaria ===
A citizen of Japan were lived in the village in the first years of Republic of Bulgaria. The Labor Cooperative farm and the factory were closed in the first years. The people take control of their woods and fields. The village today has a population of 200 to 300 permanent residents. Because of its location in the foothills of the Balkan Mountains, the village has attracted retired foreigners from various European countries, including Belgium and the UK. They often buy property in the village and either settle there permanently or use it as a summer home. In 2003 in Vishovgrad were conducted scientist conference "The History of Vishovgrad".

== Education ==
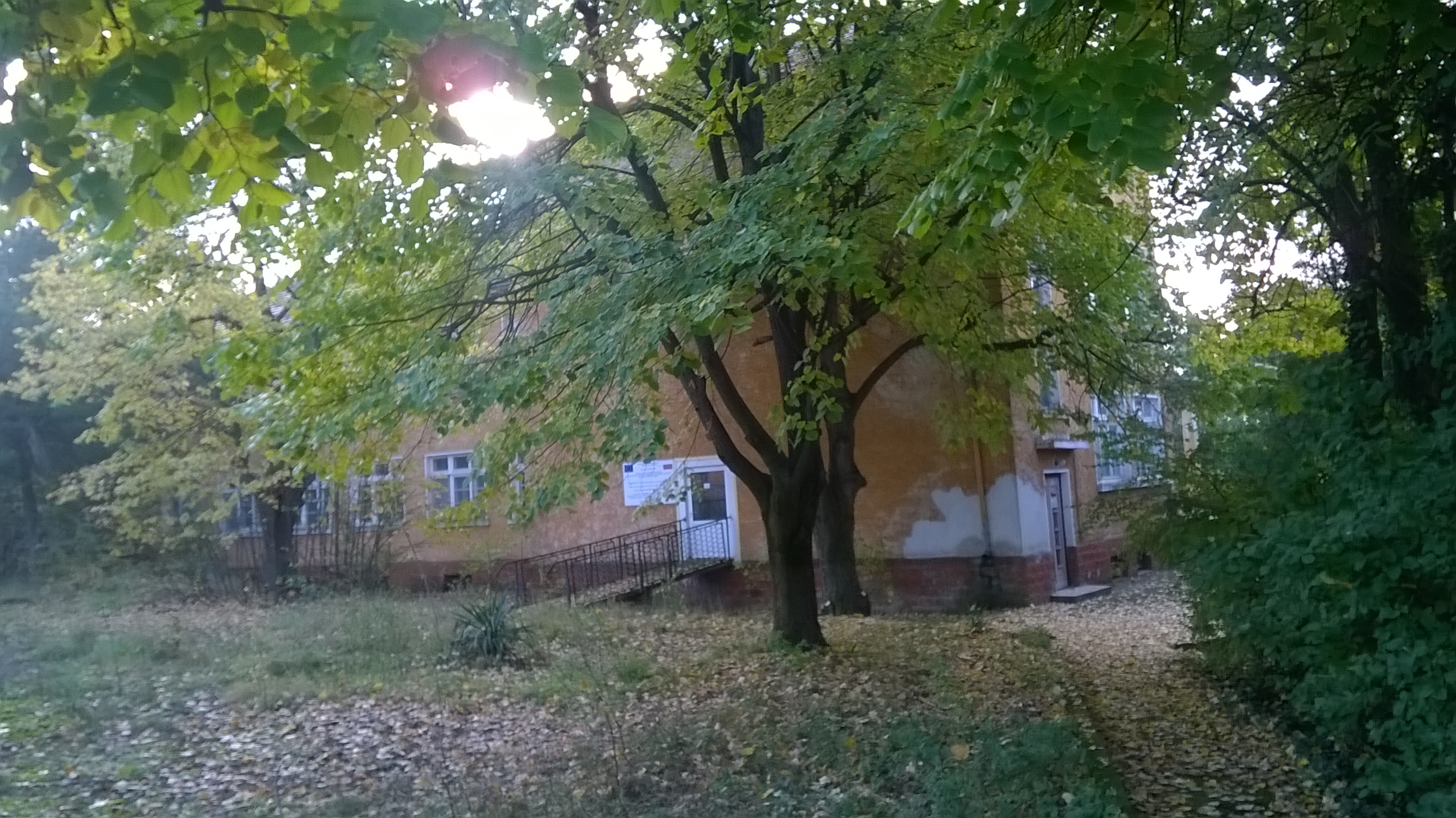
School Saint Kyril and Methodius

=== School St. Cyril and Methodius ===
The first school was established in 1826. The first teacher was Kutshia Daskal. In the first years some of the students paid with groshes, others with curves of wheat. The students were taught to read and write subjects such as the old Bulgarian language and Orthodox religion.

=== Library Radi Fichev ===
The first communication center was created in 1896. The institution was called "Kanla dere" (English: Blood river). It was renamed to the donor Radi Fichev in the 20th century.

== Population ==
=== Demographic ===
Year	1400	1550	1640	1820	1882	1893	1900	1923	1934	1946	1956	1965	1975	1984	1991	2001	2012
Population	560	500	820	2890	820	2 354	2 378	2 450	2 535	2 496	2 049	1 729	1 134	874	693	640	340

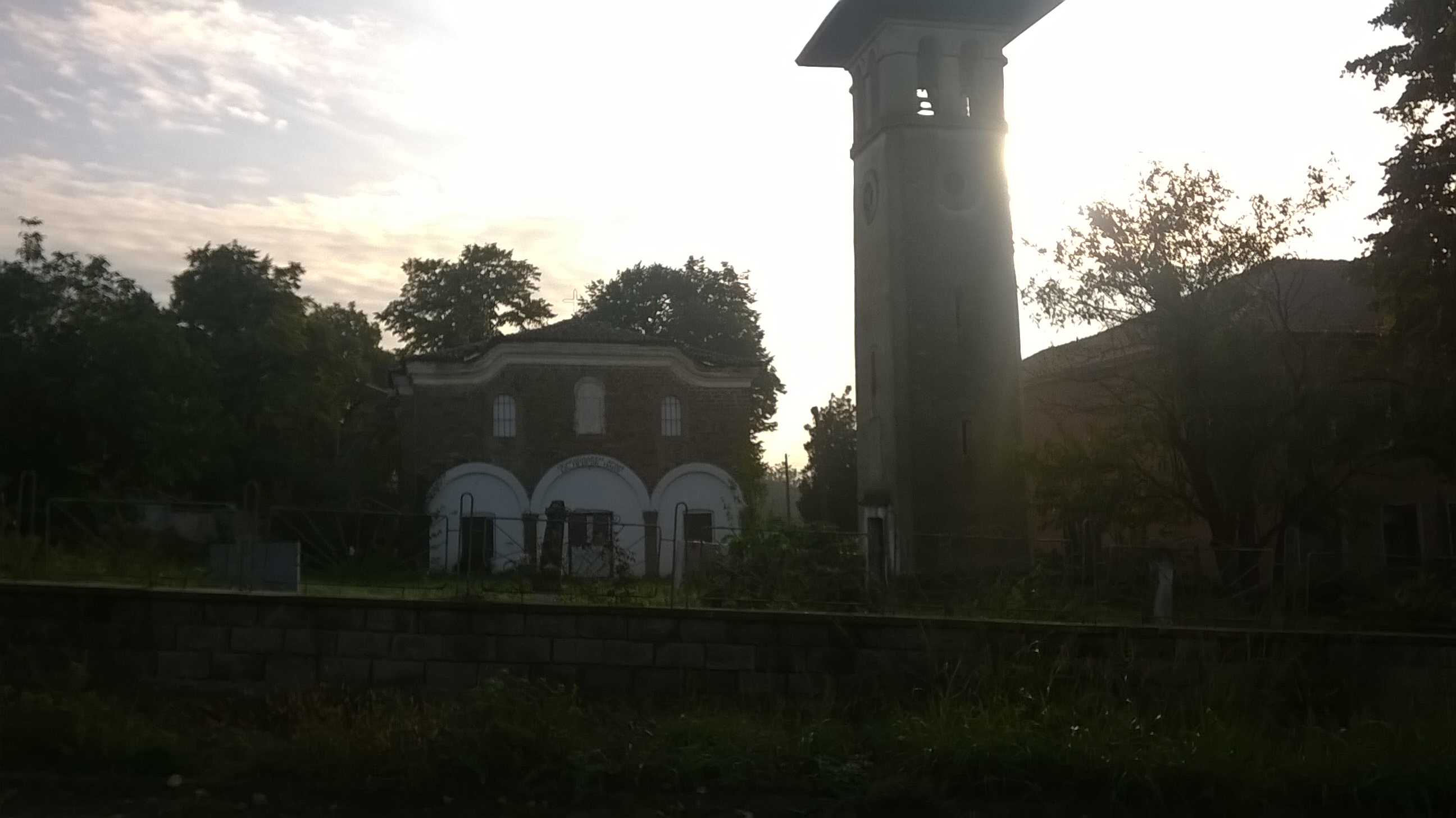
Orthodox Church Saint Iliya

=== Language ===
The Bulgarian language is official in Vishovgrad. The speech in this area is numbered among to the Eastern Bulgarian speech. The speech in the village is part from Mizyian speeches i.e. Mizyuian-Balkan speech.

=== Religion ===
The first church were constructed in 1850 in the place of today's school. The Orthodox church Saint Profit Iliya was built in 1897.

== Neighborhoods in Vishovgrad ==
=== Korea ===
This is original settlement site for the village of Vishovgrad, between the Chukata and Golish hills.

=== Varvishte ===
Located on the slope of Golish.

=== Selishte ===
One of the newest neighborhoods of Vishovgrad. The first houses were built in the years 1898–1901.

=== Cherven Bryag ===
Located in the southern part of the village, on the road to Sevlievo.

=== Localities ===
In Vishovgrad were defined 141 names if different localities. Some of the names of the localities are:Kukuvitsa, Baklitsa, Kara, Orman, Dribaka, Zadnica, Zarapovo and others.

== Culture ==
Since 1910, Vishovgrad has had groups for singing Bulgarian traditional songs and "old time" songs. They sing at the center of the village where people gather to listen, especially on festival days, when villagers are known to gather and celebrate all night.

Between 1947 and 1999, there was a group of native dancers that performed at every big feast and attended festivals of Bulgarian traditional music in different parts of the country. The group's membership peaked in the 1950s, when it boasted 50 members, some of whom were from the local school.

== Economy ==
=== Labor-Cooperative farm ===
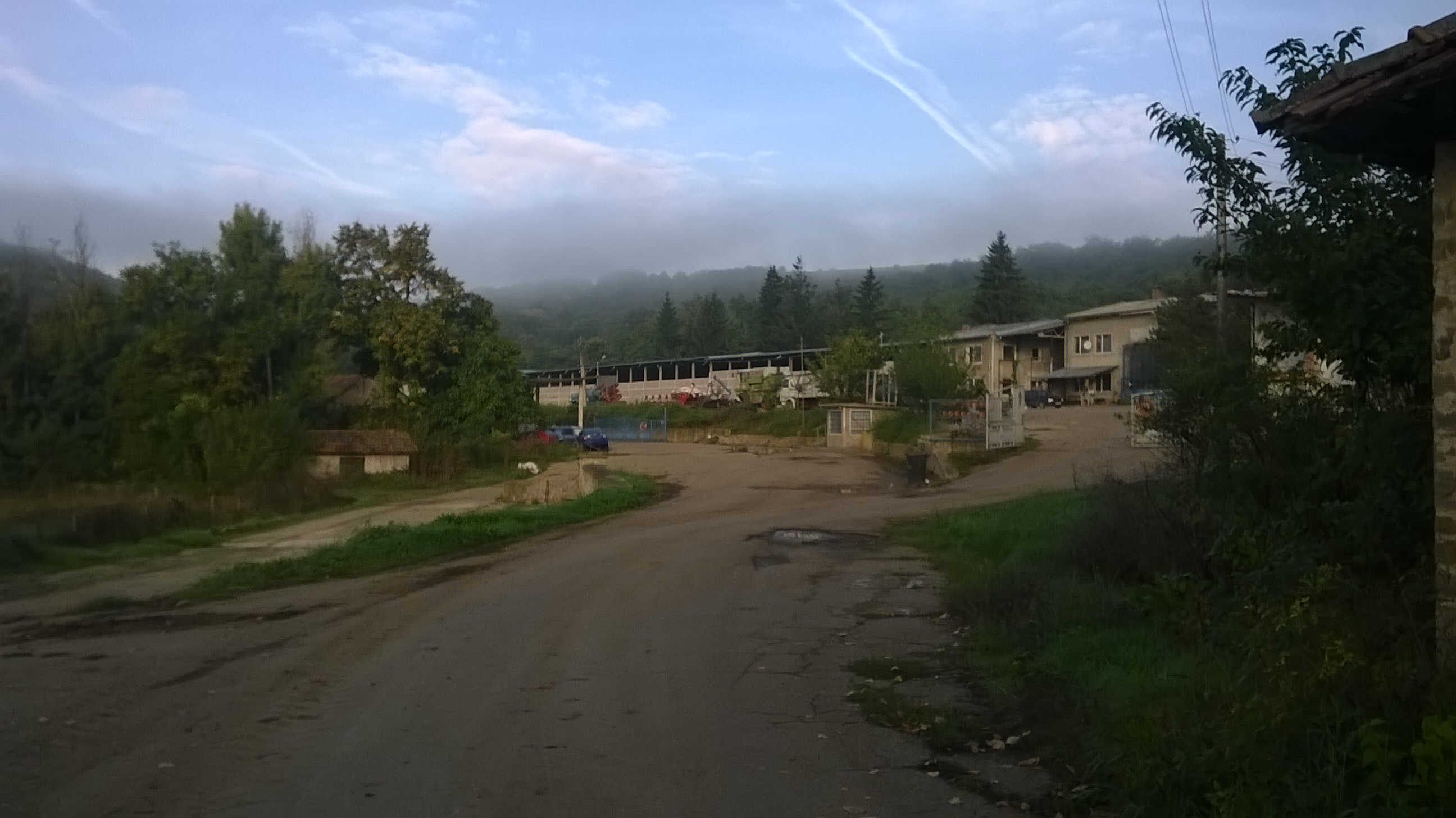
Labor cooperative farm Vishovgrad

Vishovgrad has a stone workshop, formerly a factory for textile and agricultural companies. The stone workshop was founded at the end of the 1950s to acquire and transport stone for the roads in Veliko Tarnovo Province under the governance of the People's Republic of Bulgaria. Stones were transported in old German trucks and Russian KrAZ trucks and initially had only 20 employees. By the 1970s, the workshop had increased its employment to 80. The People's Republic of Bulgaria at that time was able to purchase new equipment, including a new truck, to enhance the stone workshop's capacity. In 1978, the company renovated its location to improve the quality of its work.

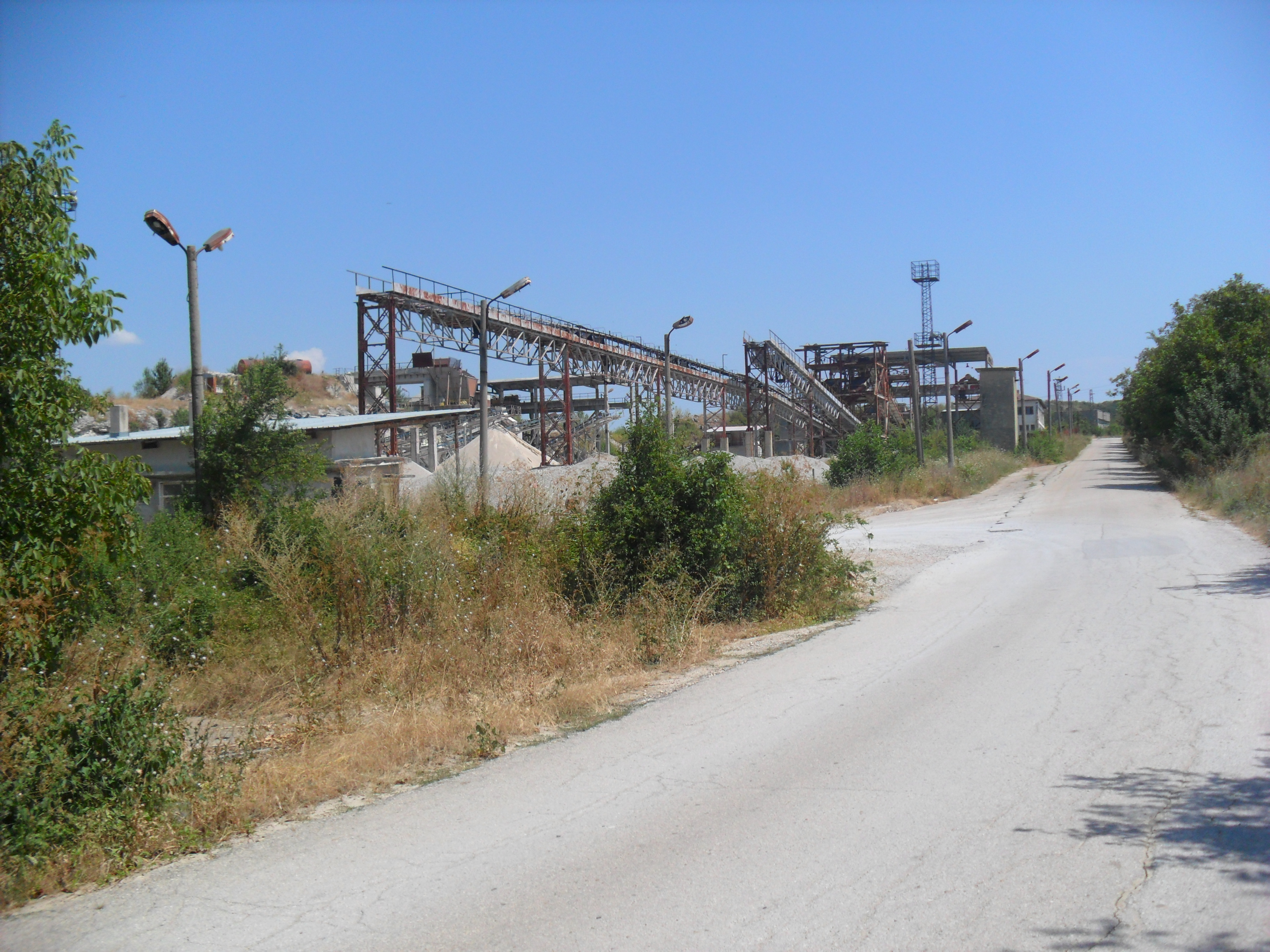
Stone quarry

== Sports ==
The football team of the village, CSKA Vishovgrad, started in the 1930s. CSKA Vishovgrad played in Veliko Tarnovo's provincial league and had particularly good results in 1950 and 1951. Players from this team were transferred to the teams of Pavlikeni and Veliko Tarnovo.

When the village had many young people, they also played sports like basketball and volleyball, but there have been no formal teams equivalent to the soccer team CSKA Vishovfgrad.

== Transport ==
There are several ways to reach Vishovrad by public transportation.

=== By train ===
The closest train station is located in the town of Pavlikeni, which is just 10 km away from the village of Vishovgrad. Pavlikeni lies on one of the major train routes in Bulgaria connecting Sofia and Varna. The train journeys from both Sofia and Varna takes approximately 3.5 hours. The only way to reach Vishovgrad from Pavlikeni is by bus or taxi. Several buses connecting towns in the area pass by Vishovgrad. Taxis can be found right outside the train station in Pavlikeni.

=== By bus ===
Many of the bus companies in Bulgaria pass through the city of Veliko Turnovo, located about 35 km southeast of Vishovgrad. There are only two buses that go to Vishovgrad from Veliko Turnovo.

== Notable people ==
- Mircho - leader
- Priest Balcho Kolev
- Penka, the mother of Petko Slaveykov, was born in Vishovgrad
- Tsona Dobreva - mother of Bacho Kiro
- Miladin Ivanov Kolev - professor at the University of Veliko Tarnovo
- Trifon Trifonovski - writer

== Festivals ==
- 1 January - New Year
- 2 August (Old Ilinden) - Village festival
- 23 July - The battle of Stefan Karadja
- 25 December - Christmas

== Landmarks ==
- Monument in Dalgi dol
- Monument in Kanla dere
- The Zarapovo's waterfall

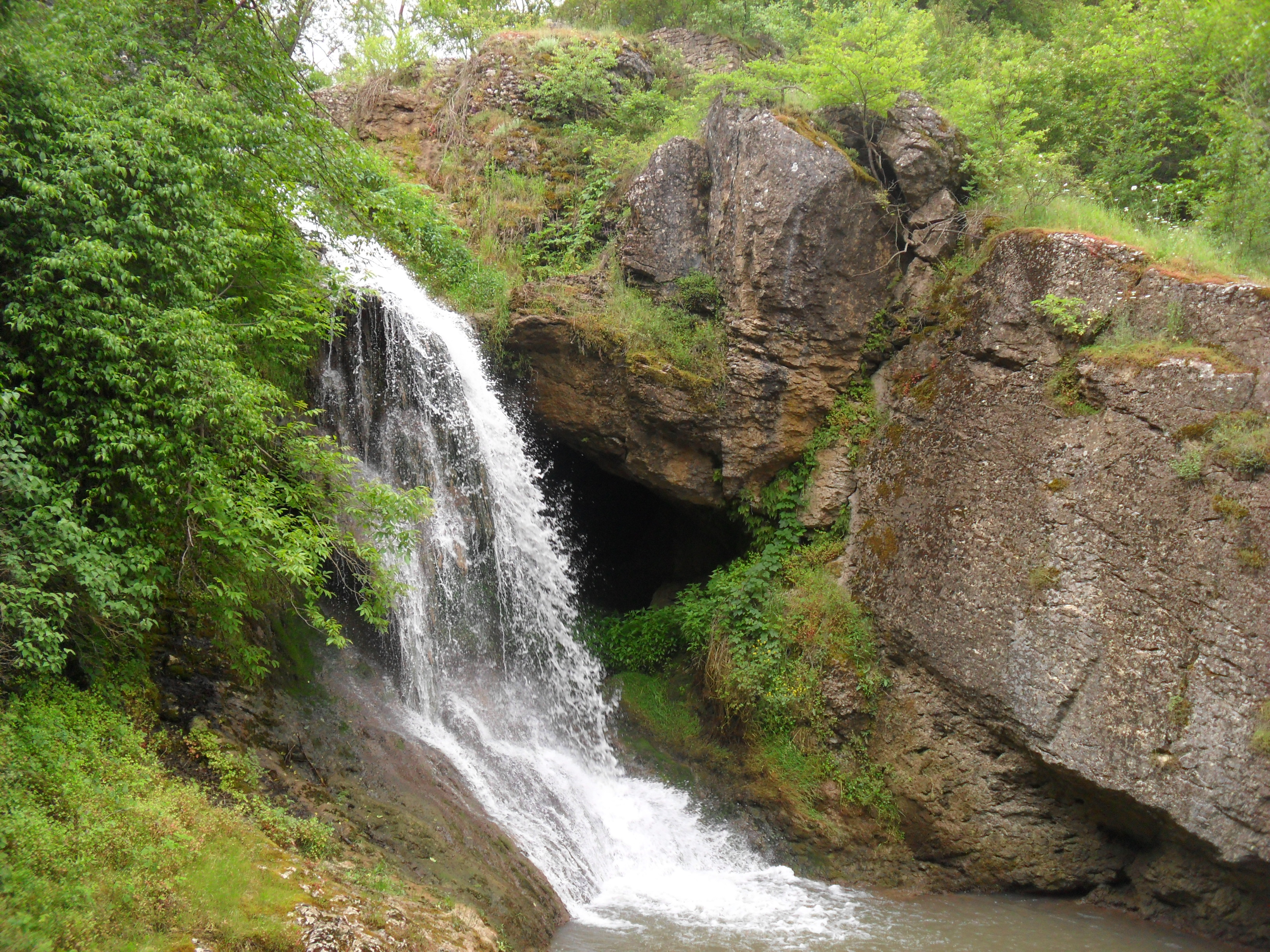
The waterfall in Zarapovo

== Gallery ==
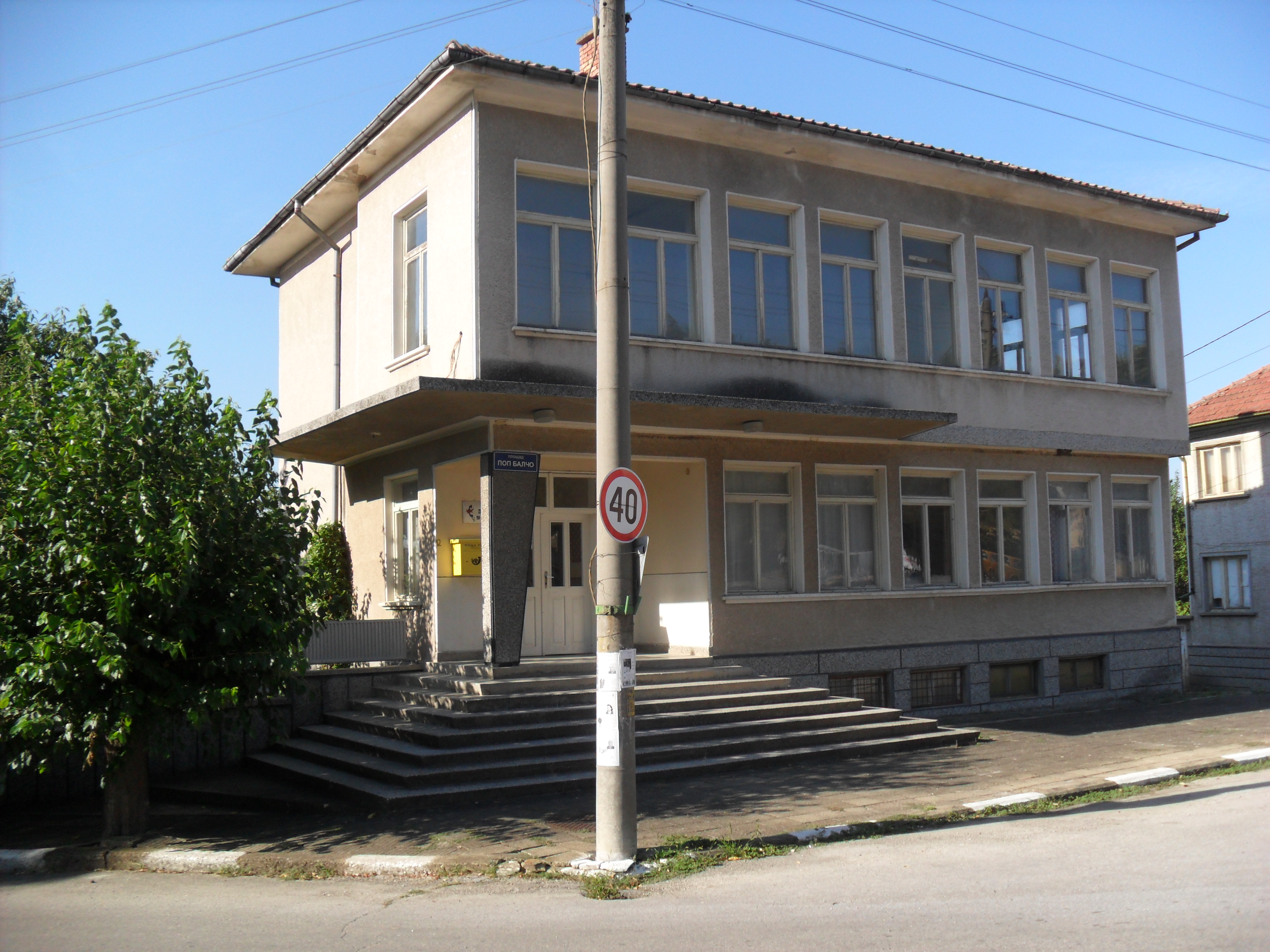
Post office

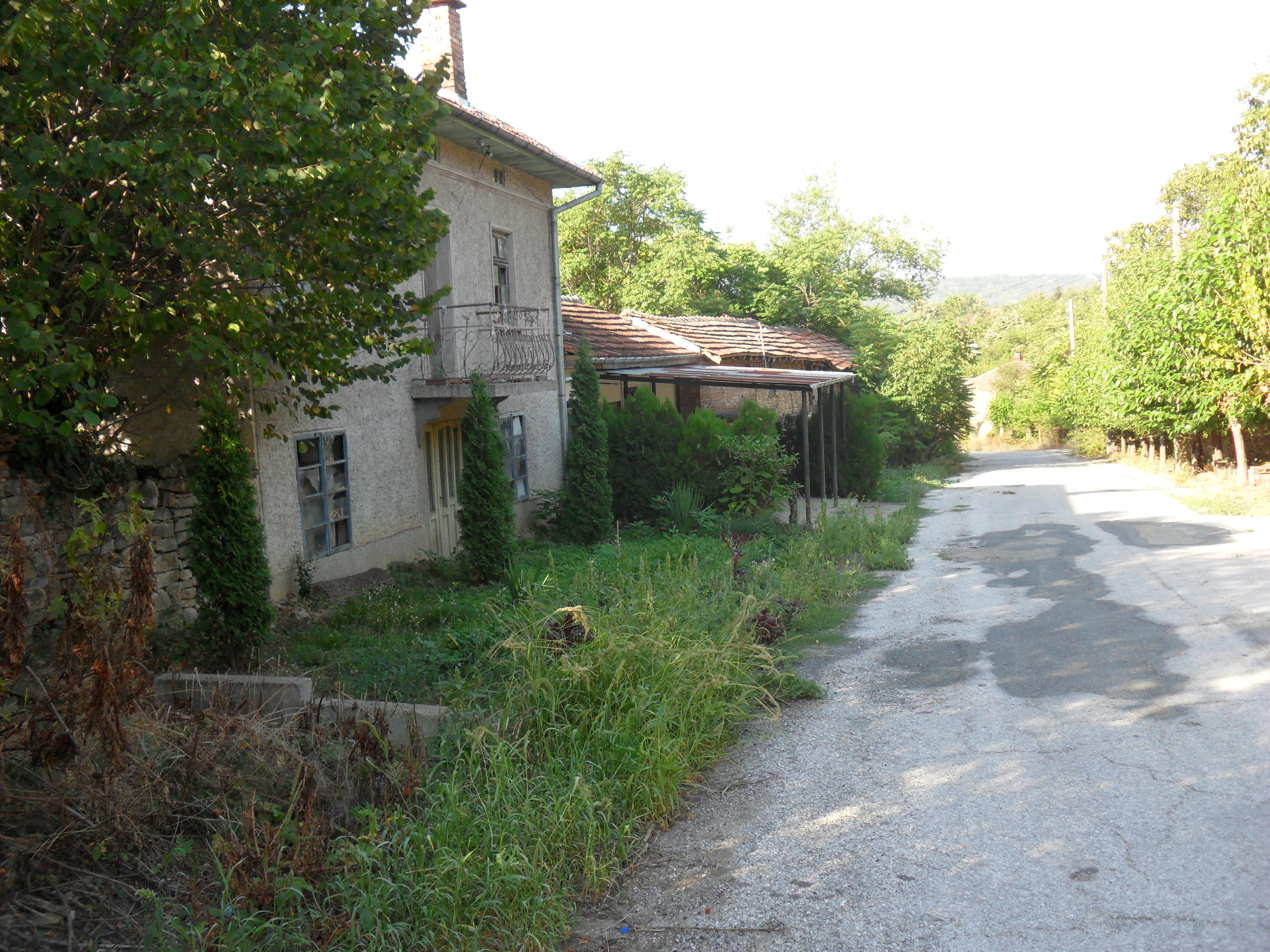
Old workshop

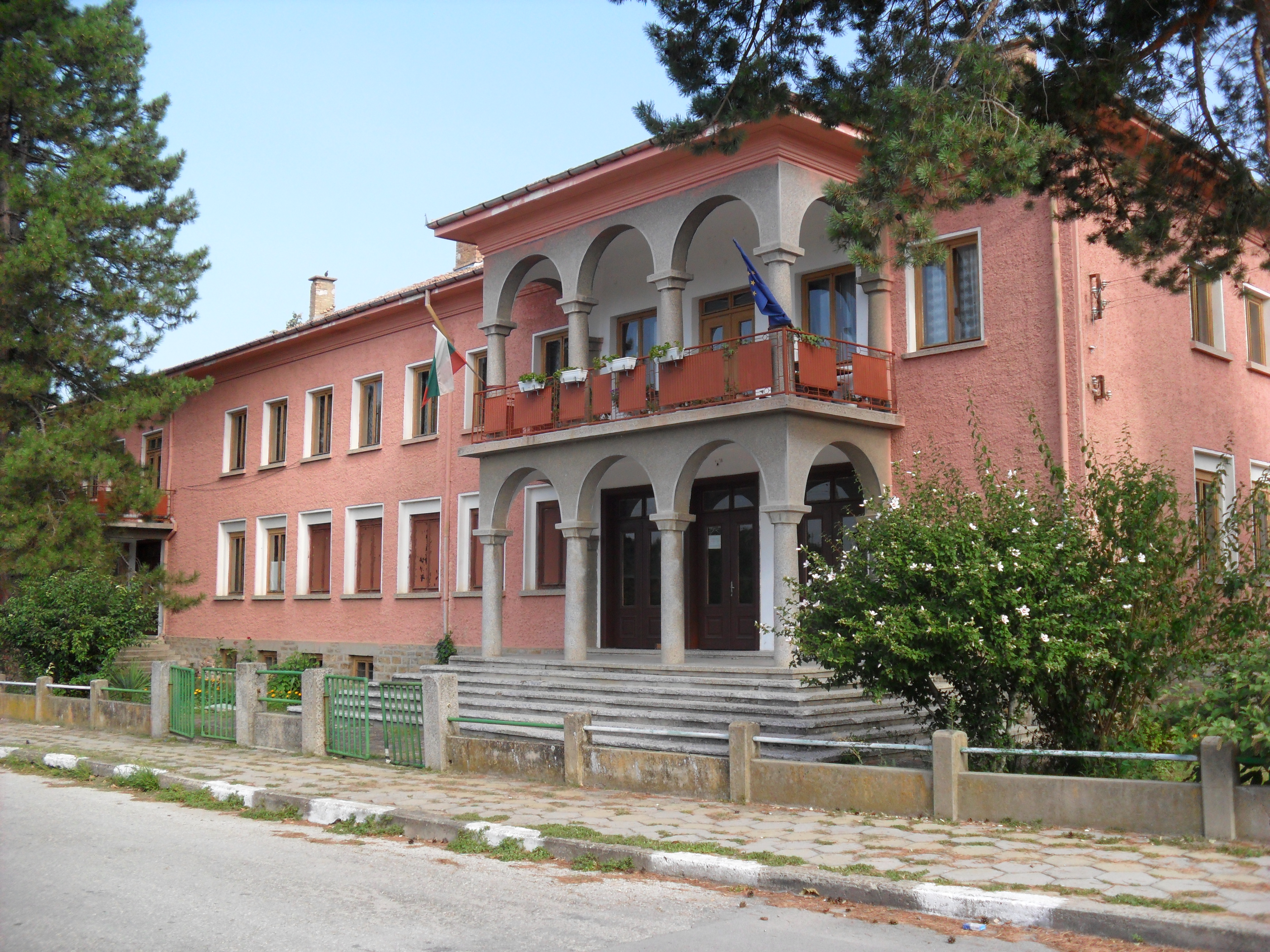
Library

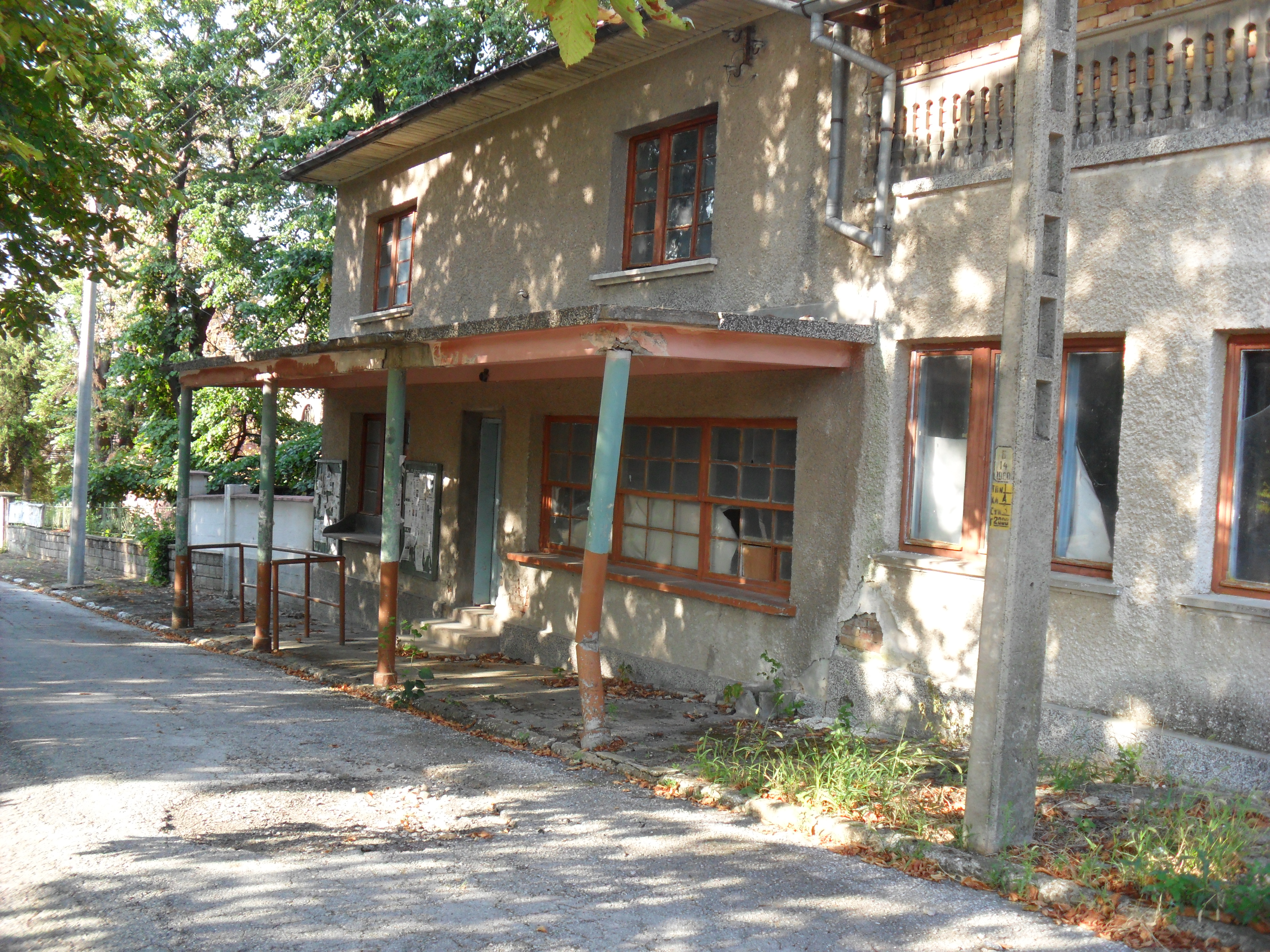
Bakery

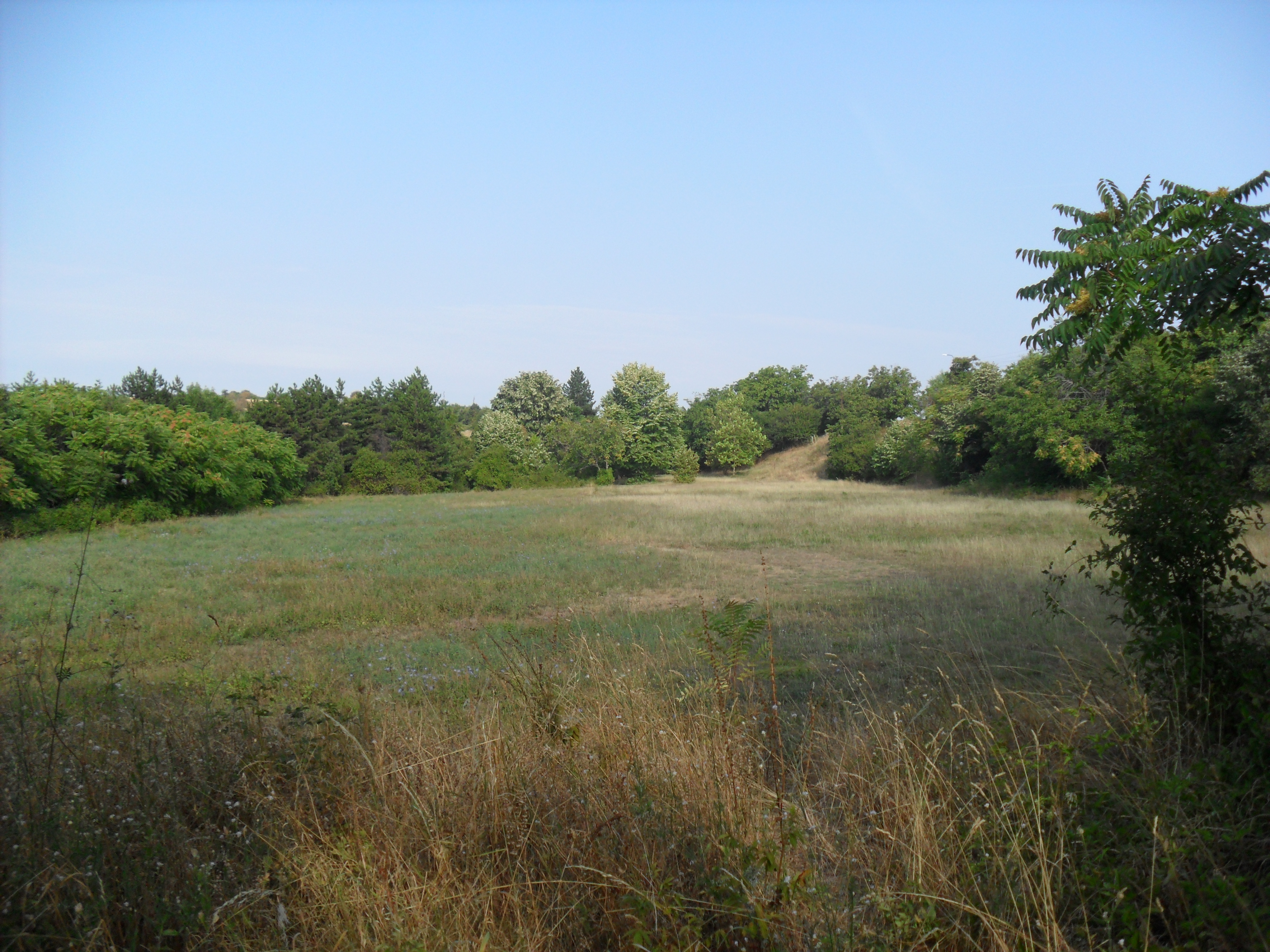
Stadium
