= List of settlements in the Pella regional unit =

This is a list of settlements in the Pella regional unit, Greece.

- Achladochori
- Agios Athanasios
- Agios Georgios
- Agios Loukas
- Agras
- Agrosykia
- Akrolimni
- Aloros
- Ampeleies
- Anydro
- Apsalos
- Aravissos
- Archangelos
- Aridaia
- Arnissa
- Arseni
- Aspro
- Athyra
- Axos
- Chrysi
- Dafni
- Dorothea
- Drosero
- Dytiko
- Edessa
- Esovalta
- Exaplatanos
- Filoteia
- Flamouria
- Foustani
- Galatades
- Garefeio
- Giannitsa
- Grammatiko
- Ida
- Kali
- Kallipoli
- Kalyvia
- Karydia
- Karyotissa
- Konstantia
- Kranea
- Krya Vrysi
- Lakka
- Liparo
- Lipochori
- Loutraki
- Lykostomo
- Mandalo
- Mavrovouni
- Megaplatanos
- Melissi
- Mesimeri
- Milea
- Mylotopos
- Nea Pella
- Nea Zoi
- Neromyloi
- Nisi
- Notia
- Orma
- Palaifyto
- Palaios Mylotopos
- Panagitsa
- Pella
- Peraia
- Perikleia
- Petraia
- Piperies
- Plagiari
- Platani
- Polykarpi
- Profitis Ilias
- Promachoi
- Rachona
- Rizari
- Rizo
- Sarakinoi
- Sevastiana
- Skydra
- Sosandra
- Sotira
- Theodorakeio
- Thiriopetra
- Trifylli
- Tsakoi
- Voreino
- Vryta
- Xifiani

== See also ==
- Slavic toponyms of places in Pella Prefecture
- List of towns and villages in Greece
