= List of former toponyms in Pella Prefecture =

Many inhabited places in Pella Prefecture of Greece have both Slavic and Greek forms. Some of the forms are identifiably of Greek origin, others of Slavic, yet others of Turkish or more obscure origins.

Slavic language
Turkish language

Slavic name(s)	Current official name other Greek names	Geographic Coordinates	Citation	Population (2001)	Other
Arsen	Arsenio (Αρσένιο)	40°43′N 22°10′E	p. 43	1,409	
Banya	Loutrochori (Λουτροχώρι)	40°43′N 22°07′E	p. 43	466	
Begna	Agios Spyridon (Άγιος Σπυρίδων)	40°47′N 21°46′E	p. 43		
Vladovo	Agras (Άγρας)	40°48′N 22°00′E	p. 44	883	
V'lkojanevo	Lykoi (Λύκοι)	40°50′N 22°00′E	p. 44	64	
V'ngeni	Sevastiana (Σεβαστιανά)	40°46′N 22°07′E	p. 44	1,501	
Voden	Edessa (Έδεσσα)	40°48′N 22°03′E	p. 45	18, 253	Capital of the prefecture
Vrbeni	Nea Zoi (Νέα Ζωή)	40°51′N 22°06′E	p. 46	201	
Vrtikop, Vertikop, Vrtekop	Skydra (Σκύδρα)	40°46′N 22°10′E	p. 46	5,081	
Gorno Gramatikovo, Kolibi	Ano Grammatiko (Άνω Γραμματικό)	40°42′N 21°57′E	p. 47	78	
Gorno Lipoor	Ano Lipochori (Άνω Λιποχώρι)	40°46′N 22°10′E	p. 47		
Gugovo	Vryta (Βρυτά)	40°48′N 21°55′E	p. 47	506	
Dolno Gramatikovo, Gramatikovo	Kato Grammatiko (Κάτω Γραμματικό)	40°42′N 21°54′E	p. 48	230	
Dolno Lipoor	Kato Lipochori, Lipochori (Κάτω Λιποχώρι, Λιποχώρι)	40°45′N 22°11′E	p. 48	1,032	
Drushka	Drosia (Δροσιά)	40°48′N 21°53′E	p. 48	68	
Zhervi	Zervi (Ζέρβη)	40°51′N 21°50′E	p. 49	349	
Jaborjani, Jaboreni	Platani (Πλατάνη)	40°46′N 22°03′E	p. 49	465	
Kamenik	Petraia (Πετραία)	40°43′N 22°09′E	p. 49; GeoNames	921	both Greek & Slavic names mean "rocky"
K'drovo, K'drevo	Agios Dimitrios, Kedrona (Άγιος Δημήτριος, Κεδρώνα)	40°45′N 21°55′E	p. 50	63	
Kolibi na Janakula	Kalyvia, Kalyvia Giannakoula (Καλύβια, Καλύβια Γιαννακούλα)	40°54′N 21°52′E	p. 50	1,186	
Kolibi na Nana	Kalyvia Nanna (Καλύβια Νάννα)	40°55′N 21°48′E	p. 50		
Kosten, Kostino	Kosteno (Κόστενο)	40°55′N 21°48′E	p. 50		
Kotugeri, Kutugeri	Kaisariana (Καισαριανά)	40°45′N 22°04′E	p. 50	116	
Kochana	Peraia (Περαία)	40°44′N 21°49′E	p. 51	352	
Krontselevo, Krontselovo	Kerasies (Κερασιές, Κερασέαι)	40°53′N 21°58′E	p. 51	455	
Lukovets (Staro Lukovets)	Palaia Sotira, Sotira (Παλαιά Σωτήρα, Σωτήρα)	40°51′N 22°04′E	p. 51	2	
Mesimer	Mesimeri (Μεσημέρι)	40°47′N 22°02′E	p. 52	930	
Nisija	Nisi, Pella (Νησί)	40°50′N 21°56′E	p. 52	415	
Nov Chegan	Neos Agios Athanasios (Νέος Άγιος Αθανάσιος)	40°50′N 21°48′E	p. 52	460	
Novo Lukovets	Sotira, Nea Sotira (Σωτήρα, Νέα Σωτήρα)	40°52′N 22°03′E	p. 52	226	
Novo Rusilovo	Nea Xanthogeia (Νέα Ξανθόγεια)	40°49′N 21°52′E	p. 53	114	
Novo Selo, Eni Kjoj	Plevroma (Πλεύρωμα)	40°43′N 22°08′E	p. 53	294	Yeni Köy ("new village") in Turkish
Orizari	Rizarion (Ριζάριον)	40°47′N 22°06′E	p. 53	1,129	
Orman Chiflik	Dendri (Δενδρί)	40°45′N 22°08′E	p. 53		
Oslovo	Panagitsa (Παναγίτσα)	40°51′N 21°51′E	p. 54	730	
Ostrovo	Arnissa (Άρνισσα)	40°48′N 21°50′E	p. 54; GeoNames	1,550	
Oshljani	Agia Foteini (Αγία Φωτεινή)	40°43′N 22°00′E	p. 54	299	
Patechina	Patima (Πάτημα)	40°51′N 21°53′E	p. 55		
Pachareshkjoj	Proastion Edessis (Προάστιον Έδεσσας)	40°47′N 22°04′E	p. 55	48	
Pod	Flamouria (Φλαμουριά)	40°45′N 22°01′E	p. 55	675	
Pochep	Margarita (Μαργαρίτα)	40°53′N 22°02′E	p. 56	22,209	
Prakhna, Prakhnjani	Aspro (Άσπρο)	40°44′N 22°13′E	p. 56	794	
Rizovo	Rizo (Ριζό)	40°44′N 22°08′E	p. 57	1,081	
Rusilovo	Xanthogeia (Ξανθόγεια)	40°48′N 21°52′E	p. 57	2	
Samar	Samari (Σαμάρι)	40°49′N 22°06′E	p. 57	91	
Sveti Ilija, Mechkili	Profitis Ilias (Προφήτης Ηλίας)	40°49′N 22°10′E	p. 58	1,290	both Greek & Slavic names mean "Prophet Elijah"
Teovo	Karydia (Καρυδιά)	40°51′N 21°56′E	p. 58	438	
Trebolets	Mavrovouni (Μαυροβούνιον)	40°47′N 22°10′E	p. 58	1,029	
Furka	Fourka (Φούρκα)	40°48′N 22°00′E	p. 59		
Tsrkovjani	Ekklisiochori (Εκκλησιοχώρι)	40°49′N 22°04′E	p. 59	415	both Greek & Slavic names mean "church village"
Chegan	Agios Athanasios, Meteora (Άγιος Αθανάσιος, Μετέωρα)	40°50′N 21°46′E	p. 59	184	
Alar	Archontikon (Αρχοντικόν)	40°47′N 22°29′E	p. 63	231	
Asarbegovo, Asar Bey	Drosero (Δροσερό)	40°49′N 22°15′E	p. 63	496	
Babjani	Laka (Λάκκα)	40°51′N 22°15′E	p. 63	401	
Baldzha, Bal'dzha	Melissi (Μελίσσιον)	40°46′N 22°21′E	p. 63	983	
Bozets	Athyra (Άθυρα)	40°50′N 22°36′E	p. 64; GeoNames	1,693	
V'drishta, Sari Kadi	Palaios Mylotopos (Παλαιός Μυλότοπος)	40°48′N 22°20′E	p. 64	831	
Veti Pazar, Eskidzhe	Pontochori, Palaion, Palaion Palaion (Ποντοχώρι, Παλαιόν, Παλαιόν Παλαιόν)	40°48′N 22°21′E	p. 65	58	
Vrezhot, Vres	Agios Loukas (Άγιος Λουκάς)	40°43′N 22°18′E	p. 65	1,555	
Golo Selo	Akrolimni, Gymna (Ακρολίμνη, Γυμνά)	40°41′N 22°16′E	p. 66; GeoNames	1,340	
Gorno Vlasi	Esovalta (Εσώβαλτα)	40°43′N 22°16′E	p. 66	989	
Gorno Krushare	Eso Achladochori (Έσω Αχλαδοχώρι)	40°43′N 22°15′E	p. 66		both Greek & Slavic names mean "upper pear-village"
Gradishte, Palikastro	Kyrros, Palaiokastron (Κύρρος, Παλαιόκαστρον)	40°50′N 22°19′E	p. 66		
Gropino	Dafni, Valtolivadon (Δάφνη, Βαλτολίβαδον)	40°46′N 22°14′E	p. 67	667	
Grubevtsi, Gurbesh	Agrosykia, Agriosykia (Αγροσυκέα. Αγριοσυκέα)	40°51′N 22°30′E	p. 67	384	
Damjan, Sulukli	Damiano (Δαμιανόν)	40°50′N 22°27′E	p. 67	381	
Dolno Vlasi	Exovalta (Εξώβαλτα)	40°44′N 22°17′E	p. 67		
Dolno Krushare	Exo Achladochori (Έξω Αχλαδοχώριον)	40°44′N 22°15′E	p. 68		
Gjupchevo	Gypsochori (Γυψοχώρι)	40°49′N 22°16′E	p. 68	470	
Enidzhe Vardar, Pazar	Giannitsa (Γιαννιτσά)	40°47′N 22°25′E	p. 69	26,296	Yenice/Yenidje Vardar in Turkish
Kadinovo, Kasino Selo, Sujukli	Galatades (Γαλατάδες)	40°45′N 22°17′E	p. 69	2,339	
Kalinitsa, Jach Kjoj	Kali (Καλή)	40°49′N 22°11′E	p. 70	1,684	
Kara Khamza	Kallipoli (Καλλίπολις)	40°47′N 22°14′E	p. 70	484	
Kariotitsa, Stara Kariotitsa	Palaia Karyotissa (Παλαιά Καρυώτισσα)	40°45′N 22°20′E	p. 70		
Kolibite, Kolibalar	Kalyvia (Καλύβια)	40°45′N 22°13′E	p. 71		
Konikovo	Dytiko (Δυτικόν)	40°51′N 22°32′E	p. 71	477	
Kornishor	Kromni (Κρώμνη)	40°54′N 22°20′E	p. 71	14	
Krushari, Armuchi, Krushare	Ampeleies, Ampelia (Αμπελείες, Αμπελείαι)	40°51′N 22°24′E	p. 72; GeoNames	1,095	
K'salar	Achladochori, Mandarai (Αχλαδοχώριον, Μανδαραί)	40°50′N 22°21′E	p. 72	417	
Liparinovo	Liparo (Λιπαρό)	40°45′N 22°15′E	p. 73	478	
Litovoj	Leptokarya, Litovoion (Λεπτοκαρυά, Λιτοβόϊον)	40°51′N 22°28′E	p. 73	215	
Lozanovo	Palaifyto (Παλαίφυτο)	40°47′N 22°17′E	p. 73	1,468	
Mavrejnovo	Mavron (Μαύρον)	40°51′N 22°13′E	p. 74		
Mandalevo	Mandalon (Μάνδαλον)	40°51′N 22°13′E	p. 74	1,153	
Nedirchevo, Nad'r	Anydro (Άνυδρο)	p. 74	534		
Neon Paleon	Axos, Palaion, Neon Palaion (Αξός, Παλαιόν, Νέον Παλαιόν)	40°48′N 22°22′E	p. 75	1,442	
Neos Milotopos, Novo V'drishta	Neos Mylotopos (Νέος Μυλότοπος)	40°49′N 22°21′E	p. 75	2,605	
Nova Kariotitsa, Kariotitsa	Karyotissa, Nea Karyotissa (Καρυώτισσα, Νέα Καρυώτισσα)	40°46′N 22°19′E	p. 75	1,999	
Obor, Dermenchik, Ombar	Aravissos (Αραβησσός)	40°50′N 22°18′E	p. 76	1,514	
Pilorik	Pentaplatanos, Pilorygio (Πενταπλάτανον, Πιλορύγιον)	40°49′N 22°25′E	p. 76; GeoNames	956	
Plasnichevo	Krya Vrysi (Κρύα Βρύση)	40°41′N 22°18′E	p. 76	6,535	
Plugar	Loudias (Λουδίας)	40°44′N 22°20′E	p. 77		
Postol, Sveti Apostol	Pella, Agioi Apostoloi, Palaia Pella (Πέλλα, Άγιοι Απόστολοι, Παλαιά Πέλλα)	40°45′N 22°32′E	p. 77	2,450	
P'rgas	Pyrgari (Πυργάρι)	40°45′N 22°21′E	p. 77		
Prizna	Vrasti (Βραστή)	40°42′N 22°20′E	p. 78		
Radomir	Asvestareio (Ασβεσταρειό)	40°52′N 22°25′E	p. 78; GeoNames	35	
Ramel	Rachona (Ραχώνα)	40°49′N 22°32′E	p. 78	626	
Sveti Gjorgji, Dort Armutlar	Agios Georgios (Άγιος Γεώργιος)	40°46′N 22°15′E	p. 79	359	
Sendelchevo	Sandali (Σανδάλι)	40°48′N 22°13′E	p. 79	212	
Spirlitovo, Ispirlik	Plagiari (Πλαγιάρι)	40°51′N 22°17′E	p. 79	363	
Tagarmish	Ydromyloi (Υδρόμυλοι)	40°50′N 22°34′E	p. 79		
Trifulchevo, Kadi Kjoj	Trifyli (Τριφύλλι)	40°47′N 22°16′E	p. 79	531	
Chaushlievo, Chaushli	Mesiano (Μεσιανό)	40°47′N 22°29′E	p. 80	341	
Chekri, Kirkalovo	Paralimni (Παραλίμνη)	40°45′N 22°28′E	p. 80	816	
Chichig's, Cheshig's	Stavrodromi (Σταυροδρόμιον)	40°43′N 22°13′E	p. 80	556	
Baovo, Bakhovo	Promachoi (Πρόμαχοι)	41°02′N 22°00′E	p. 83	1,825	
Berislavtsi, Berislav, Borislav	Perikleia (Περίκλεια)	41°06′N 22°16′E	p. 83	382	
Bizovo (Bizova in Turkish)	Megaplatanos]] (Μεγαπλάτανος)	40°56′N 21°59′E	p. 83	310	
Bidzhova Mala, Bidzho Makhala	Piperies (Πιπεριές, Πιπεριαί)	40°59′N 22°01′E	p. 84	589	
Volchishta, V'lchishta	Ydraia (Υδραία)	40°57′N 22°05′E	p. 84	462	
Gabrishta	Dorothea (Δωροθέα)	41°00′N 22°03′E	p. 85	633	
Gorno Pozhar	Ano Loutraki (Άνω Λουτράκι)	40°59′N 21°55′E	p. 85		
Gorno Rodivo	Ano Koryfi (Άνω Κορυφή)	40°56′N 21°54′E	p. 85		
Gorno Turmanli	Ano Rodonia (Άνω Ροδωνιά)	40°58′N 22°01′E	p. 86		
Gorno Tsrneshevo	Ano Garefeio, Garefeio (Άνω Γαρέφειο, Γαρέφειο)	41°02′N 22°03′E	p. 86	736	
Gostoljubi, Kostoljubi	Konstantia (Κωνσταντία)	41°00′N 22°10′E	p. 86	759	
Dolno Pozhar (Pojar in Turkish)	Loutraki, Kato Loutraki (Λουτράκι, Κάτω Λουτράκι)	40°58′N 21°57′E	p. 87	1,163	
Dolno Rodivo	Kato Koryfi (Κάτω Κορυφή)	40°55′N 21°56′E	p. 87	96	
Dolno Turmanli, Tormanli Makhala, Turmanli	Kato Rodonia (Κάτω Ροδωνιά)	40°57′N 22°02′E	p. 88		
Dolno Tsrneshevo	Kato Garefeio (Κάτω Γαρέφειο)	41°02′N 22°03′E	p. 88		
Dragomantsi	Apsalos (Άψαλος)	40°53′N 22°04′E	p. 88	1,178	
Drenovo	Krania (Κρανέα)	40°54′N 22°09′E	p. 89	130	
Eni Maala, Jeni Makhala	Mikrochori (Μικροχώρι)	40°59′N 22°01′E	p. 89		Turkish: Yeni Mahalla ("new quarter")
Izvor	Anavra (Ανάβρα)	41°03′N 22°08′E	p. 90		
Kapinjani	Exaplatanos (Εξαπλάτανος)	40°58′N 22°08′E	p. 90	1,768	
Kara Dere Vodenski	Mavrolakkon Vodenon (Μαυρόλακκον Βοδενών)	40°54′N 22°07′E	p. 90		"Kara Dere" (Turkish) and "Mavrolakkon" both mean "black hole"
Kara Dere Pazarski	Mavrolakkon Genitson (Μαυρόλακκον Γενιτσών)	40°55′N 22°07′E	p. 90		"Kara Dere" (Turkish) and "Mavrolakkon" both mean "black hole"
Karladovo (Karladova or Kırlat in Turkish)	Milea (Milia) (Μηλέα)	41°00′N 22°09′E	p. 91	677	
Kozhushani (Kuzuşen in Turkish)	Filoteia (Φιλώτεια)	41°02′N 22°10′E	p. 91	639	
Kosturino	Xifiani, Xyfonia (Ξιφιανή, Ξυφώνια)	40°56′N 22°05′E	p. 92	850	
Leskovo	Tria Elata (Τρία Έλατα)	41°02′N 22°15′E	p. 92		
Luguntsi, Luntsi	Langadia (Λαγκαδιά)	41°07′N 22°17′E	p. 92	89	
Manastir, Monastir, Monastirdzhik	Monastiraki (Μοναστηράκιον)	40°56′N 21°59′E	p. 93	169	
Nevor, Nevokhor, Nivor, Malo Severnik	Neochori (Νεοχώριον)	41°02′N 22°06′E	p. 94	469	
Novo Selo, Eni Kjoj	Litharia (Λιθαριά)	40°54′N 22°11′E	p. 94	6	
Novoseltsi	Neromylos (Νερόμυλοι)	41°02′N 22°12′E	p. 94; GeoNames	123	
Noti, N'ti	Notia (Νότια)	41°06′N 22°13′E	p. 95	388	
Oshin	Archangelos (Αρχάγγελος)	41°05′N 22°17′E	p. 96	686	
Pozharski Banji	Loutra Loutrakiou, Loutra Aridaias (Λουτρά Λουτρακίου, Λουτρά Αριδαίας)	40°58′N 21°55′E	p. 96	24	
Poljani	Polykarpi (Πολυκάρπι)	40°56′N 22°01′E	p. 96	1,071	
Preb'dishte (Prebiştine in Turkish)	Sosandra (Σωσάνδρα)	41°00′N 22°02′E	p. 97	1,206	
Prodrom	Prodromos (Πρόδρομος)	41°02′N 22°12′E	p. 97	186	
Ranislavtsi, Ranislav	Agathi (Αγάθη)	41°00′N 22°04′E	p. 98	58	
Rudino	Aloros (Άλωρος)	40°56′N 22°05′E	p. 98	464	
Ruzhjani (Rujiani in Turkish)	Rizochori (Ριζοχώρι)	41°01′N 22°08′E	p. 98	537	
Sarakinovo	Sarakinoi (Σαρακηνοί)	40°55′N 21°57′E	p. 99	375	
Sborsko, Zborsko	Pefkoto (Πευκωτό)	41°04′N 22°06′E	p. 99		
S'botsko, Sabotsko, Subotsko (Sıbıska or Sabusko in Turkish)	Aridaia, Ardea (Αριδαία, Αρδέα)	40°58′N 22°04′E	p. 99	5,600	
Severjani, Severni, Sevreli (Sevirni in Turkish)	Voreino (Βορεινό)	41°02′N 22°05′E	p. 100	871	both Slavic & Greek names mean "northern"
Slatina, Slatino (Slatin in Turkish)	Chrysi (Χρυσή)	40°57′N 22°07′E	p. 100	395	both Slavic & Greek names mean "golden"
Straishta, Vitolishta	Ida (Ίδα)	41°01′N 22°11′E	p. 101	735	
Strupino (Şturupino in Turkish)	Lykostomo (Λυκόστομο)	40°59′N 21°59′E	p. 101	395	
Tresino	Orma (Όρμα)	40°57′N 21°56′E	p. 101	649	
Trstenik (Tresnik in Turkish)	Thiriopetra (Θηριόπετρα)	41°03′N 22°10′E	p. 102	401	
Tudortsi, Todortsi, Tudurtsi	Theodorakeio (Θεοδωράκειο)	40°57′N 22°12′E	p. 102; GeoNames	772	
Tushim, Tushin	Aetochori (Αετοχώρι)	41°06′N 22°11′E	p. 103	62	
Fushtani	Foustani, Evropos (Φούστανη, Ευρωπός)	41°03′N 22°11′E	p. 103; GeoNames	542	
Tsakon Maala, Juruk Makhala	Tsaki, Tsakones (Τσάκοι, Τσάκωνες)	40°57′N 22°02′E	p. 104	1,020	
Tsakoni, Tsakon Chiflik	Chrysa (Χρύσα)	40°57′N 22°03′E	p. 104		
