= Lykostomo =

- Community
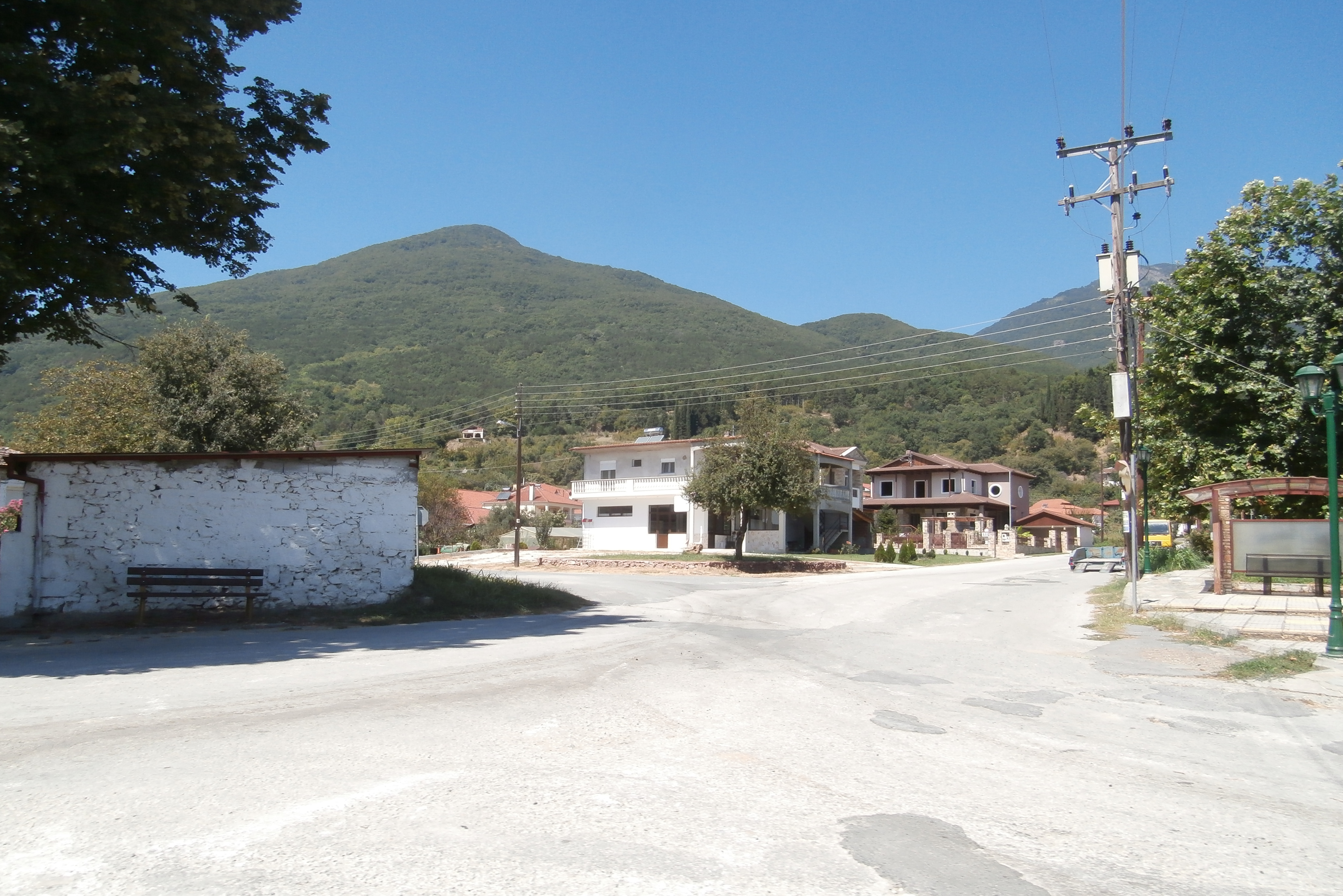

- Location within Greece
- Coordinates: 40°59′21″N 21°59′3″E
- Country: Greece
- Geographic region: Macedonia
- Administrative region: Central Macedonia
- Regional unit: Pella
- Municipality: Almopia
- Municipal unit: Aridaia

Population (2021)
  - Community: 336
- Time zone: UTC+2 (EET)
  - Summer (DST): UTC+3 (EEST)

Lykostomo (Greek: Λυκόστομο, before 1926: Στρούπινο – Stroupino Macedonian: Струпино) is a village in Pella regional unit, Macedonia, Greece.

Lykostomo had 382 inhabitants in 1981. In fieldwork done by anthropologist Riki Van Boeschoten in late 1993, Lykostomo was populated by Slavophones and a Greek population descended from Anatolian Greek refugees who arrived during the Greek–Turkish population exchange. The Macedonian language was spoken in the village by people over 30 in public and private settings. Children understood the language, but mostly did not use it. Pontic Greek was spoken in the village by people over 30 in public and private settings. Children understood the language, but mostly did not use it. Turkish was spoken by people over 60, mainly in private.
