= Theodorakeio =

- Community
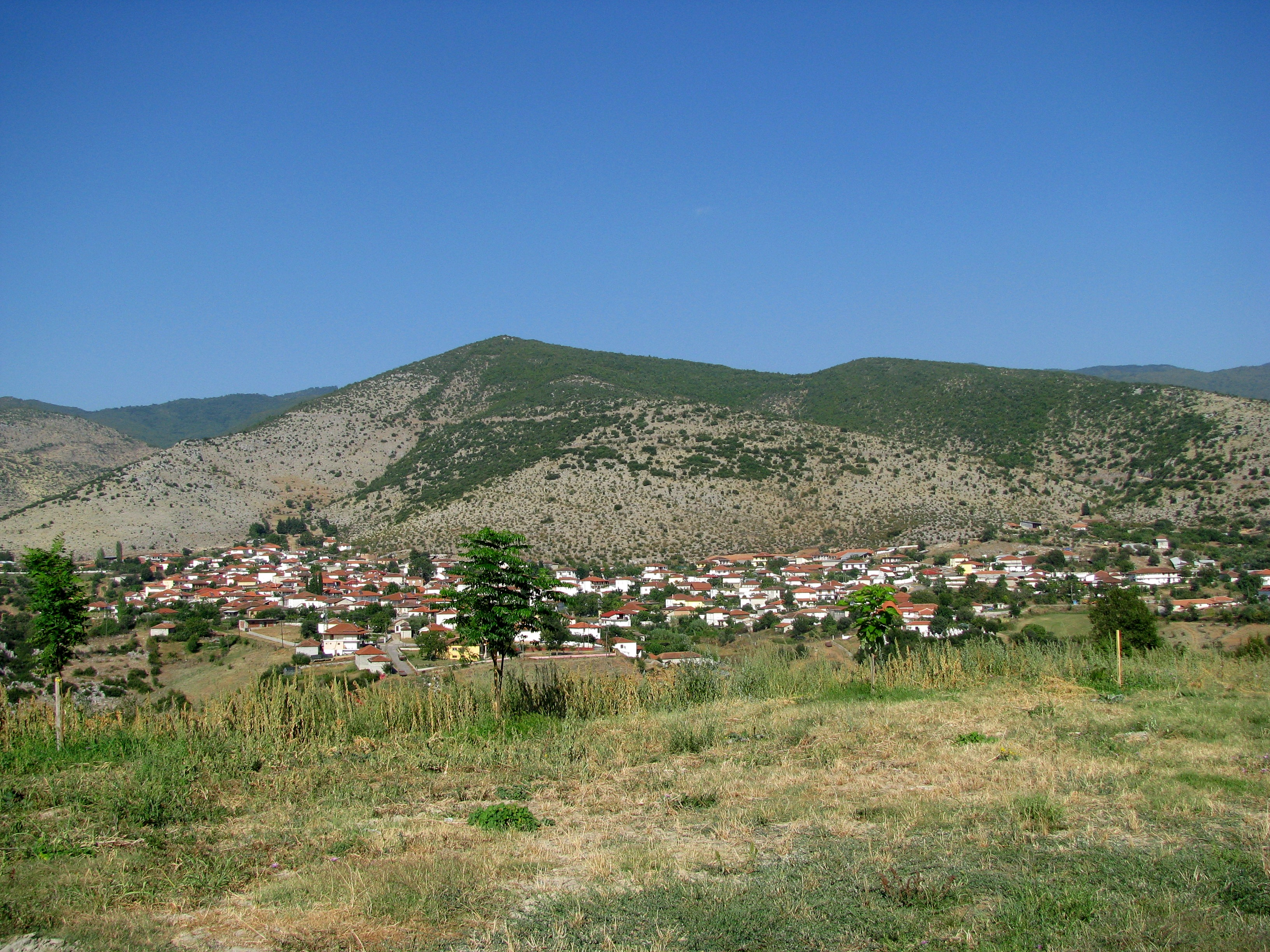
- General view of Theodorakeio

- Location within Greece
- Coordinates: 40°56′59″N 22°11′30″E
- Country: Greece
- Geographic region: Macedonia
- Administrative region: Central Macedonia
- Regional unit: Pella
- Municipality: Almopia
- Municipal unit: Exaplatanos

Population (2021)
  - Community: 488
- Time zone: UTC+2 (EET)
  - Summer (DST): UTC+3 (EEST)

Theodorakeio (Greek: Θεοδωράκειο, commonly referred to as Theodoraki) is a village in northern Greece and serves as the seat of the Community of Theodorakeio, within the Municipality of Almopia, Regional Unit of Pella, in the Region of Central Macedonia. According to the 2021 population census, the village has 488 inhabitants. Theodorakio is built on the western foothills of Mount Paiko, at an elevation of approximately 420 meters above sea level, a factor that contributes to its mountainous character and traditional rural landscape.

The local economy is primarily based on livestock farming and agriculture, with the cultivation of vineyards, olive trees, and cereal crops. Particular emphasis is also placed on cheese production; in this context, the village hosts an annual cheese festival every October.

Outside the village lies the Matitsa Dam, set within a forested gorge with a depth of approximately 15–18 meters. The area supports a rich aquatic ecosystem, including species such as carp, grass carp, wels catfish, as well as various other fish species and aquatic and riparian birdlife.

== History ==
Theodorakeio was founded in the 14th century; however, human presence in its area dates back to antiquity, as evidenced by the discovery within the village of coins from the era of Alexander the Great and Cassander. Moreover, on the right side of the road leading to the village entrance, the ruins of an ancient stone fortress are preserved on an elevated hill. This fortification functioned as a lookout over the broader region, primarily the ancient settlement of Konstantia, and as a control point for the shortest route crossing Mount Paiko, which connected Almopia with Bottiaea.

At this location once stood the village of Tserkovata Poulana, established in the late 14th century by inhabitants of Almopia who sought to avoid subjugation by the Ottoman Turks. From the summit of the fortress, the villagers monitored the plain for the presence of Ottoman detachments and launched attacks when such forces were detected. The Ottomans reportedly attempted to capture the settlement on several occasions and, according to local tradition, eventually succeeded. One night they invaded the village and killed all the male inhabitants, while the women, refusing to fall into captivity, are said to have collectively leapt from the cliff. Today, only ruins of the settlement remain.

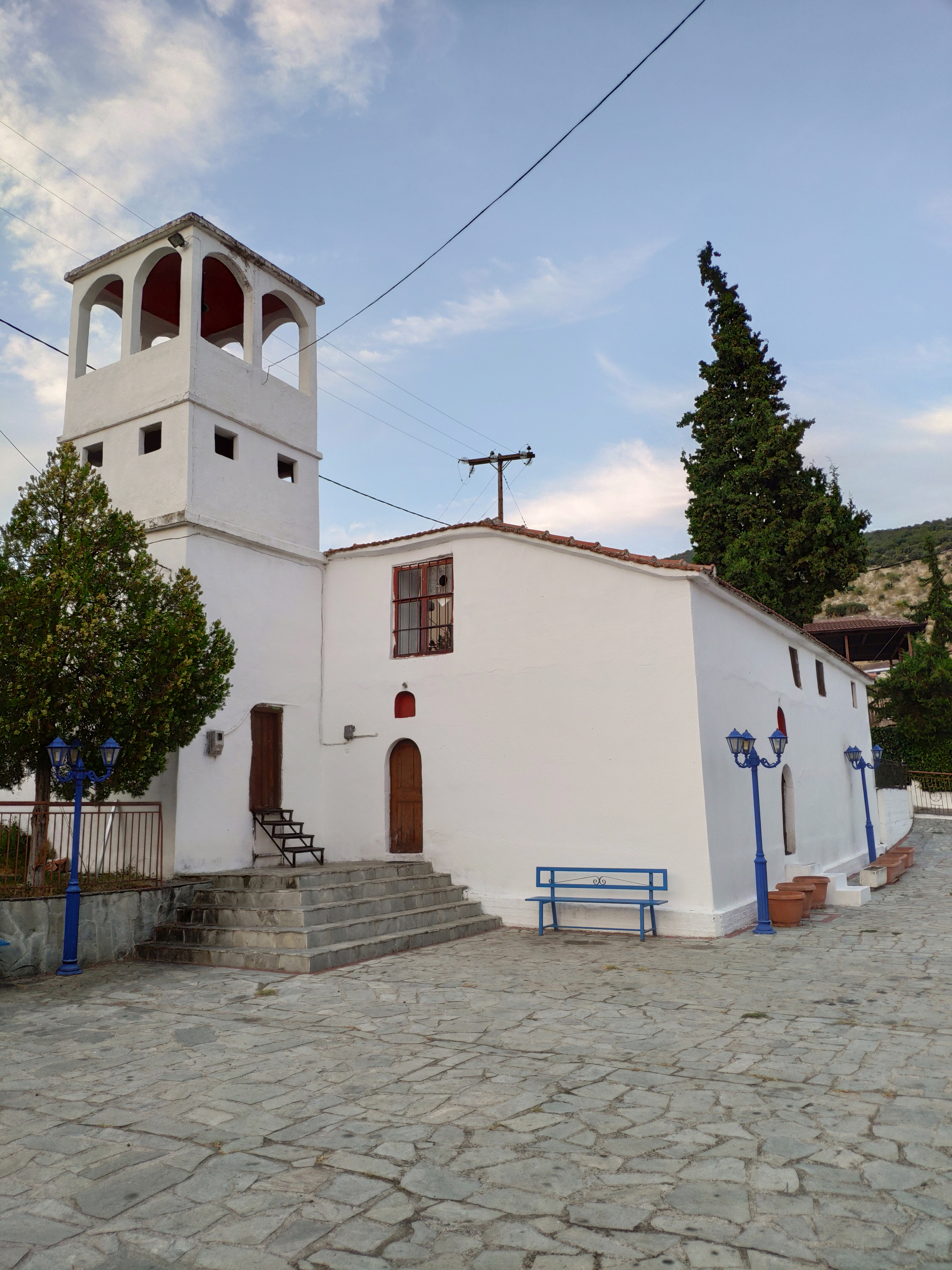
The Church of Ascension of the Savior (1800) today.

During the Ottoman period, Theodorakeio was administratively part of the kaza of Giannitsa and ecclesiastically under the jurisdiction of the Metropolis of Moglena. It was known as Toudortsi, and its inhabitants were Greek Slavophones. Despite the predominantly Muslim environment of the region and repeated Ottoman efforts at Islamization - including the burning of the Church of Saint Athanasios, located in the village cemetery - the settlement consistently remained Christian. Consequently, the inhabitants constructed a new church, the Church of the Ascension of the Savior, in 1800. Many residents of Toudortsi participated in the Greek War of Independence, in 1821, joining the armed band of Angelis Gatsos, which fought, among other locations, in the Peloponnese.

The Ottomans burned the village church twice more, in 1850 and 1875; nevertheless, the inhabitants succeeded in preserving and restoring it through the collective efforts of all village families. The large icons of the carved wooden iconostasis were painted in 1878 by the painter Emmanouil Stamatiadis from Giannitsa, while the smaller, folk-style icons were transferred by residents from the neighboring village of Papasio. The wall paintings were executed by a monk from Mount Athos, who also decorated the wooden balustrade of the women’s gallery with scenes from the twenty-four oikoi of the Akathist Hymn. A significant number of icons dating to the 18th century have also been preserved. In parallel, the priest from Toudortsi Bozinos Gerakaris (1845–1906), a graduate of the renowned Athonite Academy, enriched the church with numerous books, which he purchased from Greek printing houses in Venice. As a result, the village remained largely unaffected by the ethno-religious propaganda that prevailed in Macedonia during that period.

During the Macedonian Struggle, many inhabitants of Toudortsi took part in the conflict in support of the Greek cause, with the most prominent figure being the armed leader Athanasios Sortsis (1873–1953), who was highly honored by the Greek state for his actions following liberation. Nevertheless, some families aligned themselves with the Bulgarian Exarchate and subsequently emigrated to Bulgaria. Toudortsi was liberated in 1913, in the context of the First Balkan War. According to the census of that year, it had a population of 436 inhabitants; this number rose to 484 in 1928 and to 651 in 1940. In 1925, the village was officially renamed "Theodoraki". During the period of German occupation in World War II, the inhabitants of Theodorakeio suffered both from Nazi forces and from Bulgarian raiders, who carried out acts of destruction and arbitrary executions.

In field research conducted in 1993 by the anthropologist Riki Van Boeschoten, the inhabitants of Theodorakeio were found to have preserved the Macedonian language to a high degree. The language was used by people of all age groups in both public and private settings; the researcher also notes that some elderly residents possessed only limited knowledge of Greek.

Today, Theodorakeio is home to cultural and educational associations aimed at preserving and promoting local folklore and cultural heritage. The inhabitants actively contribute to the maintenance and enhancement of the local natural environment, while the village has retained its traditional architectural character, featuring vernacular houses, narrow lanes, kafenios, and taverns. The central square is adorned with a memorial dedicated to residents who lost their lives in various wars, as well as a tall elm tree that provides shade and contributes to the landscape’s ambience. The village is equipped with a nursery school, kindergarten, primary school, children’s playground, basketball and football courts, and a rural medical clinic.
