= Voreino =

Voreino Βορεινό
- Community
- Location within Greece
- Coordinates: 41°02′N 22°05′E
- Country: Greece
- Administrative region: Central Macedonia
- Regional unit: Pella
- Municipality: Almopia
- Municipal unit: Aridaia

Population (2021)
  - Community: 988
- Time zone: UTC+2 (EET)
  - Summer (DST): UTC+3 (EEST)

Voreino (Greek: Βορεινό, Macedonian and Bulgarian: Сборско, Sborsko) is a village and a community in the Pella regional unit, northern Greece. The community consists of the villages Voreino, Neochori and Pefkoto. It is situated near Aridaia at the foot of the Voras Mountains. In the local Slavic dialect, Pefkoto was known as Sborsko.

== History ==
A demographic survey of the population of the village, done in 1873, recorded the village as having 212 households with 1346 male Bulgarian Christian residents.
