= Milea, Pella =

Milea Μηλέα
- Community
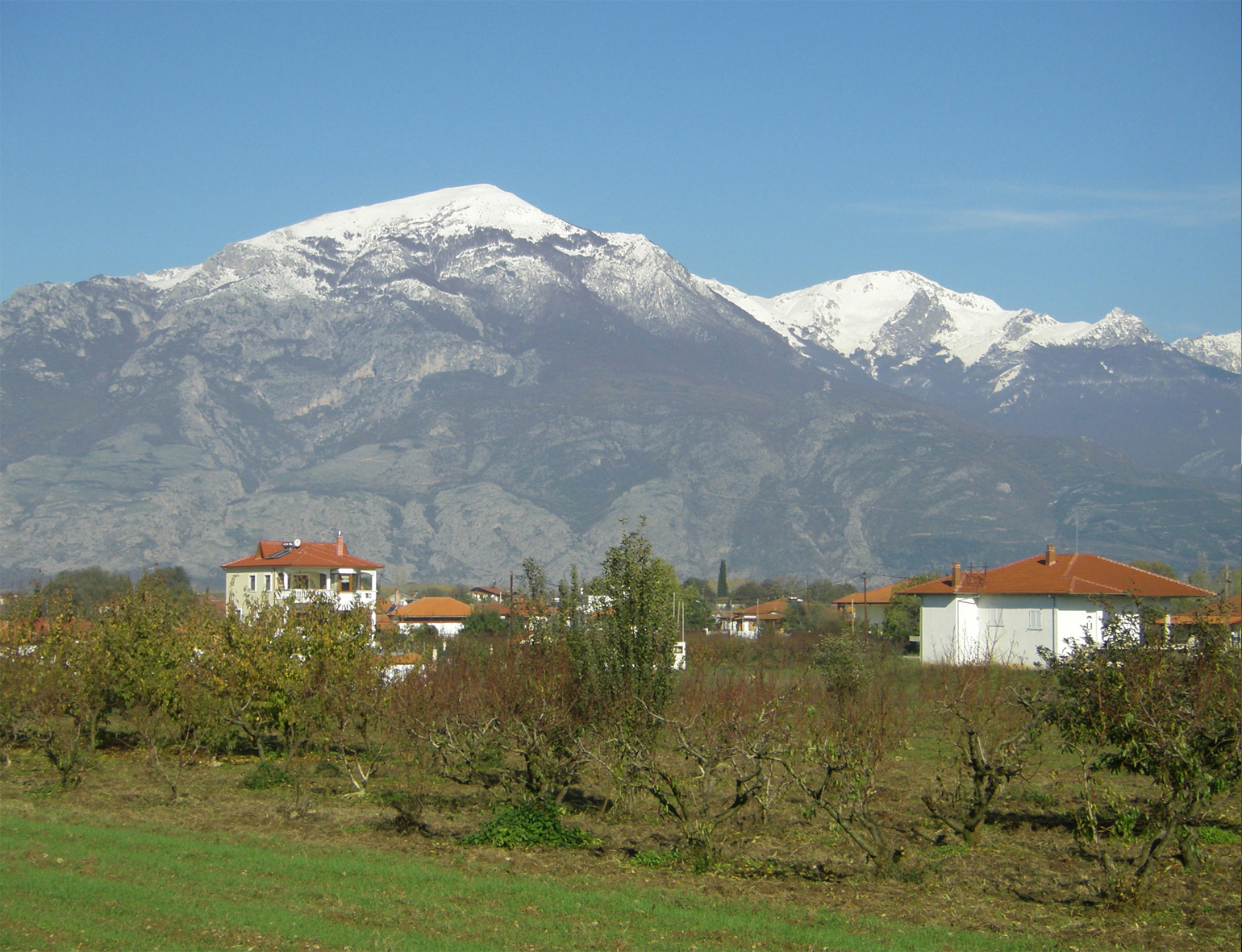
- Milea landscape with Kozhuh mountain in the background

- Location within Greece
- Coordinates: 40°59′31″N 22°8′41″E
- Country: Greece
- Geographic region: Macedonia
- Administrative region: Central Macedonia
- Regional unit: Pella
- Municipality: Almopia
- Municipal unit: Exaplatanos

Population (2021)
  - Community: 837
- Time zone: UTC+2 (EET)
  - Summer (DST): UTC+3 (EEST)

Milea (Greek: Μηλέα, before 1926: Καρλάτ – Karlat; Macedonian and Bulgarian: Карладово, Karladovo; Turkish: Karladova or Kırlat) is a village in the Exaplatanos municipal unit of the Pella regional unit of Macedonia, Greece. The community of Milea, which includes the neighboring village Rizochori, has a population of 837 (2021).

Milea had 787 inhabitants in 1981. In fieldwork done by anthropologist Riki Van Boeschoten in late 1993, Milea was populated by a Greek population descended from Anatolian Greek refugees who arrived during the Greek–Turkish population exchange, and Slavophones. The Macedonian language was spoken in the village by people over 30 in public and private settings. Children understood the language, but mostly did not use it. Turkish was spoken in the village by people over 30 in public and private settings. Children understood the language, but mostly did not use it.
