= Konstantia =

Konstantia Κωνσταντία
- Community
- Location within Greece
- Coordinates: 40°59′55″N 22°10′20″E
- Country: Greece
- Administrative region: Central Macedonia
- Regional unit: Pella
- Municipality: Almopia
- Municipal unit: Exaplatanos

Population (2021)
  - Community: 514
- Time zone: UTC+2 (EET)
  - Summer (DST): UTC+3 (EEST)

Konstantia (Greek: Κωνσταντία; Bulgarian: Гостолюби, Gostolyubi, Turkish: Gustulüp) is a village in the Exaplatanos municipal unit of the Pella regional unit of Macedonia, Greece. It lies on the road to Foustani at an altitude of 180 meters.

== History ==
=== Ancient history ===
In 1995 and 2000, a tumulus cemetery was discovered and excavated at the site of Xerika, south of the community, Almopia province, Pella. The cemetery is located at the foot of the western Paiko, at the beginning of the shortest ancient road connecting the Almopia region with Bottiaea (today's Municipality of Pella). Based on the finds, it dates to the Iron Age and its use extends to the 7th century BC. 40 tumuli were counted along a torrential stream, with a direction of A-N. The tumuli have a diameter of 8-14 m, except for two elongated ones, which measured 20x8 m and 17x11 m respectively.

They were stone mounds, which were defined by larger rough stones on their periphery. They covered and surrounded a single-chambered chamber, made of large rough stones, which had been worked on its inner side and had a smooth surface. Always to the east, two of the stones, placed transversely, protruded in height and formed the doorposts of the entrance, while the floor had a layer of small pebbles. In a few cases, a slab-shaped stone was also found between the doorposts, as a symbolic entrance barrier.

The chambers and the roads, as well as the tumuli, had fluctuating dimensions (the largest examples had a chamber diameter of 3.00 m) and an evolution in shape, from circular to more rectangular examples. The covering of the graves must have been done in a pseudo-vaulted manner, as shown by the only intact grave, which had also received repeated burials. The lack of lintels at the entrances and the low height of the chambers (1-1.5 m) shows that the formation of the road and entrance had only a symbolic character and for each new burial the cover of the grave was removed.

The repeated uses of the chambers were mainly confirmed by the excavation of the only intact grave in tumulus 2, which had internal dimensions of 2.20x 1.50 m. In the chamber of the tomb, ten human skulls and many grave goods were counted (their number approaches 100), such as clay vessels (diameters with knobs on the handles, fluted cantharos, jugs, phials), spindle whorls or beads, iron knives and jewelry (stone or glass beads, earrings, bracelets, circular pendant, eight-shaped shoulder and head clasps, one arched clasp in the tradition of the islands).

The finds from the other tumuli allow a broad dating of the use of the cemetery throughout the Iron Age and up to the 7th century BC. The study of the material and the continuation of the excavation of the cemetery in the few remaining intact tumuli will perhaps allow the extension of the boundaries of the cemetery upwards and downwards, in order to gather more information about the Almopes and mainly in relation to Thucydides' information about their expulsion from the area after the arrival of the Macedonians, an event that is placed by research in the 6th century BC.

=== Modern history and population ===
During the Ottoman period, the village was called Kosteloyp and was renamed Konstantia in 1925. It was a purely Muslim village until 1920 with 2 mosques (one of which was temporarily converted into a Christian church after 1930) and 1197 inhabitants who were engaged in agriculture and livestock farming. After the 1923 population exchange between Greece and Turkey, Greek refugees from Asia Minor settled in the area.

The refugees that came with the exchange to the village are mainly inhabitants from Pontus and more specific from the region of Kotyora. The rest are from Trabzon, Gialvalides from the region of Yalova, Tsoromlides from the region Çorum (Çoch oyroym = a lot of Greek) near Ankara and Achmetlides from the region Achmeten (Ak-ntag-meten = mine) also near Ankara. The refugees brought with them grails and pictures that are still saved in the village church.

The village of Konstantia had a dramatic role from the beginning of World War II until the end of Greek Civil War. Fifty five men, women and children lost their life. In 1947 the village was a victim of the civil war ferocity. On 10 February, 33 people were killed during an attack from Dimokratikos Stratos Elladas. Many houses were also set of fire.

=== Administration history ===
Administrative changes from 1918 to 2006:

09/07/1918 - Founding of Kosteloup community. Kosteloup settlement set as community seat.
09/07/1918 - Prodromos settlement is merged with Kosteloup community.
09/07/1918 - Noboseltsi settlement is merged with Kosteloup community.
14/04/1919 - Noboseltsi settlement is extracted from the Kosteloup community and becomes seat of Noboseltsi community.
14/04/1919 - Prodromos settlement is extracted from the Kosteloup community and gets merged with the Noboseltsi community.
24/07/1924 - Muslims were exchanged from Kosteloup to Turkey.
13/06/1925 - Kosteloup settlement of Kosteloup community is renamed to Konstanteia.
13/06/1925 - Kosteloup community is renamed to Konstanteia's community.
16/10/1940 - Name of Konstanteia settlement of Konstanteia's community is corrected to Konstantia.
16/10/1940 - Name of Konstanteia's community is corrected to Konstantias community.
04/12/1997 - Community of Konstantia is suppressed to Municipality of Exaplatanos (Program I. Kapodistrias).
