= Xifiani =

- Community
- Location within Greece
- Coordinates: 40°55′48″N 22°4′50″E
- Country: Greece
- Geographic region: Macedonia
- Administrative region: Central Macedonia
- Regional unit: Pella
- Municipality: Almopia
- Municipal unit: Aridaia

Population (2021)
  - Community: 628
- Time zone: UTC+2 (EET)
  - Summer (DST): UTC+3 (EEST)

Xifiani (Greek: Ξιφιανή, before 1922: Κωστούργιαννη – Kostourgianni, between 1922 and 1953: Ξυφώνια – Xyfoneia Macedonian:Костурени) is a village in Pella regional unit, Macedonia, Greece.

After the village became part of Greece, its mosque was turned into the church of Agios Polykarpos.

Xifiani had 923 inhabitants in 1981. In fieldwork done by anthropologist Riki Van Boeschoten in late 1993, Xifiani was populated by Slavophones and a Greek population descended from Anatolian Greek refugees who arrived during the Greek–Turkish population exchange. The Macedonian language was spoken in the village by people over 30 in public and private settings. Children understood the language, but mostly did not use it. Pontic Greek was spoken in the village by people over 30 in public and private settings. Children understood the language, but mostly did not use it.
