= Polykarpi, Pella =

Polykarpi
- Community
- Location within Greece
- Coordinates: 40°55′34″N 22°0′59″E
- Country: Greece
- Geographic region: Macedonia
- Administrative region: Central Macedonia
- Regional unit: Pella
- Municipality: Almopia
- Municipal unit: Aridaia

Population (2021)
  - Community: 868
- Time zone: UTC+2 (EET)
  - Summer (DST): UTC+3 (EEST)

Polykarpi (Greek: Πολυκάρπι, before 1925: Πόλιανη – Poliani) is a village in Pella regional unit, Macedonia, Greece.

Polykarpi had 1046 inhabitants in 1981. In fieldwork done by anthropologist Riki Van Boeschoten in late 1993, Polykarpi was populated by a Greek population descended from Anatolian Greek refugees who arrived during the Greek–Turkish population exchange. Turkish was spoken in the village by people over 30 in public and private settings. Children understood the language, but mostly did not use it.
