= Filoteia =

Filoteia Φιλώτεια
- Community
- Location within Greece
- Coordinates: 41°2′4″N 22°9′8″E
- Country: Greece
- Geographic region: Macedonia
- Administrative region: Central Macedonia
- Regional unit: Pella
- Municipality: Almopia
- Municipal unit: Exaplatanos

Population (2021)
  - Community: 421
- Time zone: UTC+2 (EET)
  - Summer (DST): UTC+3 (EEST)

Filoteia (Greek: Φιλώτεια, before 1922: Κουζούσιανη – Kouzousiani) is a village in Pella regional unit, Macedonia, Greece.

Filoteia had 647 inhabitants in 1981. In fieldwork done by anthropologist Riki Van Boeschoten in late 1993, Filoteia was populated by Slavophones and a Greek population descended from Anatolian Greek refugees who arrived during the Greek–Turkish population exchange. The Macedonian language was spoken by people over 60, mainly in private. A mosque used to exist in the village, later destroyed.
