= Sosandra =

- Community
- Location within Greece
- Coordinates: 40°59′56″N 22°1′57″E
- Country: Greece
- Geographic region: Macedonia
- Administrative region: Central Macedonia
- Regional unit: Pella
- Municipality: Almopia
- Municipal unit: Aridaia

Population (2021)
  - Community: 1,008
- Time zone: UTC+2 (EET)
  - Summer (DST): UTC+3 (EEST)

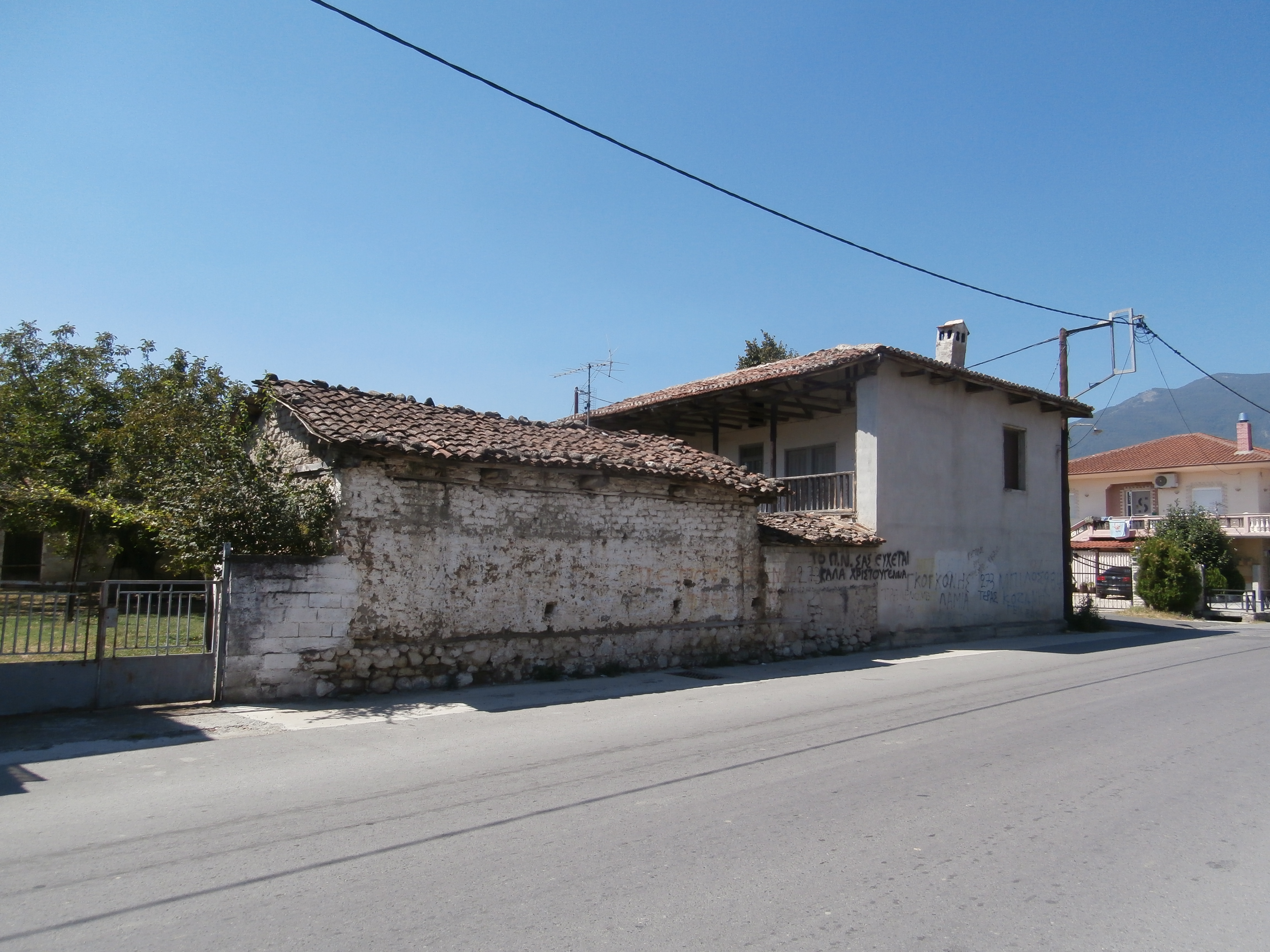
A traditional house in Sosandra, Almopia

Sosandra (Greek: Σωσάνδρα, before 1922: Πρεμπόδιστα – Prempodista) is a village in Pella regional unit, Macedonia, Greece.

Sosandra had 1291 inhabitants in 1981. In fieldwork done by anthropologist Riki Van Boeschoten in late 1993, Sosandra was populated by Slavophones and a Greek population descended from Anatolian Greek refugees who arrived during the Greek–Turkish population exchange. The Macedonian language was spoken in the village by people over 30 in public and private settings. Children understood the language, but mostly did not use it.
