= Foustani =

Village in Greece

Foustani Φούστανη
- Community
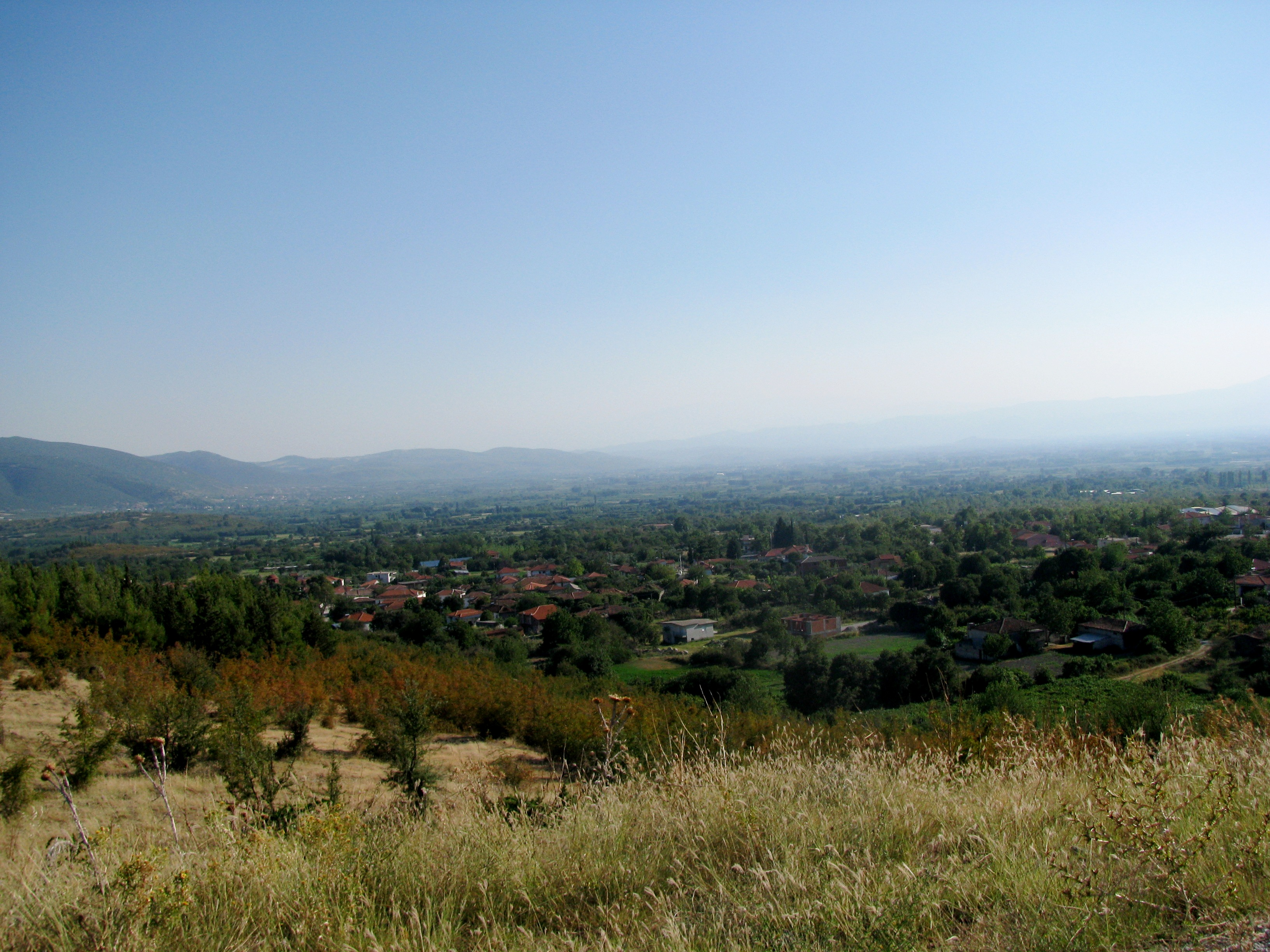
- View of Foustani

- Location within Greece
- Coordinates: 41°3′18″N 22°10′35″E
- Country: Greece
- Geographic region: Macedonia
- Administrative region: Central Macedonia
- Regional unit: Pella
- Municipality: Almopia
- Municipal unit: Exaplatanos
- Highest elevation: 280 m (920 ft)

Population (2021)
  - Community: 333
- Time zone: UTC+2 (EET)
  - Summer (DST): UTC+3 (EEST)
- Postal code: 58003

Foustani (Greek: Φούστανη; Macedonian: Фуштани, Fuštani) is a village in the municipality Almopia, Pella regional unit, northern Greece. According to the 2021 census, the village has a population of 333 people.

Foustani had 651 inhabitants in 1981. In fieldwork done by anthropologist Riki Van Boeschoten in late 1993, Foustani was populated by a Greek population descended from Anatolian Greek refugees who arrived during the Greek–Turkish population exchange, and Slavophones. The Macedonian language was spoken in the village by people over 30 in public and private settings. Children understood the language, but mostly did not use it. Turkish was possibly spoken by people over 60, mainly in private.

The refugees replaced the Pomaks who left the village in 1923 as part of the population exchange between Greece and Turkey.

A mosque located near the main present church used to exist in the village, later destroyed.
