= Axos, Pella =

Axos Αξός
- Community
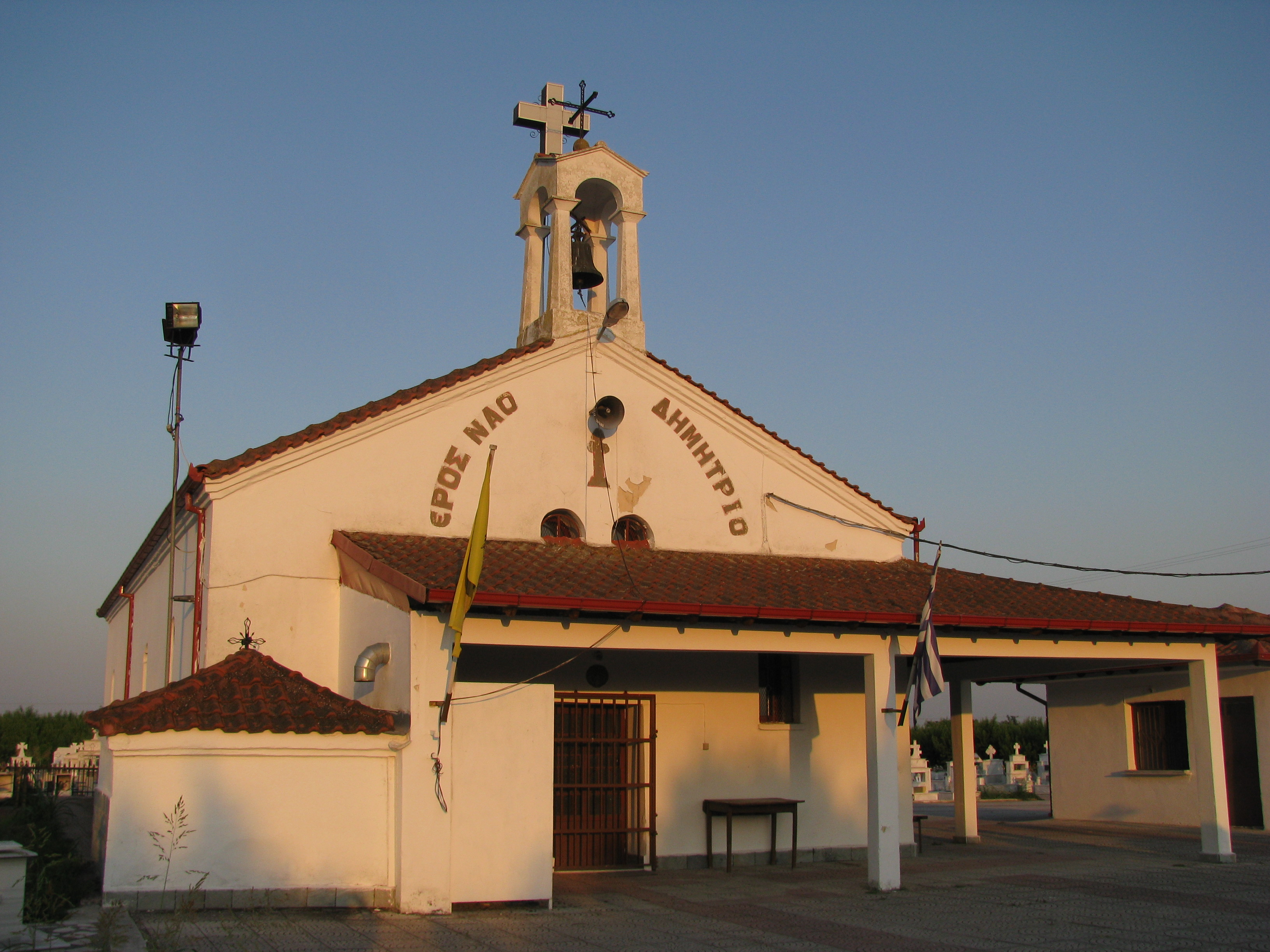
- Church between Axos and Pontochori

- Location within Greece
- Coordinates: 40°48′04″N 22°21′47″E
- Country: Greece
- Administrative region: Central Macedonia
- Regional unit: Pella
- Municipality: Pella
- Municipal unit: Kyrros

Population (2021)
  - Community: 1,055
- Time zone: UTC+2 (EET)
  - Summer (DST): UTC+3 (EEST)

Axos (Greek: Αξός) is a village in the municipal unit Kyrros, Pella regional unit, Central Macedonia, Greece, 4 km from the city of Giannitsa and 52 km from Thessaloniki. The village is home to the football club Niki Axou. From Axos originates the footballer Marios Nikolaidis.
