= Zervi =

Village in Vegoritida, Macedonia, Greece

Coordinates: 40°51′N 21°49′E

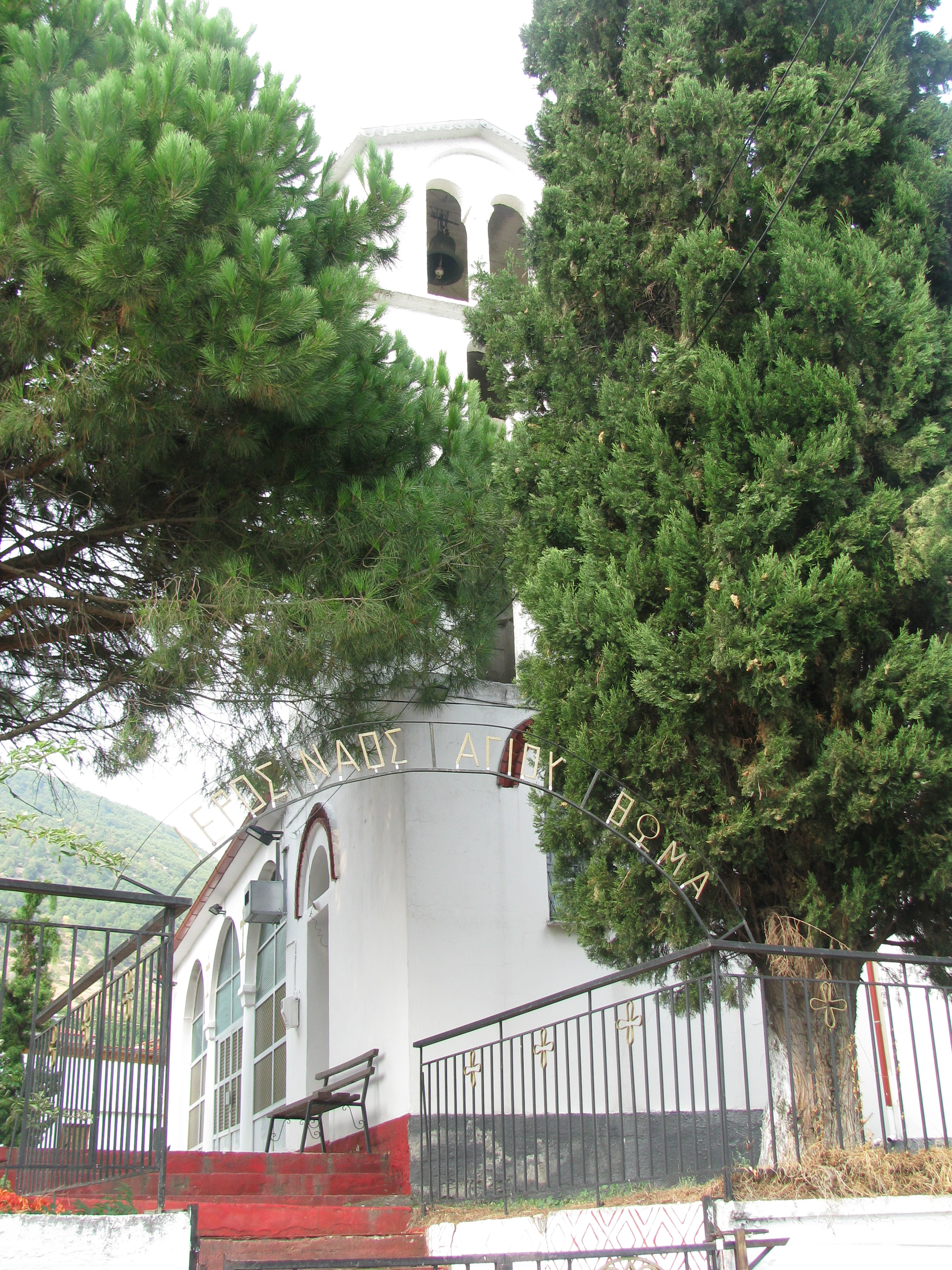
Zhervi church in Zervi cillage, Greece

Zervi (Greek: Ζέρβη, Macedonian Slavic/Bulgarian: Жерви, Žervi) is a small village in the municipal unit Vegoritida, Edessa municipality, western Pella regional unit, Macedonia, Greece. Its population was 720 in 2001.

== History ==
While much of the history of the village is lost, rumors say that it was built by Byzantine troops in order to defend Lake Vegoritida from attacking invaders coming from the north.

== Economy ==
The village produces large amounts of cherries, apples and peaches every summer.

=== Tourism ===
Right above this village is located Kaimaktsalan - Vorras ski resort which is tree free alpine. There are a lot of visitors for climbing, skiing, etc. The location (Kerasies) is the take off location for hanggliding and paragliders. Many local, National and occasionally International championships host there. 1km south of village is Edessas Gliding Club private airfield where visitors can try local flights with gliders and ultralight planes.

== Cultural Events ==
On 25 and 26 July there are evening celebrations highlighting traditional music and dance. On 24 December, the village holds a bonfire to celebrate the birth of Jesus Christ. Tradition holds that the fire is intended to provide warmth for the newborn baby. The celebration also features music and free food and drink (wine and local tsipouro) for everyone. A similar celebration is held on 31 December, and 6 January.
