= Orma, Pella =

Orma
- Community
- Location within Greece
- Coordinates: 40°57′5″N 21°55′34″E
- Country: Greece
- Geographic region: Macedonia
- Administrative region: Central Macedonia
- Regional unit: Pella
- Municipality: Almopia
- Municipal unit: Aridaia

Population (2021)
  - Community: 532
- Time zone: UTC+2 (EET)
  - Summer (DST): UTC+3 (EEST)

Orma (Greek: Όρμα, before 1925: Τρέσινον or Τρέσινο, according to Slavic Тресино) is a village in Pella regional unit, Macedonia, Greece. Its population was 1521 as of the 2021 census.

Orma is located at the foot of Mount Voras or Kajmakčalan, on Greece's border with North Macedonia near Loutra Pozar. It was once called Trésino (Тресино). According to one source, the name of the village derives from an ancient Macedonian city of the same name located in the larger area; another states that it derives from the waters of the river that flowed wildly through the mountain.

Orma is the second most popular tourist destination in Almopia, and is surrounded by greenery and natural waters. Cherries, chestnuts, clams and peaches are produced in the area. The village church is dedicated to Agios Nikolaos (Saint Nicholas) but celebrates on the day of saint Nestor of Thessaloniki on 27 October.

From Orma came the fighters who followed Aggelis Gatsos in the fight of 1821, Macedonian fighters and also people who were killed in the battles of the civil war. In June 1908 the village was almost completely destroyed by an attack by the Bulgarian commissioners. After World War II and the Greek Civil War, many residents of Orma moved to Edessa.

== Transport ==
Loutraki is served by Pella Provincial Road 2, from Skydra and Aridaia.
