= Promachoi =

- Community
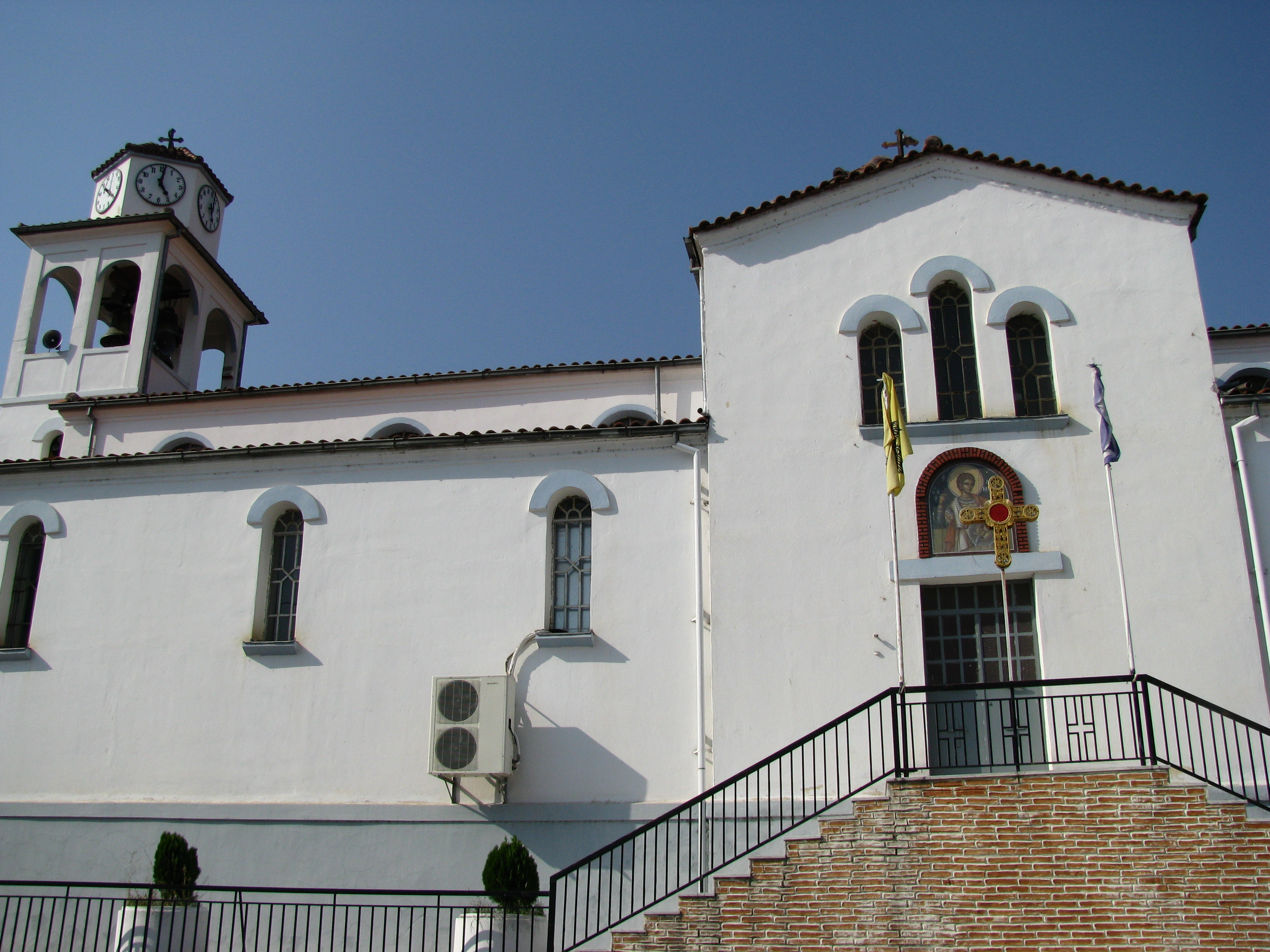
- Church in Promachoi

- Location within Greece
- Coordinates: 41°1′31″N 22°0′16″E
- Country: Greece
- Geographic region: Macedonia
- Administrative region: Central Macedonia
- Regional unit: Pella
- Municipality: Almopia
- Municipal unit: Aridaia

Population (2021)
  - Community: 1,654
- Time zone: UTC+2 (EET)
  - Summer (DST): UTC+3 (EEST)

Promachoi (Greek: Πρόμαχοι, before 1926: Μπάχοβο – Bachovo Macedonian: Баово) is a village in Pella regional unit, Macedonia, Greece.

Promachoi had 1754 inhabitants in 1981. In fieldwork done by anthropologist Riki Van Boeschoten in late 1993, Promachoi was populated by Slavophones. The Macedonian language was spoken in the village by people over 30 in public and private settings. Children understood the language, but mostly did not use it.
