= Horma (Almopia) =

Horma (Ancient Greek: Ὅρμα) was a town of Almopia in ancient Macedonia.

The site of Horma is unlocated.
