= Sotira, Pella =

Sotira Σωτήρα
- Community
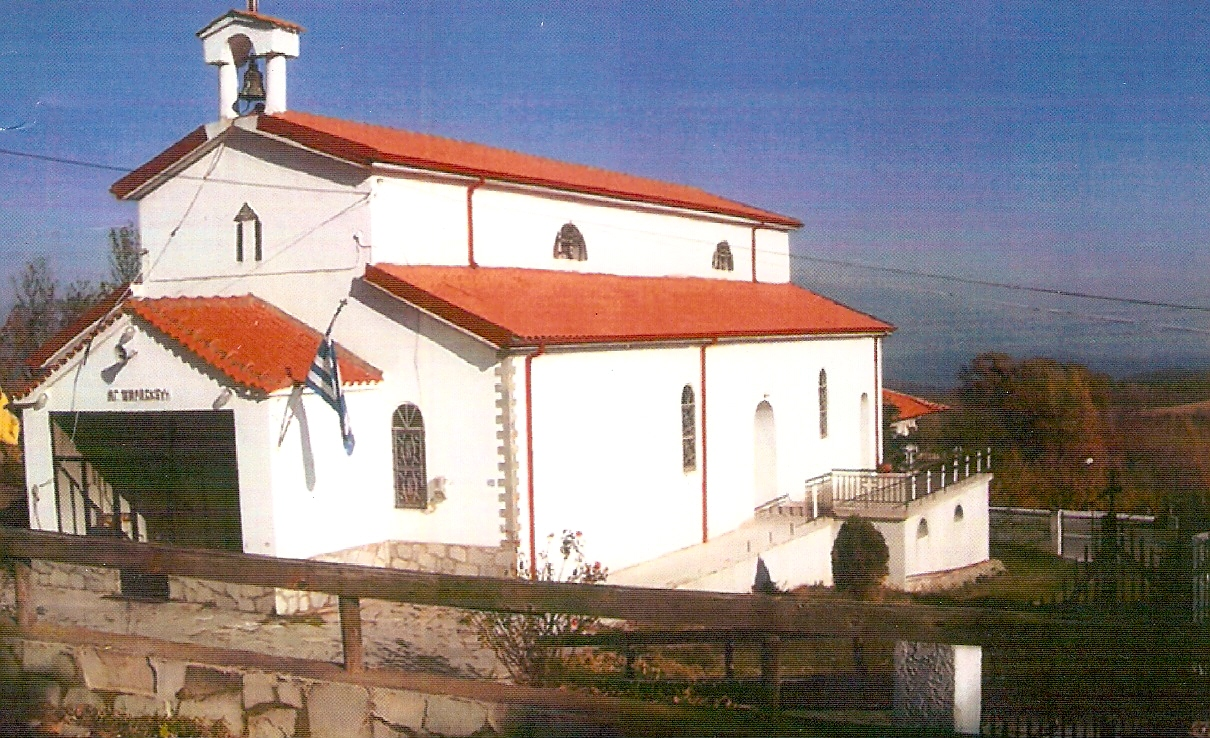
- Sotira, Pella – the Orthodox church of the village

- Location within Greece
- Coordinates: 40°51′27″N 22°02′42″E
- Country: Greece
- Administrative region: Central Macedonia
- Regional unit: Pella
- Municipality: Edessa
- Municipal unit: Edessa

Population (2021)
  - Community: 458
- Time zone: UTC+2 (EET)
  - Summer (DST): UTC+3 (EEST)

Sotira (Greek: Σωτήρα, is a community of the municipality of Edessa in Pella regional unit, Greece. It is situated in the north of the city of Edessa, at the edges of Mount Borras (Kaimaktsalan).

Its permanent indigenous population is estimated at up to two hundred (200) inhabitants, who are usually working as farmers or cattle-breeders. The village, mainly because of its suitability of climate, was chosen as the perfect place to locate a mountain campsite, later known as "Sotira's campsite". The wider area where the village is situated is said to have been inhabited since the early Greek history, based on archeological finds (of human remains and items of jewellery) discovered round about, reckoned to originate from both the time of Alexander the Great and the Ottoman rule.

== Tradition and history ==
According to the tradition of the village, and confirmed by the above-mentioned archeological finds, the village was originally located 800 meters east of its current location, on a site called Topolite, which, however, was abandoned by the ancestors of the villagers because (according to the tradition) an army of ants was destroying their field crops and greens. As a result, they moved and built a whole new settlement on a new site near the current Campsite. The former site is still known as "Old Sotira" or "Old Loukovits". According to the tradition, though, as they often heard peals and loud noises deriving from a nearby spring, that still exists, and indeed people died once they heard those strange noises, they also abandoned that area and settled, about five hundred years ago, at the site where the current village is located and built their settlement on the ruins of an older former village. However, as the death rate continued to raise, they decided to adjure the evil eye by putting two twin boys' yoke two twin oxen and plow the village perimetrically. Since then, according to the legend, they released from the fetishisms and the superstitions.

Consequently, as they were at last safe and had been "rescued", they decided to name their new village Sotira (Greek: Σωτήρα, from the Greek word "Σωτηρία"(sotiria) which means "rescue", σωτηρία = rescue or salvation. In honor of that day, (it was 2 May) they held a local fair every year and celebrate their rescue from the evil.

== The church of the Village ==
In the center of the village, right next to the Huge old Plane, the ancestors of the inhabitants, built their church, dedicated to Saint Παρασκευή (=Friday) – holy protector of the village. This church was a marvelous miracle of architecture, but unfortunately it was demolished in the early sixties (1960') as a result of irreparable damages in its structure.
