= Apsalus =

Town in ancient Macedonia

Apsalus or Apsalos (Ancient Greek: Ἄψαλος) was a town of Almopia in ancient Macedonia.

The site of Apsalus is unlocated.
