= Aridaia =

Town in Macedonia, Greece

Aridaia Αριδαία
- Municipal unit
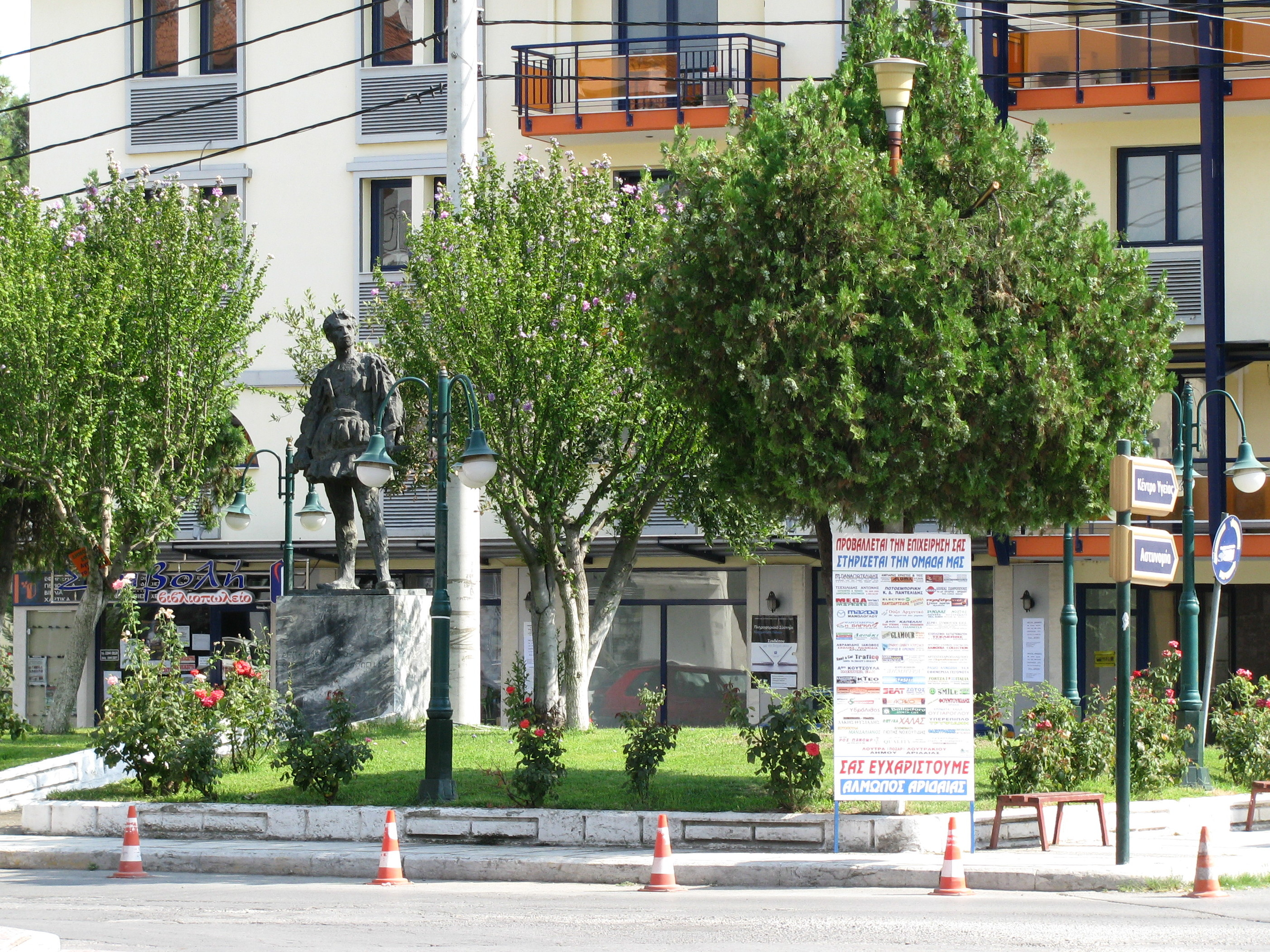
- View of the central square of Aridaia with Aggelis Gatsos' statue.

- Location within Greece
- Coordinates: 40°58′N 22°03′E
- Country: Greece
- Geographic region: Macedonia
- Administrative region: Central Macedonia
- Regional unit: Pella
- Municipality: Almopia
- Districts: 17

Area
  - Municipal unit: 562.91 km^{2} (217.34 sq mi)
- Elevation: 127 m (417 ft)

Population (2021)
  - Municipal unit: 18,864
  - Municipal unit density: 33.512/km^{2} (86.795/sq mi)
  - Community: 7,118
- Time zone: UTC+2 (EET)
  - Summer (DST): UTC+3 (EEST)
- Postal code: 584 00
- Area code: 23840-2
- Vehicle registration: ΕΕ
- Website: dimosalmopias.gov.gr

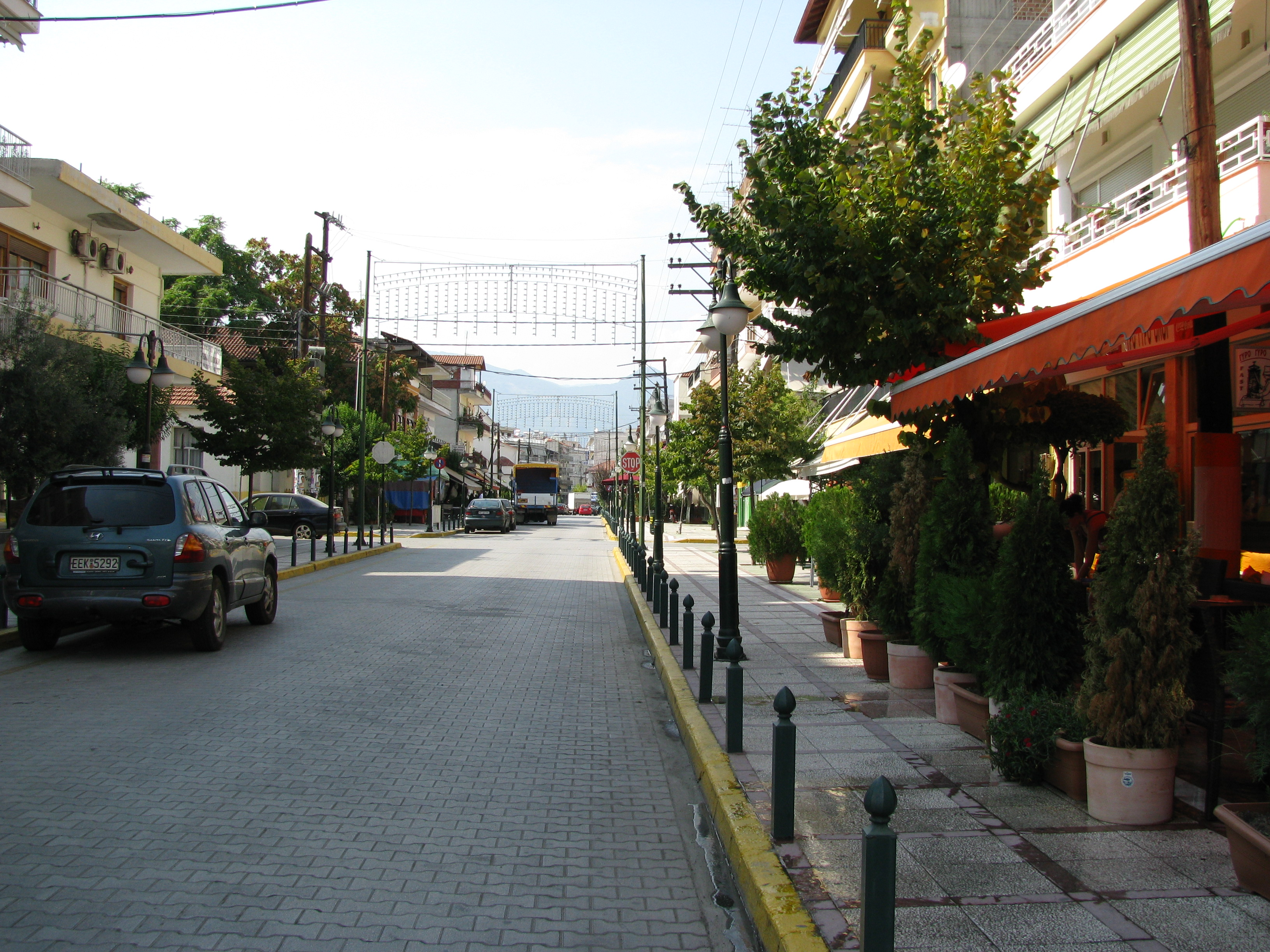
A street

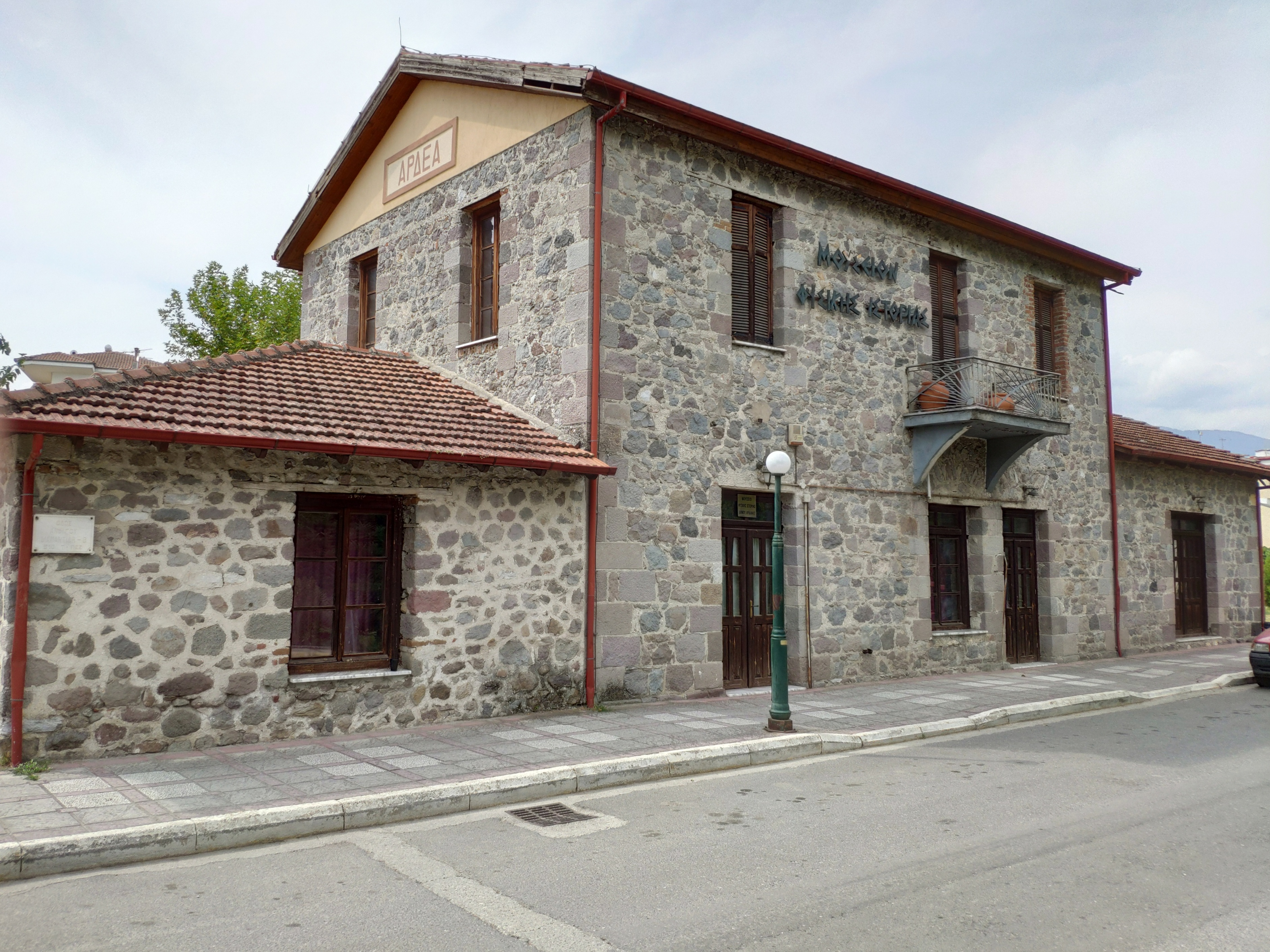
Old railway station (today a museum)

Aridaía (Greek: Αριδαία, Macedonian: С'ботско, Bulgarian: Съботско) is a town and a former municipality in the Pella regional unit, Greece. Since the 2011 local government reform, it is part of the Almopia municipality, of which it is a municipal unit. It was the capital of the former Almopia eparchy. It is located in the northwest corner of the Pella regional unit, bordering the southern part of North Macedonia and the northeast corner of the Florina regional unit. Its land area is 562.910 km^{2} (217.341 sq mi). The population of Aridaia proper is 7,118, while that of the entire municipal unit is 18,864 (2021 census). The municipal unit is divided into 17 communities. Its largest other communities are Prómachoi (pop. 1,654), Loutráki (1,176) and Sosándra (1,008).

The community of Aridaia includes the settlement of Ydraia with a population of 500 inhabitants.

A Greek battalion entered Aridaia on November 4, 1912, during the 1st Balkan War, and it started to develop as a town after the installment of Greek refugees from Asia Minor.

== Etymology ==
There are two possible etymologies of the name Aridaia. One is that "Aridaia" is a corruption of the old name of the town "Ardea", which comes from Greek: αρδεύω, lit. 'to irrigate', which is explained by the multiple rivers, streams, irrigation canals, etc. Another explanation is that the name comes from Philip III Arrhidaeus, half-brother of Alexander the Great. The town used to be called Ardéa (Αρδέα) until 24 April 1951 and even earlier Soúmboskon (Σούμποσκον) until 9 Juni 1922.

== Sights ==
At a distance of 7 km from Aridaia is the Byzantine Castle of Chrysi which dates back to the 8th century AD. North of Aridaia is a historic, though not very well known Monastery of the Province of Almopia, the Holy Monastery of Saint Hilarion, bishop of Moglena. This monastery has as its owner and founder Saint Hilarion himself, who was a great Hierarch of the Church of Greece in the 12th century, who lived and worked in the area of today's Almopia.

At a distance of 10 km from Aridaia are the Pozar Baths with impressive natural beauty and thermal waters. It is a tourist destination with many infrastructures and all the amenities in combination with the Kaimaktsalan Ski Center which geographically belongs to the Municipality of Almopia. Next to the tourist village of Loutraki, seat of Loutra Pozar, is the tourist village of Orma from which the road to the Ski Center starts.

== Sports ==
A well-known football team based in Aridaia is Almopos Arideas.

== Transport ==
=== Bus service ===
The KTEL station is located on Passia Street, on the road to Exaplatanos and Notia. The KTEL of Pella connects Aridaia locally with Edessa, with regular itineraries, and there are also routes to Athens, Skydra and Thessaloniki.

=== Rail service ===
The town does not have a railway station and is served by the railway stations of Edessa and Skydra, while in the period 1916-1936 there was a railway station, since there was a railway line from Skydra to Aridaia and Orma that closed in 1936. Railway Station, houses the Museum of Natural History. On February 19, 2019, the construction of the railway line Agios Athanasios – Chalkidona – Koufalia – Pella – Nea Pella – Giannitsa – Galatades – Karyotissa – Dafni – Kalivia – Skydra-Edessa and bypass from Skydra to Aridaia was announced, however no study has been presented, and it is currently unknown when the project will be completed.

=== Roads ===
There is no National Road passing through the town, but there are five provincial roads that connect Aridaia with the surrounding settlements. The following streets pass through the town:

1. Edessa – Apsalos – Aridaia. (Pella 1)
2. Aridaia – Exaplatanos to Skra and Axioupoli, Evropos Notia and Lagadia. (Pella 6)
3. Aridaia – Loutraki – Pozar Baths. (Pella 7)
4. Aridaia – Tsakona – Polykarpi. (Pella 8)
5. Aridaia – Sosandra – Promachos. (Pella 9)

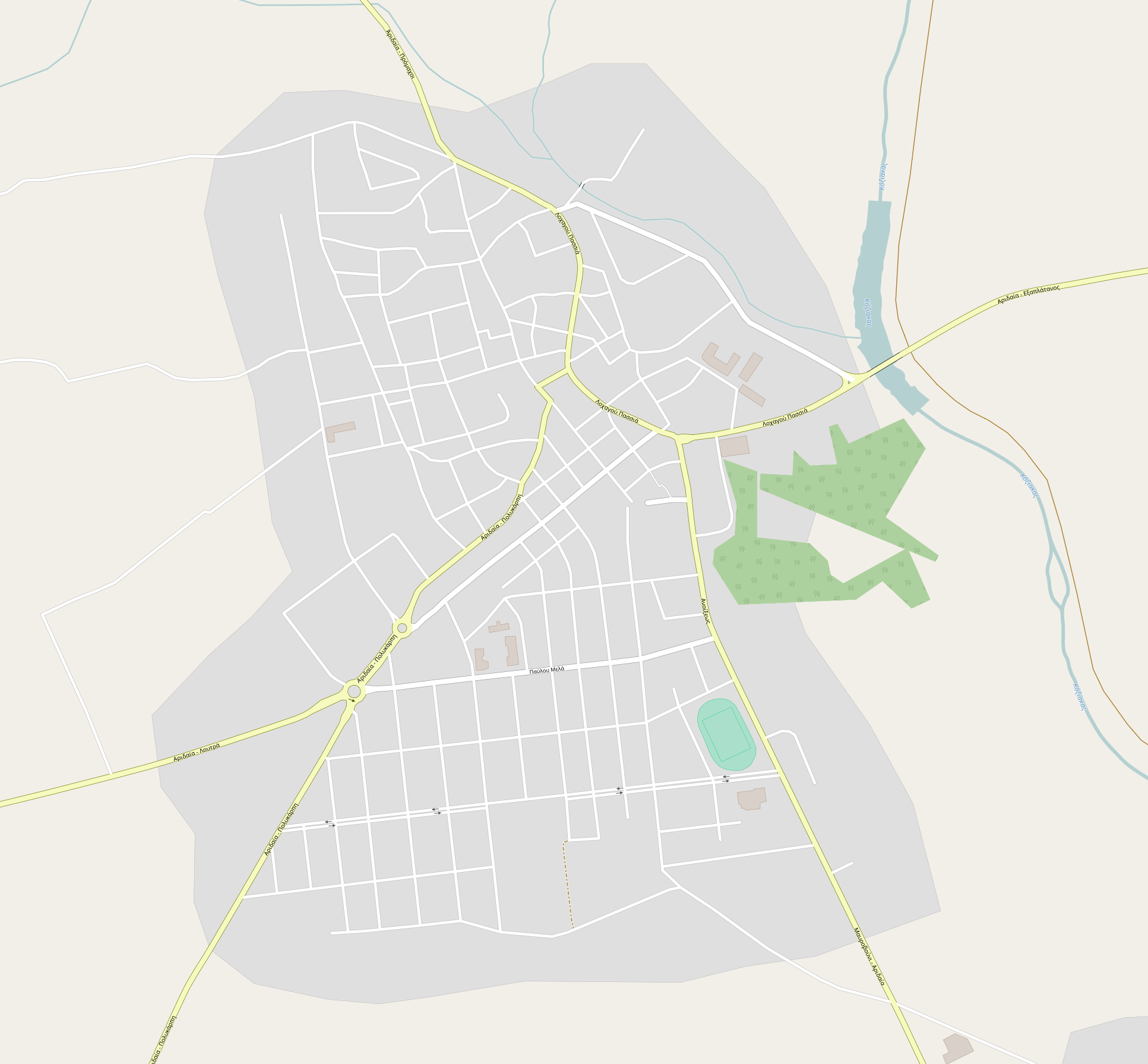
Map

=== Air service ===
In the Prefecture of Pella there is no airport, so Aridaia is served by the Airport "Macedonia" of Thessaloniki.

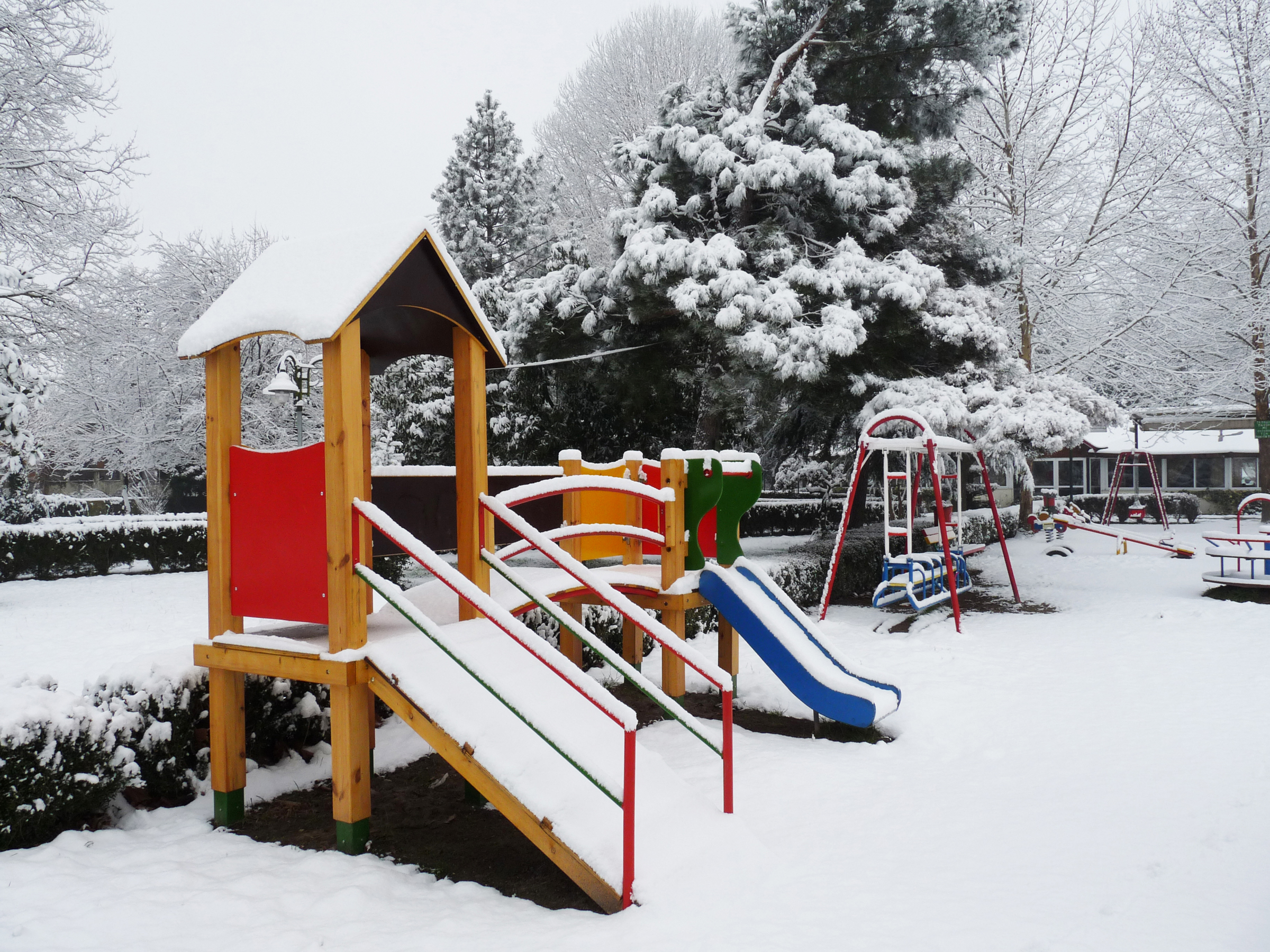
The park of Aridaia, Dasaki

== People from Aridaia ==
- Petros Dourdoumpakis, singer
- Haris Kostopoulos, singer
- Antonis Minou, football player
- Nikodim Tsarknias, priest of the Macedonian Orthodox Church
- Loukas Vyntra, Greek footballer
- Despina Zapounidou, Greek Olympic race walker
