= Exaplatanos =

Exaplatanos Εξαπλάτανος
- Municipal unit
- Location within the regional unit

- Location within Greece
- Coordinates: 40°59′N 22°07′E
- Country: Greece
- Administrative region: Central Macedonia
- Regional unit: Pella
- Municipality: Almopia

Area
  - Municipal unit: 422.9 km^{2} (163.3 sq mi)

Population (2021)
  - Municipal unit: 6,105
  - Municipal unit density: 14.44/km^{2} (37.39/sq mi)
  - Community: 1,080
- Time zone: UTC+2 (EET)
  - Summer (DST): UTC+3 (EEST)
- Vehicle registration: ΕΕ

Exaplatanos (Greek: Εξαπλάτανος; Macedonian: Капињани, Kapinjani; Turkish: Kapinyari) is a village and a former municipality in the Pella regional unit, Greece. Since the 2011 local government reform it is part of the municipality Almopia, of which it is a municipal unit. The municipal unit has an area of 422.907 km^{2}. Population 6,105 (2021). In 1912 the village numbered 1,315 residents exclusively Pomak Muslims.

One of the villages in this municipal unit is Archangelos (Megleno-Romanian: Ossiani).
