= Almopia =

Almopia Αλμωπία
- Municipality
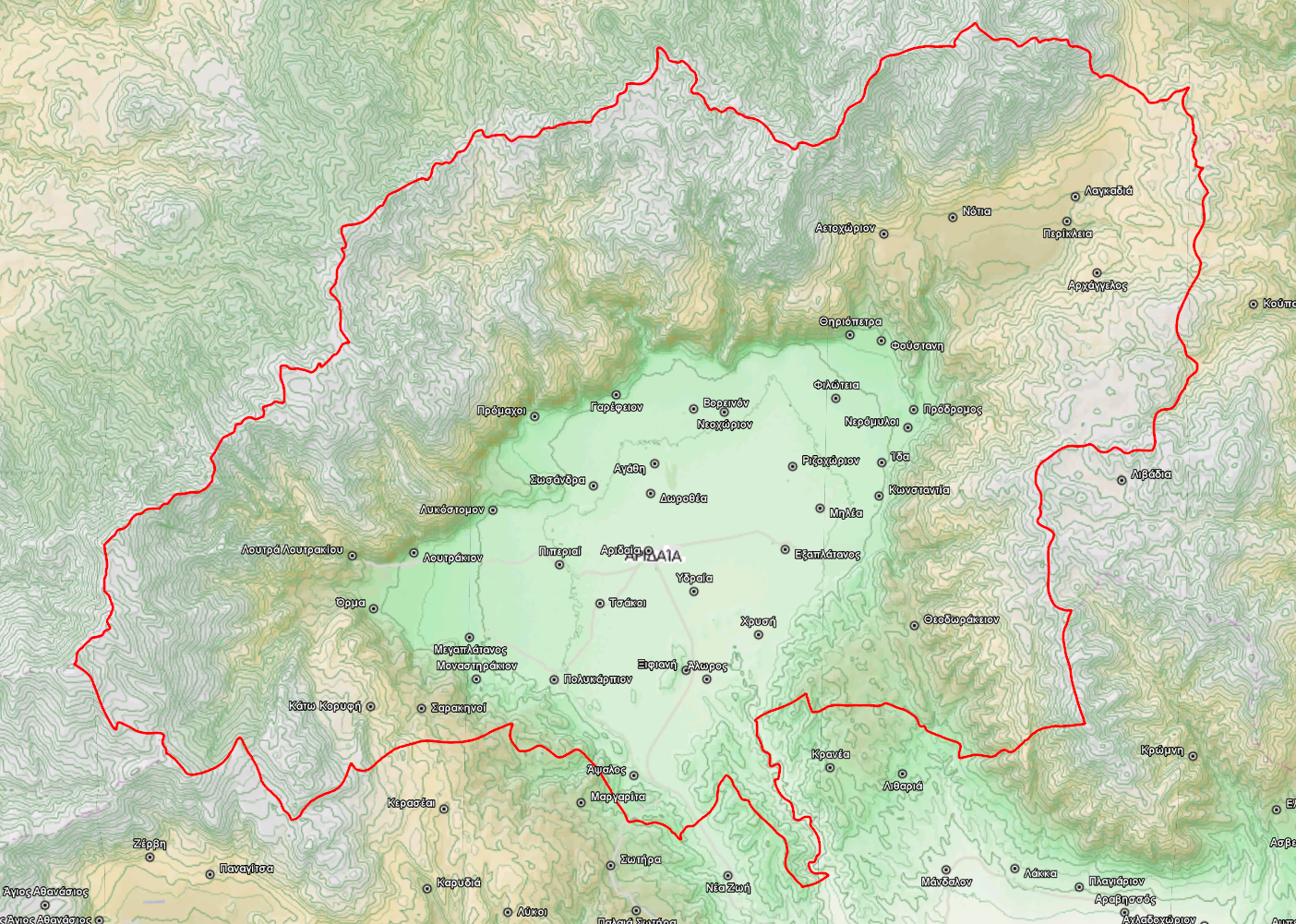

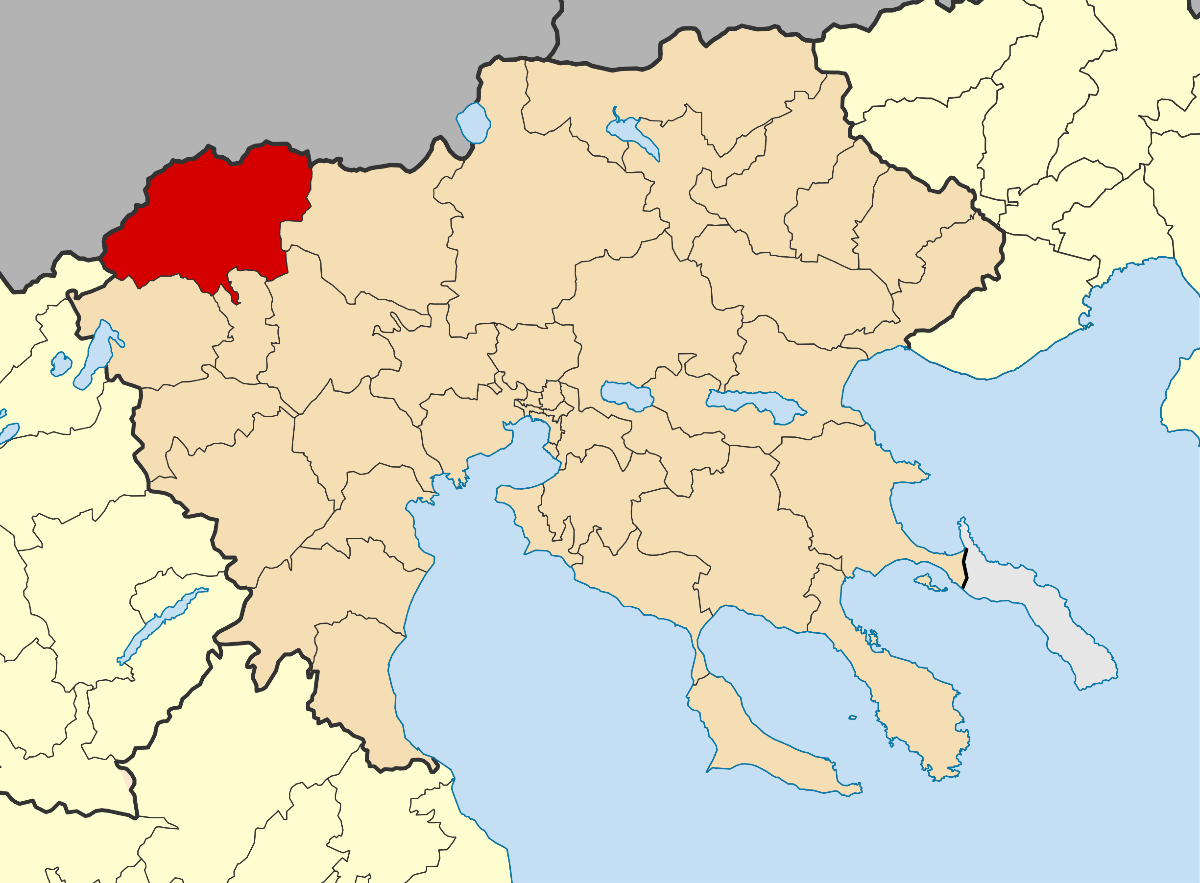

- Location within Greece
- Coordinates: 40°58′N 22°03′E
- Country: Greece
- Administrative region: Central Macedonia
- Regional unit: Pella
- Seat: Aridaia

Government
  - Mayor: Nikos Paroutoglou (since 2023)

Area
  - Municipality: 985.8 km^{2} (380.6 sq mi)

Population (2021)
  - Municipality: 24,969
  - Density: 25.33/km^{2} (65.60/sq mi)
- Time zone: UTC+2 (EET)
  - Summer (DST): UTC+3 (EEST)

Almopia (Greek: Αλμωπία), or Enotia (Greek: Ενωτία), also known in the Middle Ages as Moglena (Greek: Μογλενά, Macedonian and Bulgarian: Меглен or Мъглен), is a municipality and a former province (επαρχία) of the Pella regional unit in Macedonia, Greece. The seat of the municipality is the town Aridaia. The municipality has an area of 985.817 km^{2}.

== History ==
=== Ancient ===
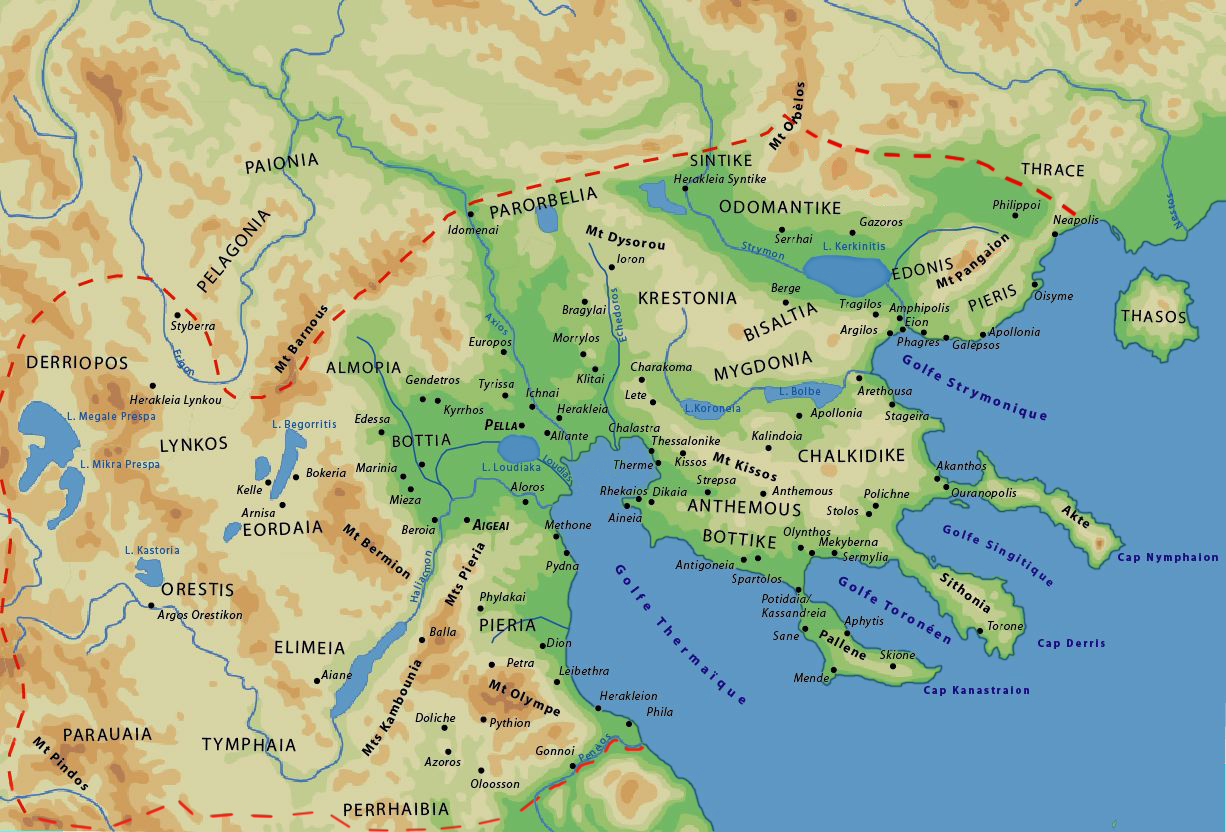
Map of the Kingdom of Macedon with Almopia located in the central districts of the kingdom.

The name Almopia (Ancient Greek: Ἀλμωπία, Almōpia) derives from the Almopes (Ἀλμῶπες), a Paeonian tribe that originally inhabited the area before being expelled from the region during the reign of Alexander I of Macedon(r. 498–454 BC) when Almopia was incorporated into Lower Macedonia. The Almopes traced their descent to the eponymous mythological figure of Almops, son of the Greek God Poseidon and Helle. The 2nd-century astronomer and geographer Claudius Ptolemy records three cities in the region in his Geography: Horma (Ὅρμα), Europos (Εὔρωπος) and Apsalos (Ἄψαλος).

=== Medieval ===
In the early Byzantine period, the area was renamed to Enotia (Greek: Ενωτία) after a nearby fortress, probably in the vicinity of modern Notia. The name was revived between 1915 and 1927 for the Greek province as well.

In the later Middle Ages, the area was known as Moglena (Greek: Μογλενά, Macedonian: Меглен, Bulgarian: Мъглен), from the Slavic word for "fog". Until the early 11th century, Moglena was a province of the First Bulgarian Empire. Captured by the Byzantine emperor Basil II in 1015, it is attested as the seat of a bishopric in 1020, and as capital of its own theme in 1086. The area remained under Byzantine rule until the aftermath of the Fourth Crusade, when it was captured by Tsar Kaloyan of the Second Bulgarian Empire. It was incorporate in the Serbian Empire by Stefan Dušan in 1346.

=== Modern ===
Moglena was inhabited mainly by Megleno-Romanians and Slavic people. In Ottoman times, the region was also known by its Turkish name Karacova or Karadjova valley ("Black Valley", Greek: Καρατζόβα) or in Ottoman Turkish: كاراجاوا. Angelis Gatsos, a Slavophone Greek military commander during the Greek War of Independence, was born in the village of Sarakinovo, today known as Sarakinoi in Almopia municipality. Until the Greco-Turkish War (1919–1922) and the population exchange between Greece and Turkey in 1924, Muslim Pomaks and Megleno-Romanians made up part of the population.

== Municipality ==
The municipality Almopia was formed at the 2011 local government reform by the merger of the following 2 former municipalities, that became municipal units:

- Aridaia
- Exaplatanos

== Province ==
The province of Almopia (Επαρχία Αλμωπίας) was one of the three provinces of Pella Prefecture. Its territory corresponded with that of the current municipality of Almopia. It was abolished in 2006.

== See also ==
- Megleno-Romanians
- Pomaks
- Population exchange between Greece and Turkey
