= Pella (regional unit) =

Pella Περιφερειακή ενότητα Πέλλας
- Regional unit
- Municipalities of Pella

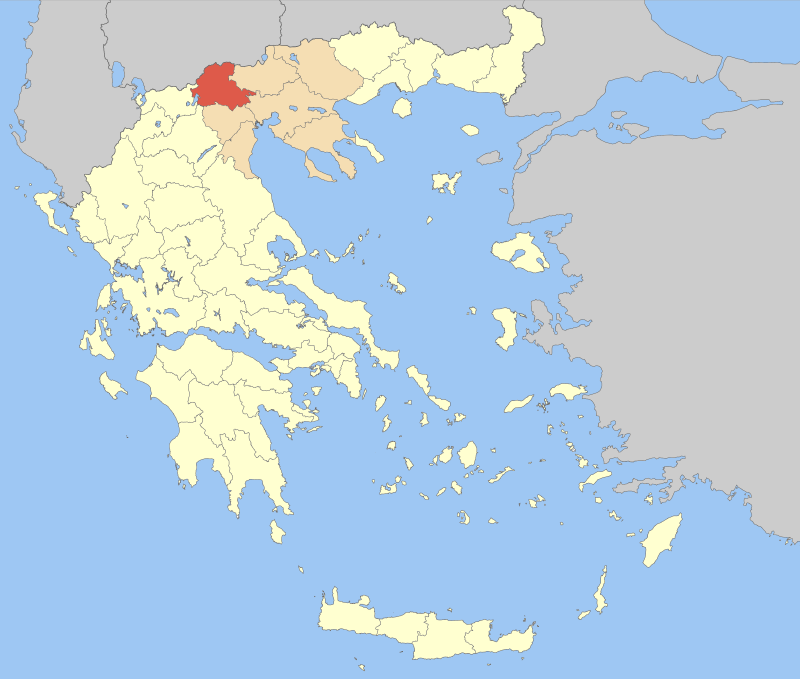
- Pella within Greece

- Location within Greece
- Coordinates: 40°55′N 22°05′E
- Country: Greece
- Administrative region: Central Macedonia
- Seat: Edessa
- Largest town: Giannitsa, Pella (municipality)

Area
  - Total: 2,506 km^{2} (968 sq mi)

Population (2021)
  - Total: 126,740
  - Density: 50.57/km^{2} (131.0/sq mi)
- Time zone: UTC+2 (EET)
  - Summer (DST): UTC+3 (EEST)
- Postal code: 58x xx
- Area code: 238x0
- Vehicle registration: ΕΕ
- Website: www.pella.gr

Pella (Greek: Περιφερειακή ενότητα Πέλλας) is one of the regional units of Greece, in the geographic region of Macedonia. It is part of the Region of Central Macedonia. It is named after the ancient city of Pella, the capital of ancient Macedonia and the birthplace of Alexander the Great. The capital of Pella is Edessa with a population of 19,036 inhabitants according to the census of 2021, while the largest town is Giannitsa. Other towns include Aridaia, Skydra, Arnissa, Exaplatanos and Krya Vrysi.

== Administration ==
According to the 2011 census the population of the regional unit of Pella was 139,680. It is subdivided into 4 municipalities. These are:

- Almopia (2)
- Edessa (1)
- Pella (3)
- Skydra (4)

=== Prefecture ===
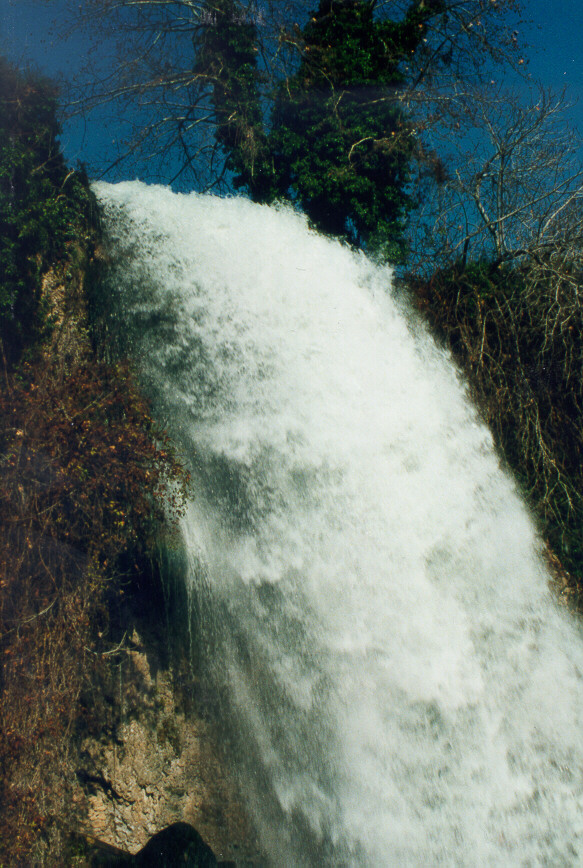
Edessa Waterfall

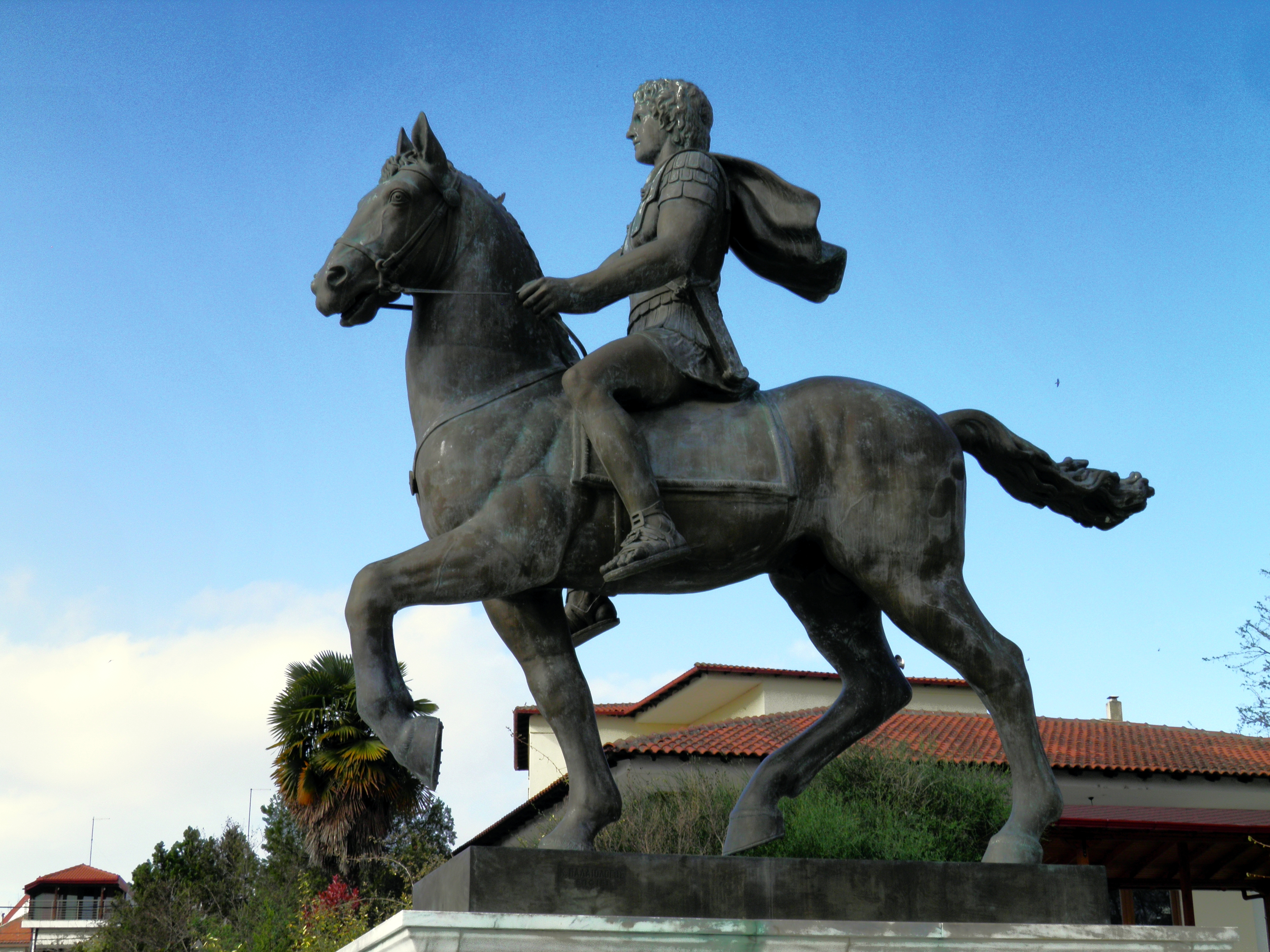
Statue of Alexander the Great in Pella (municipality).

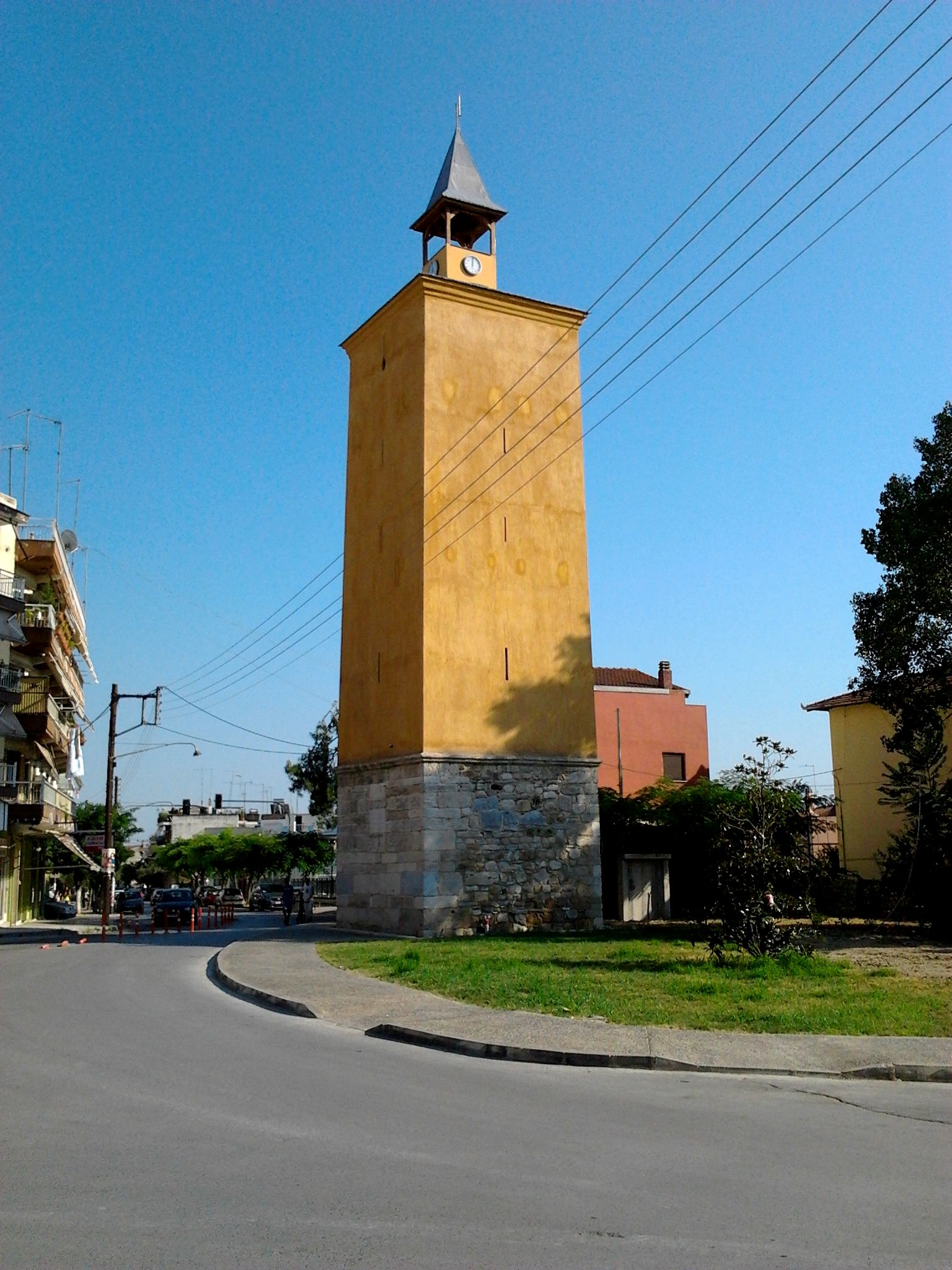
Clocktower of Giannitsa

As a part of the 2011 Kallikratis government reform, the regional unit of Pella was created out of the former prefecture Pella (Greek: Νομός Πέλλας). The prefecture had the same territory as the present regional unit. At the same time, the municipalities were reorganised, according to the table below.

New municipality	Old municipalities	Seat
Almopia	Aridaia	Aridaia
Almopia	Exaplatanos	Aridaia
Edessa	Edessa	Edessa
Edessa	Vegoritida	Edessa
Pella	Pella	Giannitsa
Pella	Giannitsa	Giannitsa
Pella	Krya Vrysi	Giannitsa
Pella	Kyrros	Giannitsa
Pella	Megas Alexandros	Giannitsa
Skydra	Skydra	Skydra
Skydra	Meniida	Skydra

=== Provinces ===
The former prefecture of Pella was subdivided into the following provinces:

Provinces of Pella Prefecture	Seat (if different)
Province of Almopia	Aridaia
Province of Edessa	
Province of Giannitsa	

Note: Provinces no longer hold any legal status in Greece.

== Geography ==
The regional unit covers an area of 2,505.8 square kilometres (967 1/2 sq mi), the majority of which is covered by arable land, forests and pastures. Mountainous areas surrounding Pella are the Voras Mountains (with Kaimaktsalan reaching a height of 2,524 m), Mount Vermion (2,027 m), Mount Paiko (1,458 m), Mount Tzenna (2,182 m) and Mount Pinovo (2,154 m). The main plains are Pozar in the north and the vast plain of Giannitsà in the southeastern part. Other natural features of the area include Lakes Vegoritida and Agra, and Rivers Loudias and Edessian. Pella's southernmost portion is flat and in ancient times, it was a gulf connected to the Aegean Sea. The elevation in the south does not exceed about 5 to 10 m (16 to 33 ft) above sea level. Pella has surface and groundwater resources. There are a number of archaeological sites in the area.

Pella borders the regional units of Kilkis to the northeast, Thessaloniki to the east, Imathia to the south, Kozani to the southwest, by Lake Vegoritida to the southwest, and by Florina to the west. To the north, it is bounded by the national border between Greece and North Macedonia.

== History ==
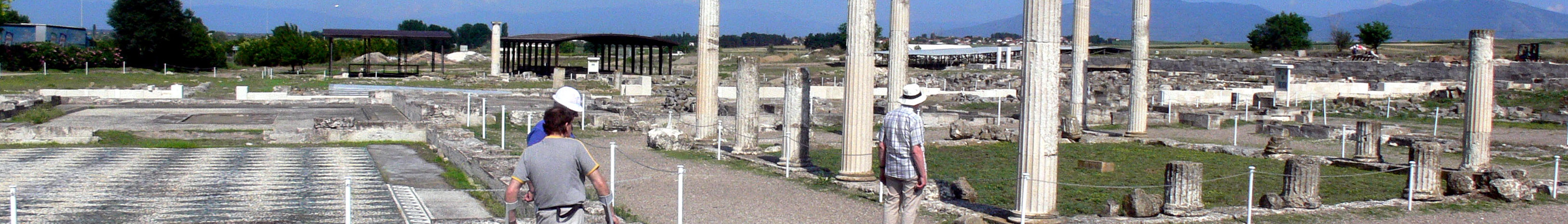

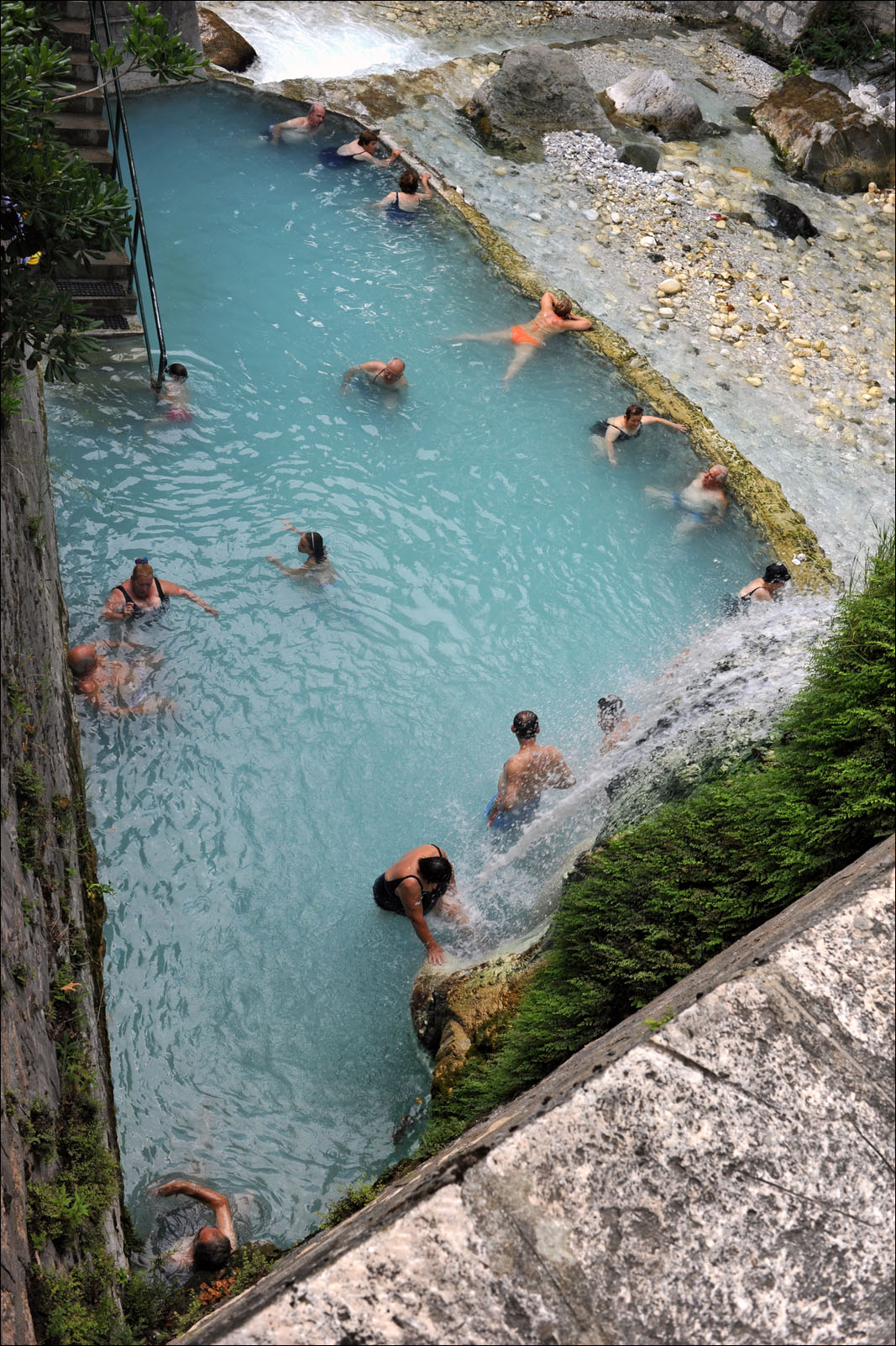
Pozar Thermal Baths

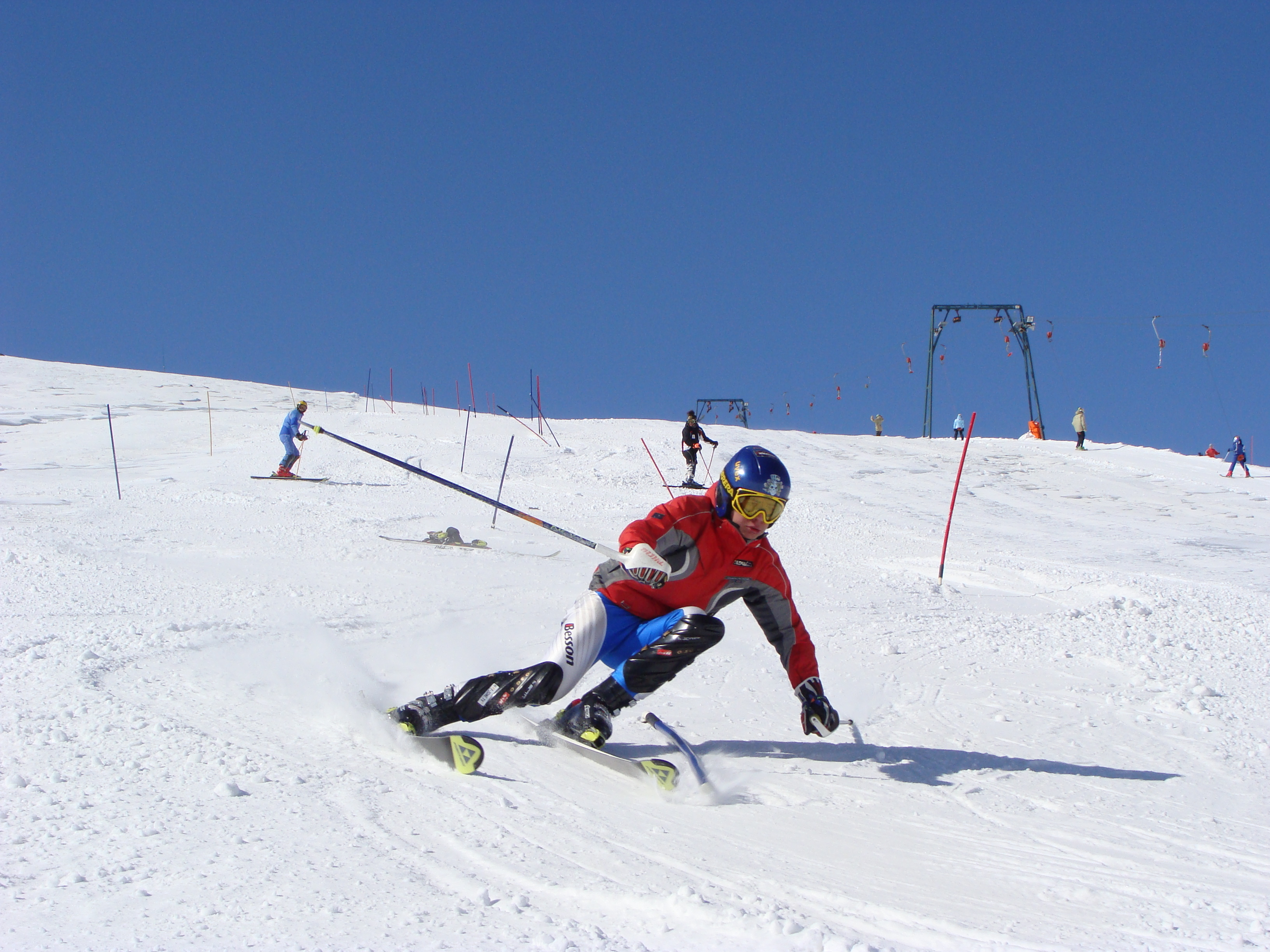
Kaimaktsalan Ski Area

In antiquity, the area around the modern Pella regional unit was part of the ancient Greek Kingdom of Macedon. It later became part of the Roman Empire and later the Byzantine and the Ottoman Empires. Following approximately 500 years of Ottoman rule, it rejoined Greece in 1913, following the Balkan Wars.

== Tourism ==
- Ancient Pella and Archaeological Museum of Pella: The capital of ancient Macedonia and birthplace of Alexander the Great. A number of archaeological findings are housed in the Palace and the New Museum.
- Loudias River
- Waterfalls in the city of Edessa
- Pozar thermal baths: The hot springs are located in a mountainous area (altitude 360–390 m) and occupy an area of 30 hectares (75 acres). Five spa gush along the warm river, which continues to flow in the basin of Almopia.
- Kaimakchalan ski resort: Mount Kaimakchalan or Vorras is the third largest in height mount in Greece (altitude 2,524 m). There is a ski area with 16 ski slopes. At the foot of the mountain there is the village of Agios Athanasios.
- Giannitsa Ottoman monuments: At the city of Giannitsa there are a lot of buildings from the Ottoman period like the Clock Tower, Mausoleum and baths of Gazi Evrenos, House of Emin Bey, The Baths and the mausoleum of Ahmet Bey, Mosque of Sheikh Ilachi, Mosque of Iskender Bey.

== Agriculture ==
The southern part of the regional unit has a number of orchards. While agriculture once represented its main industry, today, manufacturing, services and other businesses dominate about 70% of its industry.

== Transport ==
The Thessaloniki–Florina railway passes through the southwestern part of Pella, with the main train station being in Edessa. The main roads passing through the regional unit are the EO2 and Arnissa–Antigonos national roads, both part of European route E86: the planned upgrade to the Veria–Edessa road axis, part of Imathia Provincial Road 1 and Pella Provincial Road 3, is partly built and incomplete.

== See also ==
- List of settlements in the Pella regional unit
- Former toponyms of places in Pella Prefecture
