= Asenov =

Asenov (Bulgarian: Асенов) is a Bulgarian surname derived from the personal name Asen. Notable people with the surname include:

- Borislav Asenov (born 1959), Bulgarian cyclist
- Dimitar Nikolov Asenov, known as Hadzhi Dimitar (1840–1868), Bulgarian revolutionary
- Krastyo Asenov (1877–1903), Bulgarian revolutionary, nephew of Dimitar
- Stefan Asenov (born 1972), Bulgarian modern pentathlete
- Yordan Asenov (1869–1936), Bulgarian revolutionary, brother of Krastyo
- Venka Asenova (1930–1986), Bulgarian women chess grandmaster

== See also ==
- Asenov, Veliko Tarnovo, district in Bulgaria
