= Dytiko, Pella =

Dytiko Δυτικό
- Community
- Location within Greece
- Coordinates: 40°51′30″N 22°31′50″E
- Country: Greece
- Administrative region: Central Macedonia
- Regional unit: Pella
- Municipality: Pella
- Municipal unit: Pella
- Elevation: 76 m (249 ft)

Population (2021)
  - Community: 387
- Time zone: UTC+2 (EET)
  - Summer (DST): UTC+3 (EEST)
- Postal code: 58005

Dytiko (Greek: Δυτικό) is a village in the Pella regional unit, Greece. In 2021 the population was 387.

== History ==
Historically Dytiko was a Bulgarian village named Konikovo (Bulgarian: Кониково, Greek: Κονίκοβο). One of the earliest sources of the village is the Gospel of Kovikovo (Greek: Ευαγγέλιο του Κονικόβου), a book written by monk Pavel (Greek: Ιερομάναχος Πάβελ) and printed in 1852 in Thessaloniki. It was found in 2003 in the library of the Greek Orthodox Patriachate of Alexandria. It’s written in both Greek and Slavic vernacular, with the aim of displacing Greek and emancipating the Slavic written language.

After 1926 the population consisted of Pontic Greeks who had arrived from Pontus in the course of the population exchange. At that time, a large number of the inhabitants were farmers. Although the official language was formal Greek, Pontic Greek widely remained the common spoken language. This however, has most likely changed among the younger generation.

During the Greek military junta of 1967-1974 public electricity was installed.

Many pensioners of the village are returned guest workers from Germany. They immigrated into Germany during the late 1960s and 1970s when labour was needed. Rural exodus into cities was also a factor for the population decline. In the last 30 years however, the population has stabilized and only slightly changed.

== Infrastructure ==
Today the village has multiple cafés and restaurants along with a bakery and a grocery store. There is an elementary school and a Greek-Orthodox church.
Public transport by bus connects Dytiko to neighboring villages and cities. Because there is no secondary school in Dytiko, students above 6th grade have to go to Giannitsa.

Nearby the village is an agricultural factory called Rodi Hellas (Greek: Ρόδι Ελλάς). It mainly produces pomegranate products, including jam, juice and balsamic vinegar.

== Football club ==
PAOK Dytikou
- Full name: Πανθεσσαλονίκειος Αθλητικός Όμιλος Κωνσταντινοπολιτών Δυτικού
- Founded: 1958
- Ground: Dytiko, Pella, Central Macedonia, Greece
- Manager: Theo Andreadis
- League: Pella Football Clubs Association (Local football championship)
- Website: http://paok-dytikou.blogspot.com

PAOK Dytikou (Greek: ΠΑΟΚ Δυτικού) is a Greek football club based in Dytiko. The official motto of the club is Ο Αθλητισμός ενώνει, meaning Sport unites when translated into English.

=== History ===
The club was originally founded in 1958 as Aris Dytikou (Greek: Άρης Δυτικού) following the name of Aris Thessaloniki. It was changed later to match the more prominent name of PAOK Thessaloniki.

=== Football kit ===
As of August 2017 this is the official jersey of PAOK Dytikou, following the standard concept and colours of PAOK Thessaloniki.
On the lower back of the jersey a picture is printed, depicting Pontic Greek refugees of the Greek genocide (1913-1922). The picture is a reference to the history of the village of Dytiko, which was settled by refugees who fled the genocide in Pontus.
