= Krastyo Asenov =

Bulgarian revolutionary

Voivode Krastyo Asenov
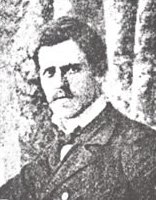
- A portrait of Krastyo Asenov.
- Birth name: Krastyo Hadzhipetrov Asenov
- Nicknames: The Bear (Mechkata); The Fiery Teacher (Ogneniot daskal); The Circassian (Cherkeza)
- Born: 12 February 1877 İslimiye, Adrianople Vilayet, Ottoman Empire (now Sliven, Bulgaria)
- Died: 25 July 1903 (aged 26) Kornishor, Salonika Vilayet, Ottoman Empire (now Kromni, Pella (municipality) Greece)
- Allegiance: IMRO
- Conflicts: Ilinden Uprising †

Krastyo Hadzhipetrov Asenov, nicknamed Mechkata (the Bear), Ogneniot daskal (the Fiery Teacher) and Cherkeza (the Circassian), was a Bulgarian revolutionary figure active in the region of Macedonia, one of the voyvodas of the Internal Macedonian-Adrianople Revolutionary Organization (IMARO) for the Enidzhe Vardar region. He took part in the Macedonian struggle at the beginning of the 20th century.

== Biography ==
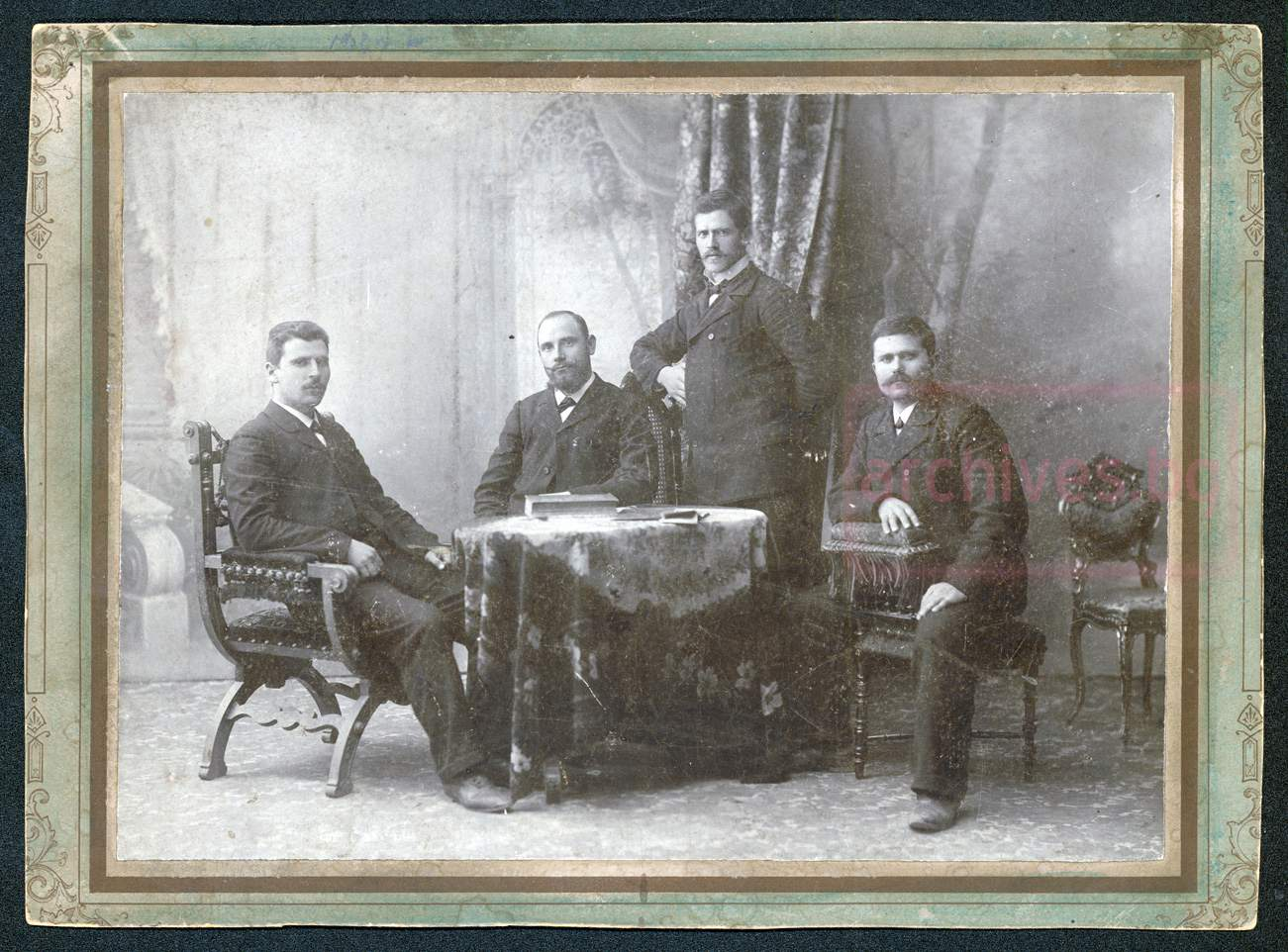
The participants in the Miss Stone Affair - Sava Mihaylov, Yane Sandanski, Krastyo Asenov и Hristo Chernopeev.

Krastyo Asenov was born in 1877 in Sliven. He was a nephew of the famous Bulgarian voyvoda Hadzhi Dimitar and a brother of the IMARO revolutionary Yordan Asenov. He graduated from the Bulgarian Men's High School of Varna and later from the Sofia University. Afterwards Asenov worked as a Bulgarian Exarchate teacher in Macedonia.

Under the influence of Gotse Delchev, he joined the IMARO and the struggle for the liberation of Macedonia and Odrin from the Turkish yoke. When he was a teacher in the village of Leshko, Asenov met Yane Sandanski. He was one of the organizers and took an active role in the Miss Stone Affair. In 1902, his sister, Doctor Sabka Asenova, preserved a part of the ransom collected from the Miss Stone Affair. Asenov's cousins, Dimitar Asenov and Ivan Asenov were freedom fighters in the revolutionary band of the voyvoda Toma Davidov. During 1902, Asenov's revolutionary activity was concentrated on the right coast of the Struma River.

During the Ilinden-Preobrazhenie Uprising he was a voyvoda of the Kilkis cheta and fought against the Ottomans in the area of the Paiak Mountain.

In the village of Kornishor, there was a merger between the Kilkis band of Krastyo Asenov, and the Enizhe-Vardar bands of Apostol Petkov and Ivan Karasuliyata. Here the flag of the uprising was sanctified before 250 Macedonian freedom fighters.

On 6 June he fought a battle against Turkish soldiers near the Ardzhan Lake, in which Milan Delchev was killed. On 16 June Asenov fought a battle near the village of Postol.

Despite the rumour amongst his fellows, that it would be a bad sign, on 25 July, when the Uprising was still ongoing, he married Ana Maleshevska, the daughter of the voyvoda Nikola Maleshevski, in the village of Kornishor (today known as Kromni), in the Enidzhe-Vardar region. However, he was killed only several days after the wedding by his superstitious comrades, dissatisfied with his decision to marry. Later, they were sentenced to death by the IMARO revolutionary-court.
