= Aravissos =

Aravissos Αραβησσός
- Community
- Location within Greece
- Coordinates: 40°50′35″N 22°18′12″E
- Country: Greece
- Administrative region: Central Macedonia
- Regional unit: Pella
- Municipality: Pella
- Municipal unit: Kyrros
- Elevation: 56 m (184 ft)

Population (2021)
  - Community: 1,170
- Time zone: UTC+2 (EET)
  - Summer (DST): UTC+3 (EEST)
- Postal code: 581 00
- Area code: 23820

Aravissos (Greek: Αραβησσός) is a village in Pella, Greece. The village lies at the foot of Mount Paiko and is 11 km northwest of Giannitsa.

== History ==
The name of the village, which belonged to the community of Asiar Bey, was originally Ompar.

Most of its inhabitants were refugee families, mainly from Cappadocia, but also from Gallipoli, who settled in the area after the population exchange of 1923. Refugees from Anatolia stayed in state-built houses and engaged in agriculture. Diseases such as malaria were common due to the proximity to the Swamp of Giannitsa. Later, refugees from Enehil, who were also engaged in agriculture, arrived at a textile factory.

The village has two churches, the central church of the Transfiguration of the Savior and the second church in the village cemetery, dedicated to the Prophet Elias.

== Climate ==
The climate in the area is humid and subtropical. The average annual temperature in the neighbourhood is 16°C. The warmest month is July, when the average temperature is 26°C, and the coldest is December, with 3°C. Average annual rainfall is 907 millimetres. The wettest month is February, with an average of 120 mm of precipitation, and the driest is August, with 23 mm of precipitation.

== Spring ==
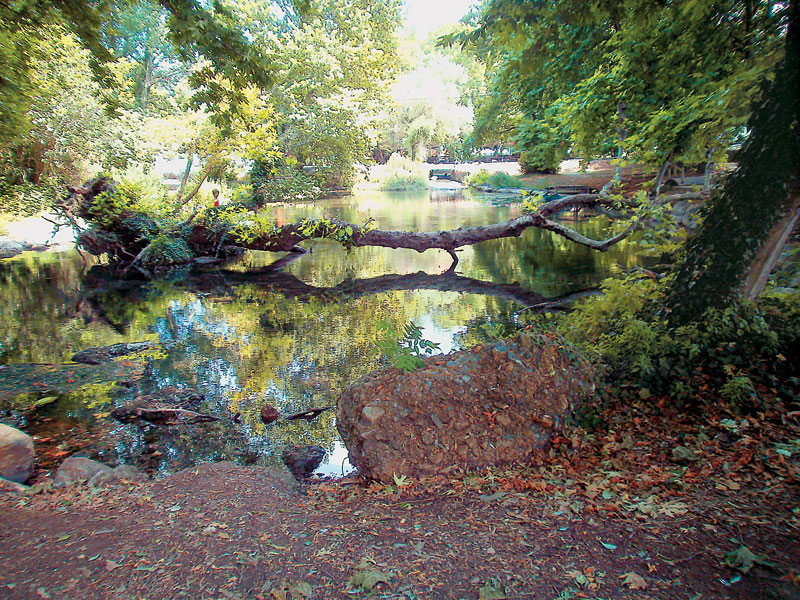

The springs of Aravissos have been characterized as a wetland and is located half a kilometre southeast of the village. It has an area of 0.2km² and is located at an altitude of 43 meters. There are dining areas for visitors.
