= Krya Vrysi, Pella =

Krya Vrysi Κρύα Βρύση
- Municipal unit
- Location within the regional unit

- Location within Greece
- Coordinates: 40°41′N 22°18′E
- Country: Greece
- Administrative region: Central Macedonia
- Regional unit: Pella
- Municipality: Pella

Area
  - Municipal unit: 77.0 km^{2} (29.7 sq mi)
- Elevation: 7 m (23 ft)

Population (2021)
  - Municipal unit: 7,255
  - Municipal unit density: 94.2/km^{2} (244/sq mi)
  - Community: 4,374
- Time zone: UTC+2 (EET)
  - Summer (DST): UTC+3 (EEST)
- Postal code: 583 00
- Area code: 23820–6

Krya Vrysi (Greek: Κρύα Βρύση, Plasničevo Macedonian: Пласничево, before 1927: Πλάσνα Plasna) is a town and a former municipality in Pella regional unit, Greece. Since the 2011 local government reform it is part of the municipality Pella, of which it is a municipal unit. The municipal unit has an area of 76.956 km^{2}. It is located 75 km west of Thessaloniki and 2 km east of the Early Neolithic settlement of Nea Nikomideia.

== History ==
The town of Krya Vrysi, named Plasna before 1927, became an independent community in 1934, when it was separated from Valta. After the lake that covered the place was drained, the people had trouble finding drinkable water. When they found a source of cold, clear water, they called it "water from the Krya Vrysi (Cold Spring)", thus giving the town its name. The community Krya Vrysi became a municipality in 1990. The economy in the area is primarily based on agriculture with the farmers mainly growing corn and asparagus. They were also growing a great amount of Berley tobacco, until 2005 when the production was stopped in the region due to European Union's economical issues.

== Annual events ==
Krya Vrysi, being the centre for many smaller villages, is the host of various annual events. The Krya Vrysi Carnival has been the biggest regional multi-event including a large carnival procession. It takes place each year on the carnival three days' holiday since 1988 and has become an important tourist attraction for the town. During the Greek economic crisis it was temporarily paused (2009-2011). Another major annual event is the Agrotechnical Expo which is held in September. It combines a number of agricultural-related exhibits with a funfair (gr. πανηγύρι).

== Sports ==
Krya Vrysi hosts at the Yiannis Tserkezidis Municipal Stadium the Apollon Krya Vrysi sports club founded in 1960. It currently competes in the 1. local league, but in the past it was promoted to the 2. national league. On the occasion of an initiative of the association of Veteran Footballers of Apollon Krya Vrysi for the creation of the Apollo Museum and the Folklore Museum of Krya Vrysi, the club invited the 2004 European Champion to the municipal stadium in September 2023 along with many other internationally known football personalities (see images below). The international guests competed in a friendly game with the team of Veteran Footballers

The president of the Veteran Footballers Takis Fostiropoulos with the invited guests...

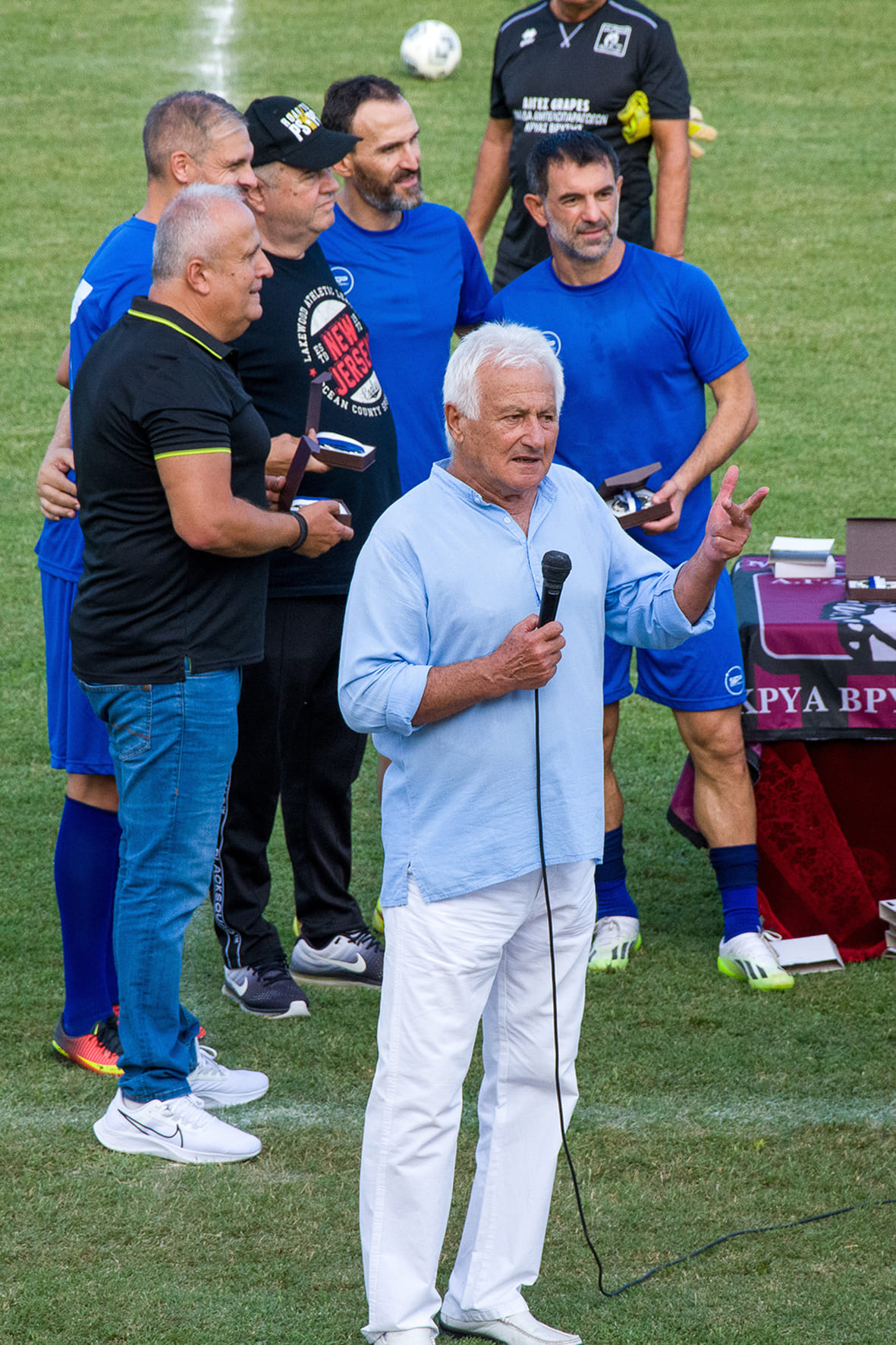
Ioannis Topalidis, Angelos Charisteas, Andreas Vlahos, Nikos Dabizas, Giorgos Karagounis

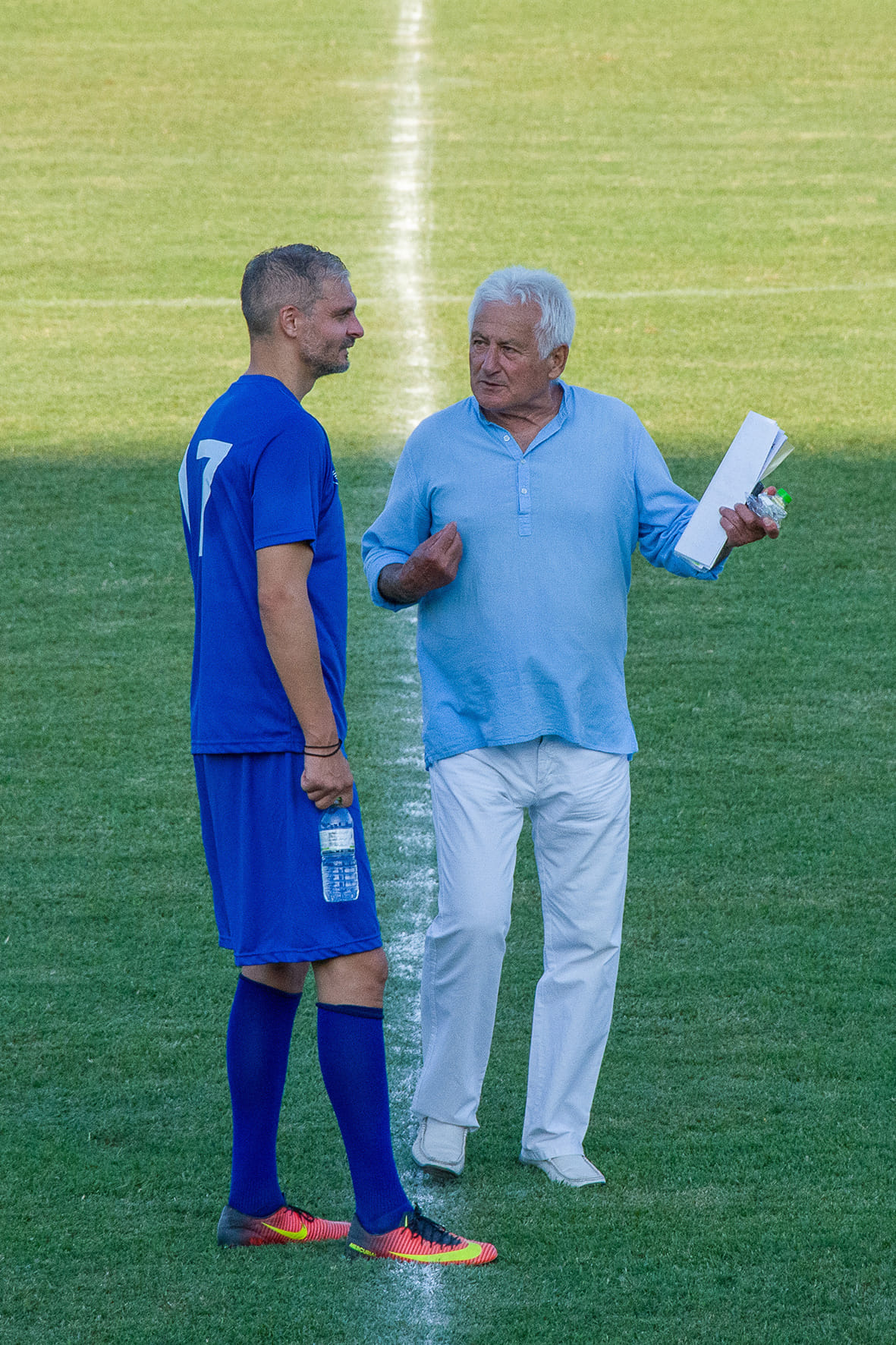
Angelos Charisteas

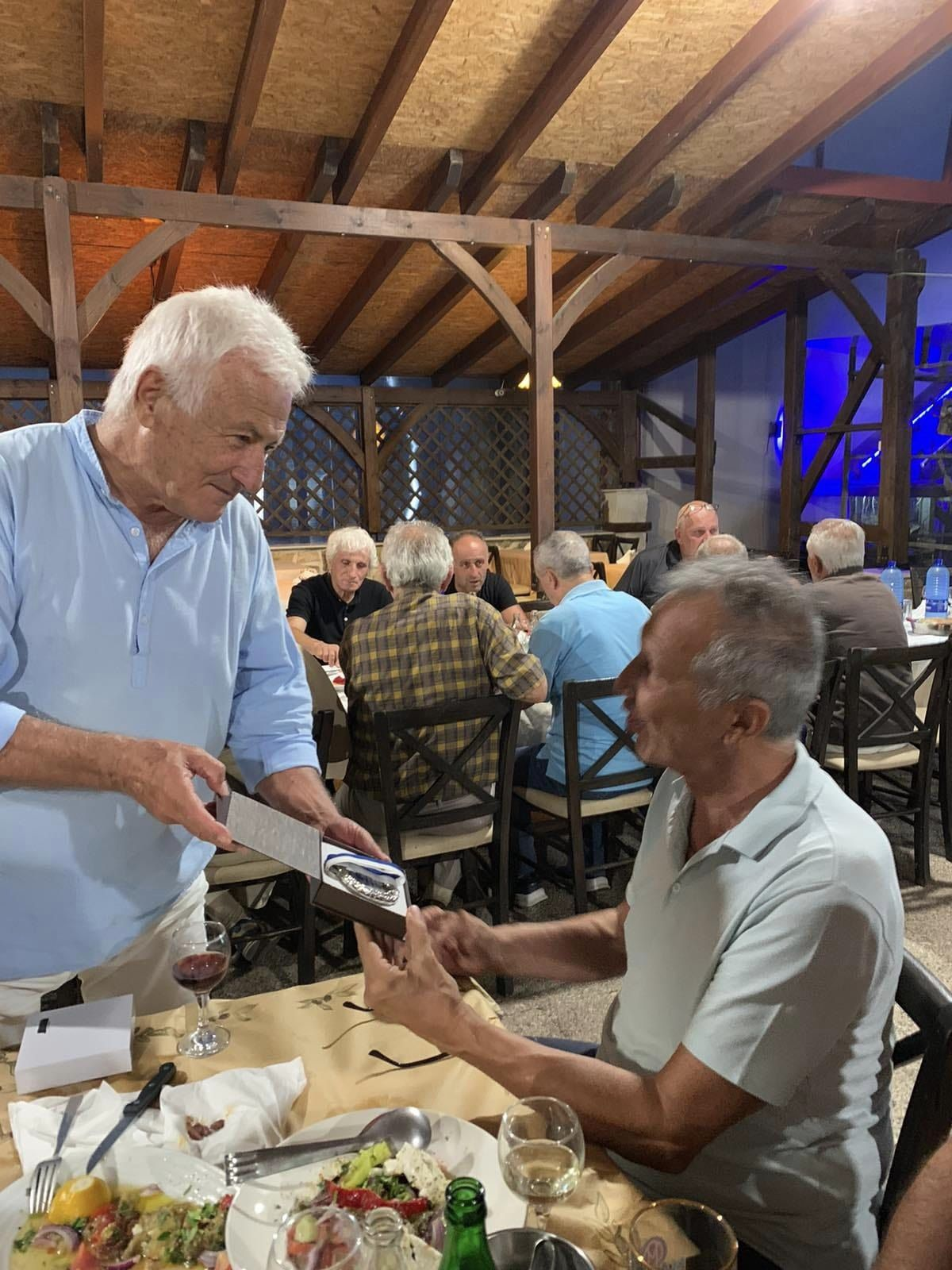
Konstantinos Orfanos

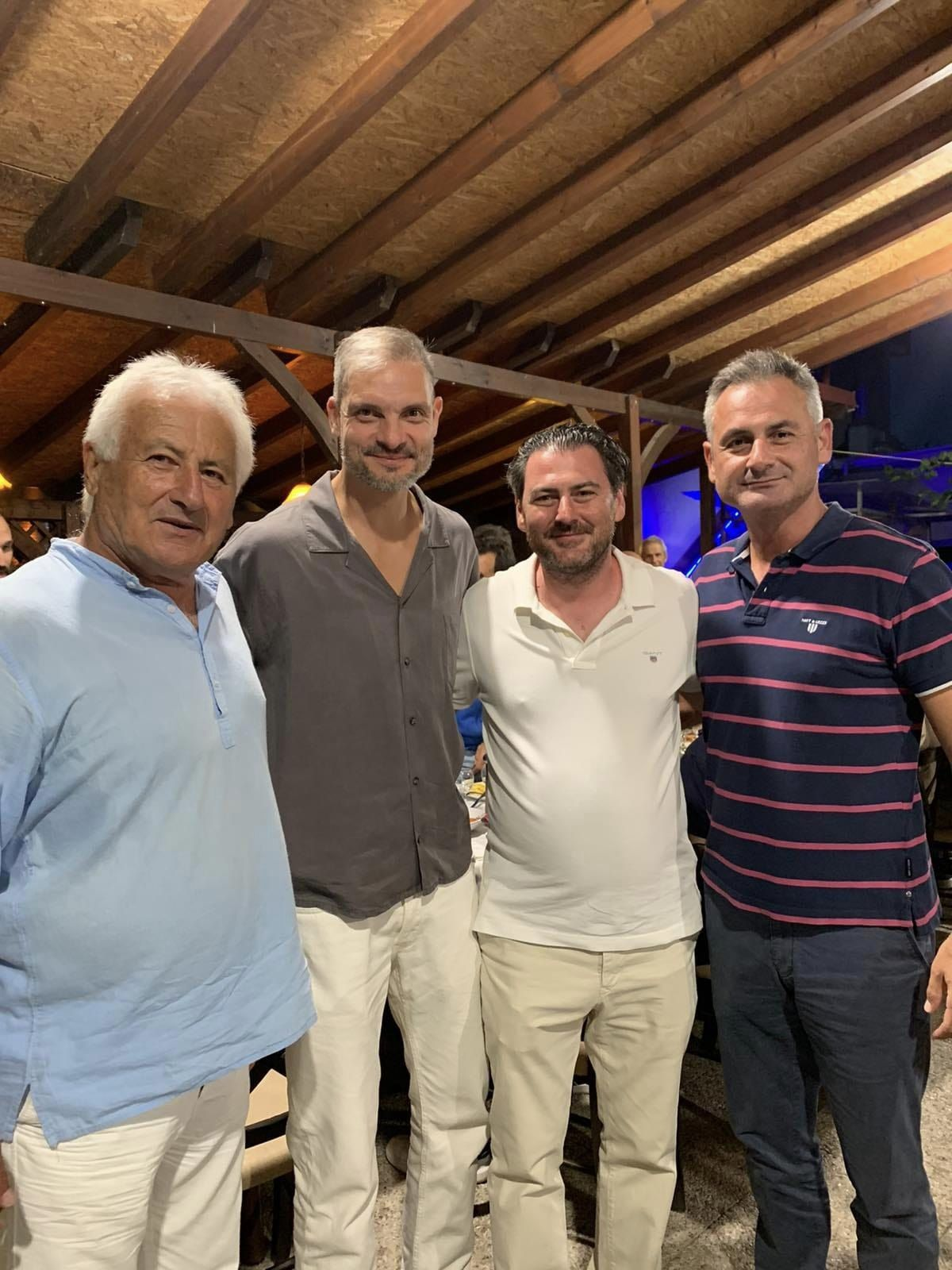
Angelos Charisteas and Fostiropoulos' sons Hari and Kostis

== Notable natives ==
1. Tryfon Markovitsis (1921-2008). He graduated from the American Farm School of Thessaloniki. He developed a model orchard cultivation and founded the first canning unit in Krya Vrysi.
2. Demosthenes Delegiannis (*1938), lawyer, politician. From 1973 to 1981 he had been Member of Parliament.
3. Takis Fostiropoulos, (*1950), President of the Piraeus Coaches Association (Σύνδεσμος Προπονητών Ποδοσφαίρου Πειραιά) that received honours from UNESCO (2016). In 1990 he had been the first coach of the then founded Greece women's national football team, and 1989–2002 coach of the Joint Youth and Children Groups of Piraeus Football Clubs Association. 1966–74 he had been team member of Apollon Kryas Vrysis (Απόλλων Κρύας Βρύσης) when the team had been playing in the second national league.
4. Dimitra Markovitsi, (*1954), is an Emeritus Research Director at the French National Center for Scientific Research. Her studies shed light on the first steps occurring when ultraviolet radiation is absorbed by DNA. She is the Chair of the International Foundation for Photochemistry and served as President of the European Photochemistry Association (2007-2010). With her husband, Gérard Balland, she translated into French the historical novel by M. Karagatsis "Sergius and Bacchus".
5. [[:el:%CE%98%CE%B5%CF%8C%CE%B4%CF%89%CF%81%CE%BF%CF%82 %CE%98%CE%B5%CE%BF%CE%B4%CF%89%CF%81%CE%AF%CE%B4%CE%B7%CF%82 (%CE%B1%CE%BD%CF%84%CE%B9%CF%80%CE%B5%CF%81%CE%B9%CF%86%CE%B5%CF%81%CE%B5%CE%B9%CE%AC%CF%81%CF%87%CE%B7%CF%82 %CE%A|Theodoros Theodoridis]] (*1956) is a Greek architect and politician. He served as a Community Councillor of Krya Vrysi from 1986 to 1990, Mayor of Krya Vrysi from 1991 to 2002, Prefectural Councillor of Pella from 2003 to 2010, Deputy Regional Governor of Pella from 2011 to 2019, and has been a Municipal Councillor of Pella since 2019.
6. Nikolaos Fostiropoulos, (*1958), had been elected to the Karlsruhe (Germany) City Council from 1999 to 2019 as a member of the left party Die Linke. He is founder and owner of company alfatraining that has been listed in the top 20 of German providers of further education.
7. Konstantinos Fostiropoulos, (*1960), physicist, 2003–2016 head of the Organic Solar Cells Group at HZB. In 1989/90 he was the first to develop a method to synthesize the "football molecule" C_{60} fullerene. (ΤΟ ΒΗΜΑ)
