= Dimitra Markovitsi =

Researcher

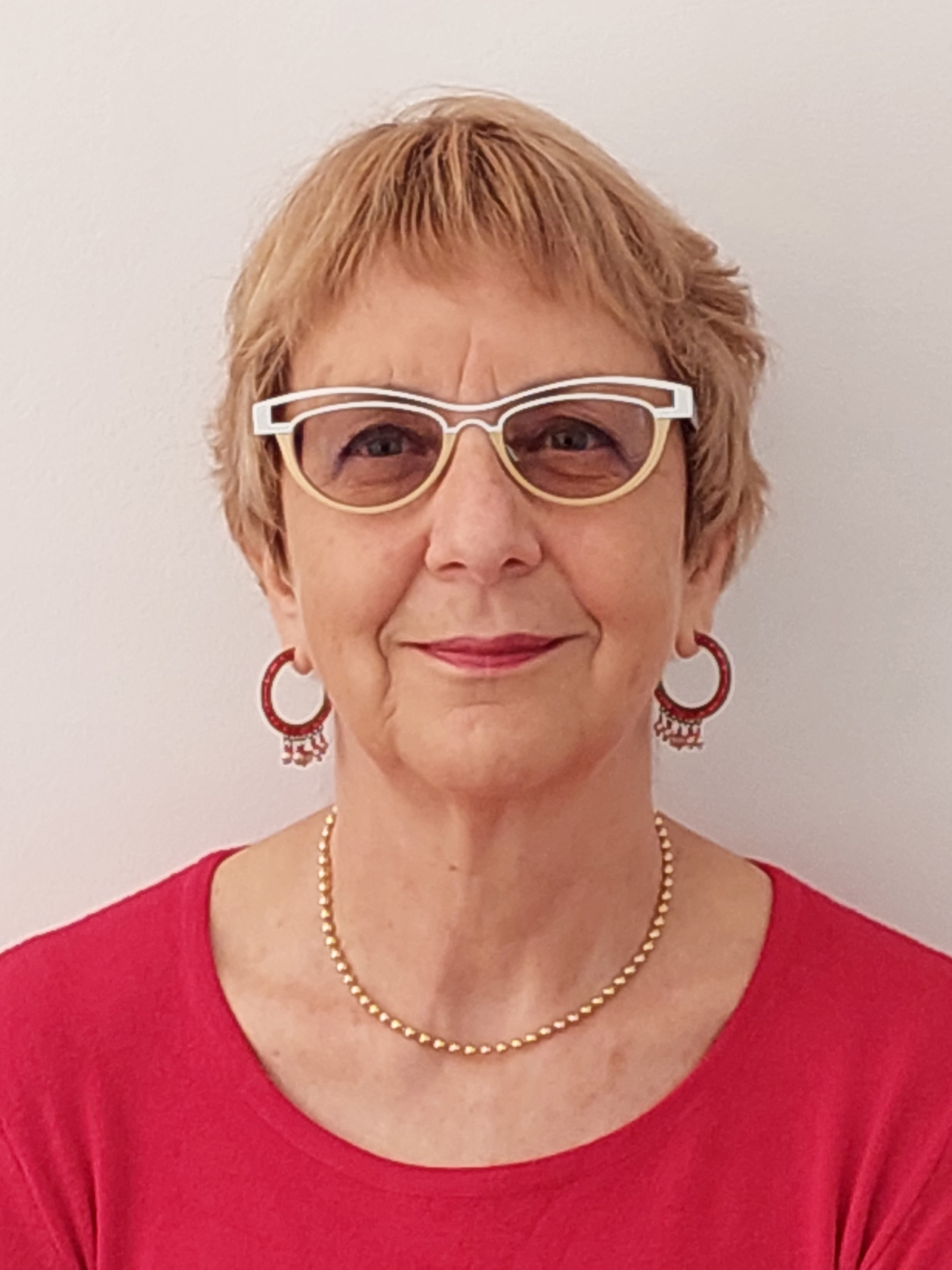
Markovitsi in 2022

Dimitra Markovitsi is a Greek-French photochemist. She is currently an Emeritus Research Director at the French National Center for Scientific Research (CNRS). She pioneered studies on the electronically excited states of liquid crystals and made significant advances to the understanding of processes triggered in DNA upon absorption of UV radiation. The two facets of her work have been the subject of a recent Marie Skodowska Curie European training network entitled "Light DyNAmics - DNA as a training platform for photodynamic processes in soft materials."

== Early life ==
1954 marks the birth of Markovitsi, daughter of Tryfon and Eleftheria, in Athens. From 1958 to 1969, she resided at Krya Vrysi, Pella. Then she returned to Athens, where she finished with a degree in chemical engineering from the National Technical University (1978). Thanks to a scholarship from the French government, she relocated to France, where she earned a "Diplôme d'Etudes Approfondies" (equivalent to a Master's degree) in 1979 on "Energy and Pollution" from the Université Paris VII and, later, a Ph.D. in Chemistry from the Louis Pasteur University at Strasbourg (1983).

== Research work ==
Dimitra Markovitsi's areas of research interest include photophysics and photochemistry in the condensed phase, time-resolved optical spectroscopy (absorption, fluorescence), excited states, energy, and charge transfer, charge separation, ionization, radical formation, photodamage, UV-induced primary processes in DNA (excited states, intrinsic fluorescence, electron ejection, oxidative damage) and G-quadruplexes.

Markovitsi studied the dimensionality of excitation transport in columnar phases. She discussed the effect of orientational disorder on the electronic excited states and introduced a model based on the exciton theory and quantum chemistry computations.

She published the first studies investigating the effect of structural disorder on the excited states of double helices and guanine quadruplexes. Simultaneously, she explored the behavior of the intrinsic DNA fluorescence from femtoseconds to nanoseconds. She provided evidence of the occurrence of excitation transport between nucleobases and the collective nature of Franck-Condon states. She reported the first spectroscopic investigation on DNA excited states in the UVA region; despite their very poor absorption, such excited states may contribute to the deterioration of the genetic code by solar light, whose UVA intensity is greater than that of UVB and UVC. She identified an unanticipated phenomenon: low-energy UV radiation can ionize DNA multimers (but not their monomeric components), generating electron holes in the nucleobases. The latter radical species are precursors of oxidative damage and provide promise for nanodevices based on photoconductivity. She demonstrated that the photoionization of guanine quadruplexes can be adjusted by varying their structural parameters.

Markovitsi also investigated DNA reaction dynamics on nanosecond to millisecond timescales. This work focuses on the dimerization of nucleobases and the deprotonation and tautomerization of the guanine radical. Her research revealed the anisotropic character of such events, which are highly dependent on the local DNA environment, rendering the conventional models of chemical kinetics inadequate for describing them.

Markovitsi’s work has been published in collective books, including the “Handbook of Organic Photochemistry and Photobiology.

== Career ==
While at Strasbourg in 1981, Markovitsi joined the CNRS. Invited by the Royal Society, she worked during 1984 at the Royal Institution of Great Britain, directed by George Porter. Then she relocated to the Paris area, where she worked from 1985 until 2021 in the CEA Paris-Saclay, in joint research Laboratories of the CNRS and the French Alternative Energies and Atomic Energy Commission. From 2001 to 2014, she was the director of the Francis Perrin Laboratory (Laboratoire Francis Perrin). After being appointed Emeritus Research Director, she moved to the Institut de Chimie Physique - Université Paris-Saclay.

Markovitsi served as president of the European Photochemistry Association from 2007 to 2010, and since 2014 she is the president of the International Foundation for Photochemistry.

== Relevant publications ==
- D. Markovitsi, On the Use of the Intrinsic DNA Fluorescence for Monitoring Its Damage: A Contribution from Fundamental Studies. 2024, https://doi.org/10.1021/acsomega.4c02256
- D. Markovitsi, Processes triggered in guanine quadruplexes by direct absorption of UV radiation: From fundamental studies toward optoelectronic biosensors, Photochem. Photobiol. 2023, https://doi.org/10.1111/php.13826
- Balanikas, E.; Banyasz, A.; Baldacchino, G.; Markovitsi, D. Deprotonation Dynamics of Guanine Radical Cations. Photochem. Photobiol. 2022, 98, 523-531.
- Gustavsson, T.; Markovitsi, D. Fundamentals of the Intrinsic DNA Fluorescence. Acc. Chem. Res. 2021, 54, 1226-1235.
- Balanikas, E.; Banyasz, A.; Douki, T.; Baldacchino, G.; Markovitsi, D. Guanine Radicals Induced in DNA by Low-Energy Photoionization. Acc. Chem. Res. 2020, 53, 1511–1519.
- Banyasz, A.; Vay, I.; Changenet-Barret, P.; Gustavsson, T.; Douki, T.; Markovitsi, D. Base-pairing enhances fluorescence and favors cyclobutane dimer formation induced upon absorption of UVA radiation by DNA. J. Am. Chem. Soc. 2011, 133, 5163-5165.
- Ecoffet, C.; Markovitsi, D.; Millie, P.; Lemaistre, J. Electronic excitations in organized molecular systems. A model for columnar aggregates of ionic compounds. Chem. Phys. 1993, 177, 629-643.

== Other activities ==
Dimitra Markovitsi and her husband Gérard Balland translated from Greek into French the historical novel “Σέργιος και Βάκχος” by M. Karagatsis, appeared in Greece in 1959.
