= Megas Alexandros, Pella =

Megas Alexandros Μέγας Αλέξανδρος
- Municipal unit
- Location within the regional unit

- Location within Greece
- Coordinates: 40°45′N 22°17′E
- Country: Greece
- Administrative region: Central Macedonia
- Regional unit: Pella
- Municipality: Pella

Area
  - Municipal unit: 88.9 km^{2} (34.3 sq mi)

Population (2021)
  - Municipal unit: 6,033
  - Municipal unit density: 67.9/km^{2} (176/sq mi)
- Time zone: UTC+2 (EET)
  - Summer (DST): UTC+3 (EEST)
- Vehicle registration: ΕΕ

Megas Alexandros (Greek: Μέγας Αλέξανδρος, Alexander the Great) is a former municipality in the Pella regional unit, Greece. Since the 2011 local government reform it is part of the municipality Pella, of which it is a municipal unit. It is named after Alexander the Great. The municipal unit has an area of 88.925 km^{2}. Population 6,033 (2021). The seat of the municipality was in Galatades.
