= Yordan Asenov =

Bulgarian revolutionary (1869–1936)

- Born: 28 December 1869; Sliven, today Bulgaria
- Died: 29 March 1936 (aged 66); Sofia, Bulgaria
- Organization: IMARO

Yordan Hadzhipetrov Asenov (Bulgarian: Йордан Хаджипетров Асенов; 28 December 1869 – 29 March 1936) was a Bulgarian revolutionary, a worker of the Internal Macedonian-Adrianople Revolutionary Organization (IMARO).

Yordan Asenov was born in 1869 in Sliven, then part of the Ottoman Empire. He was a nephew of the legendary revolutionary figure, the voyvoda Hadzhi Dimitar, and an elder brother of Krǎstyo Asenov. He graduated from the Sliven High School and participated in the activity of the Supreme Macedonian-Adrianople Committee. After the split that happened in the SMAC on its Tenth Congress of the organization in July 1902, Yordan Asenov, as a friend of Gotse Delchev, supported the wing of engineer Hristo Stanishev, which supported the IMARO. Asenov was elected a treasurer of the organization, whose president was Hristo Stanishev. Toma Karayovov was a vice-president, while Peyo Yavorov and Stoyan Petrov were advisers. Yordan Asenov participated also in the preparation of the Ilinden-Preobrazhenie Uprising.

After the Young Turk Revolution, Yordan Asenov withdrew from the active revolutionary activity and practiced his profession.

He died in Sofia in 1936.
