= Archaeological Museum of Pella =

Museum in Greece

- Αρχαιολογικό Μουσείο Πέλλας
- Established: 2009
- Location: Pella 580 05, Pella, Central Macedonia, Greece
- Coordinates: 40°45′43″N 22°31′09″E
- Type: Archaeological
- Website: https://www.palaceofpella.gr/archaeological-museum-of-pella/?lang=en

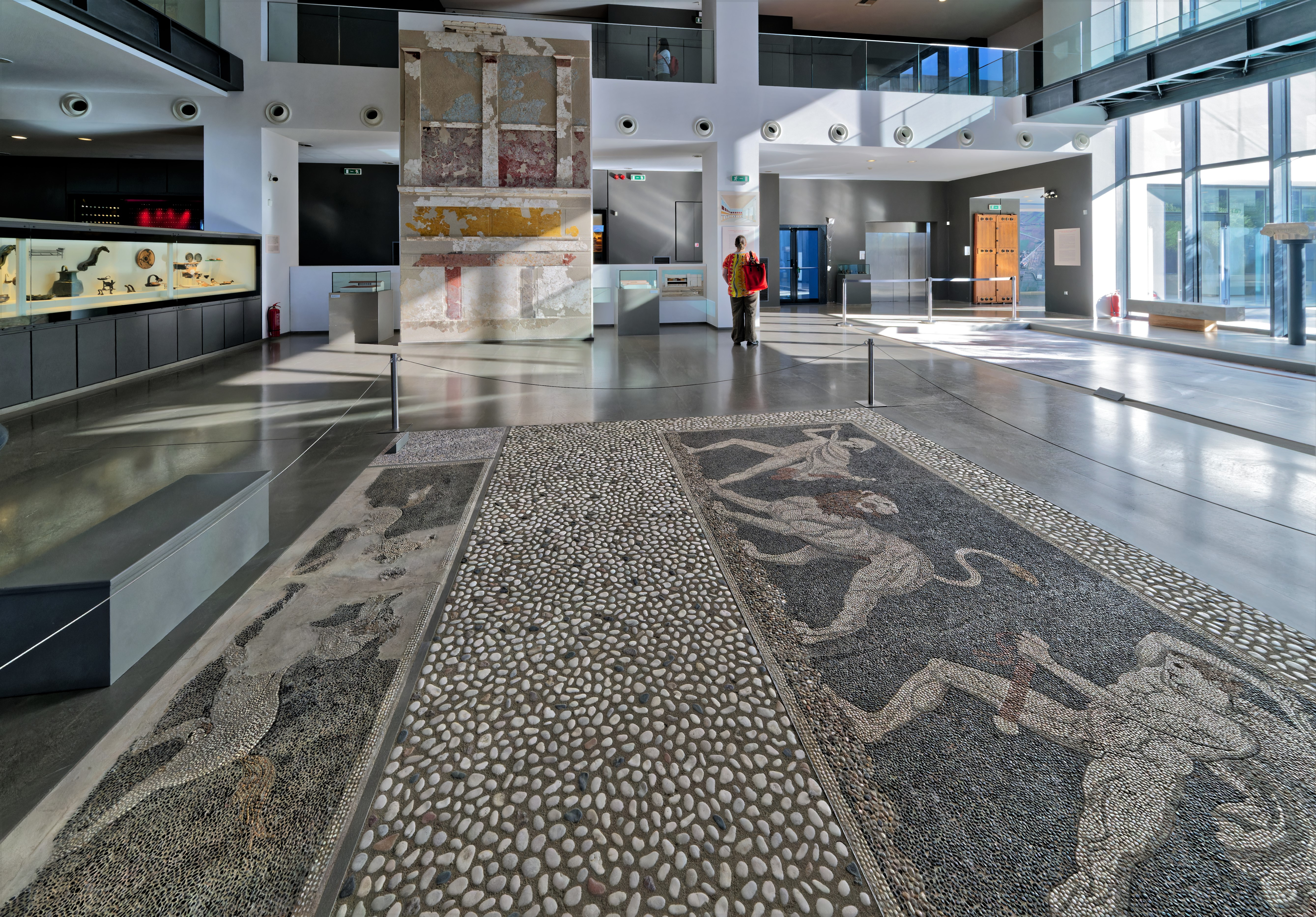
Entrance hall

The Archaeological Museum of Pella (Greek: Αρχαιολογικό Μουσείο Πέλλας) is a museum in Pella in the Pella regional unit of Central Macedonia. The building was designed by architect Kostas Skroumpellos and is on the site of the ancient city of Pella. It was completed in 2009 with the support of the Greece's Third Community Support Framework.

== Description ==
It is situated near the archaeological site of the ancient Macedonian palace. The building has a rectangular atrium, as a reference to the central peristyle courtyard of ancient houses in Pella.

The information section provides texts, photographs, maps, drawings a model of the archaeological site and a short video about Pella. In the entrance there are two important exhibits: A head considered a portrait of Alexander the Great and a statuette with the characteristic attributes of the god Pan.

The daily life of Pella is the first thematic group of the exhibition. The most important exhibits are the mosaic floors from the Houses of Dionysus, and of the Abduction of Helen from the House of the Wall Plasters. The excavation finds provide much information about daily life in ancient Pella (restoration of furniture and models, cloths, etc.)

The second thematic group is about public life in Pella. The finds come from excavations in the Agora and are related to the city's administration (coins, inscriptions, sculpture), the production and commerce (vases for transporting wines terracotta figurines, equipment from pottery).

The third thematic group consists of mosaics from Pella's sanctuaries (the sanctuaries of Darron, the Mother of Gods and Aphrodite, the Thesmophorion), and other findings as inscriptions, vases, metal objects.

The fourth thematic group is the findings from the city's cemeteries. There are burials from the Bronze Age, the Iron Age, Geometric and Archaic periods (9th-6th BC centuries), the Classical era (5th-4th BC centuries), and the Hellenistic period (3rd, 2nd BC centuries). The findings give information about the language of the residents (Doric Greek language), the funeral customs etc.

The last grouping is the palace gallery and presents information about the architectural form of the palace, and the life and personality of Alexander the Great.

== Gallery ==
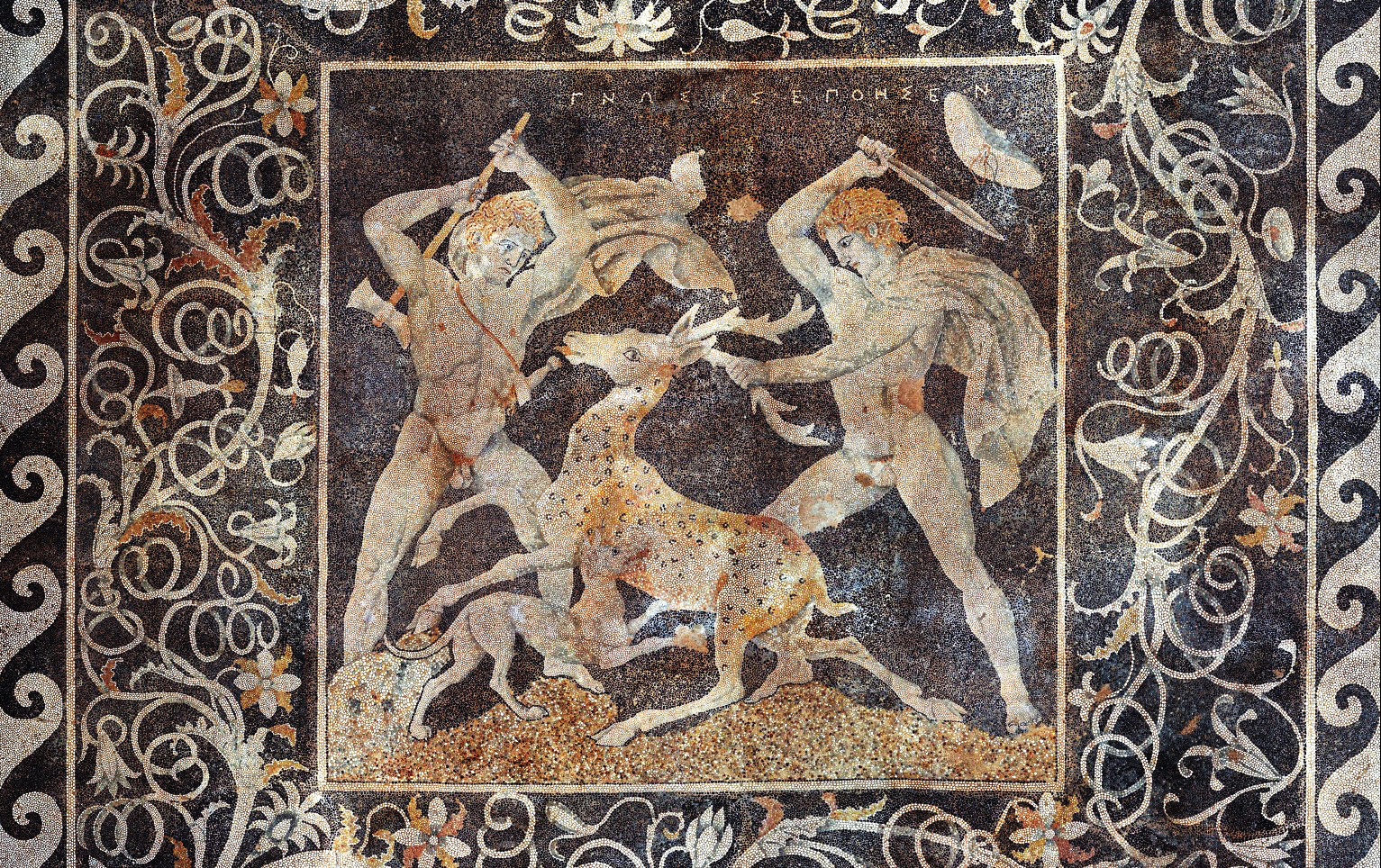
The Stag Hunt Mosaic
(c. 300 BC)

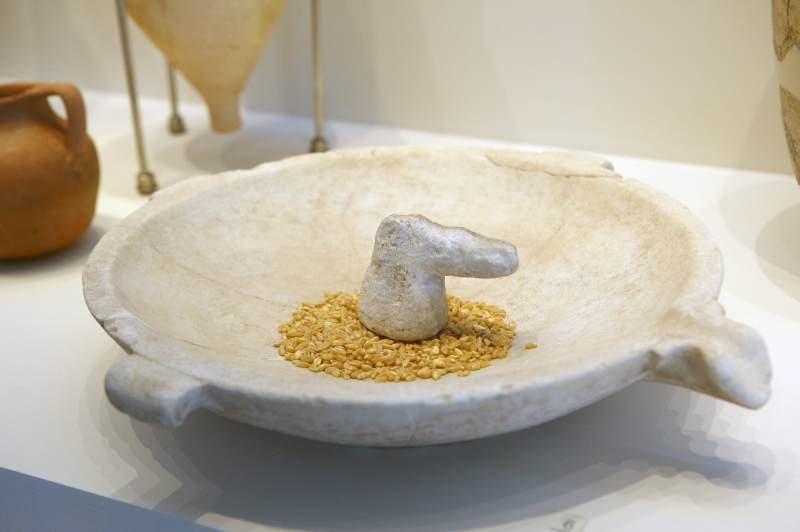
Small food bowls from a cupboard in an ancient house (late 4th-early 1st BC century)

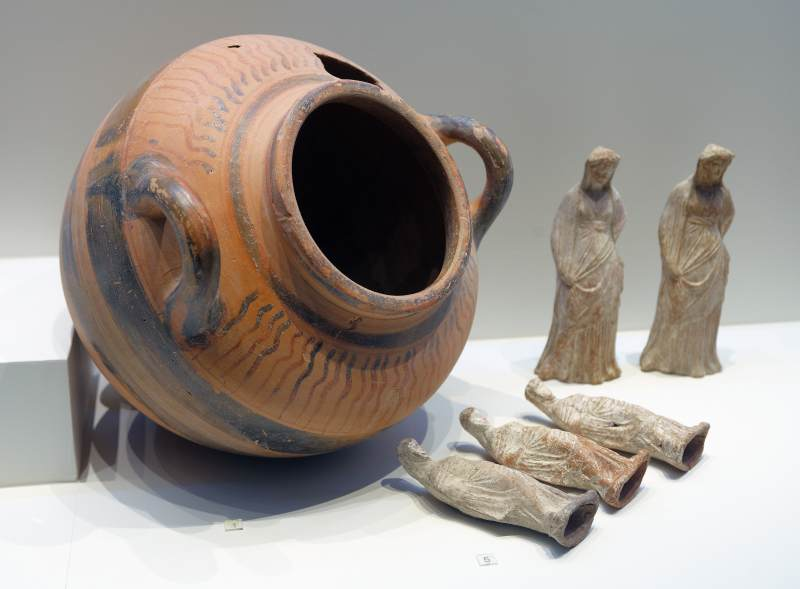
Cremation mid 5th century. Storage vessel used as an um. Female terracotta figurine

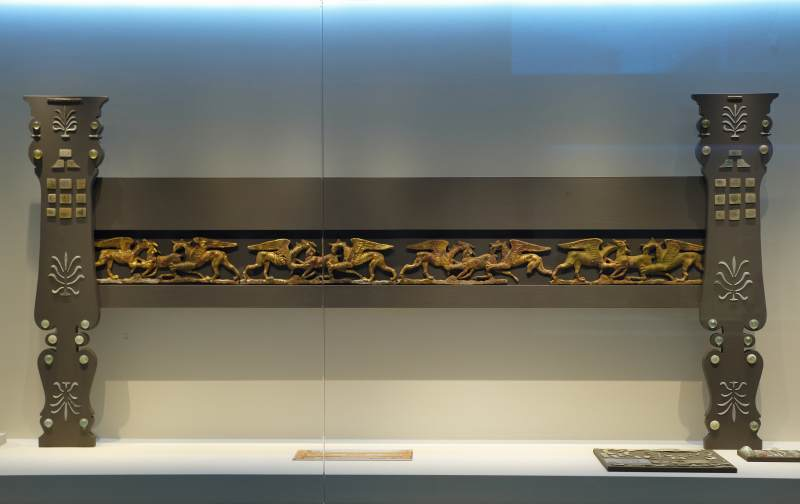
Elements of decoration of wooden burial couches and coffers

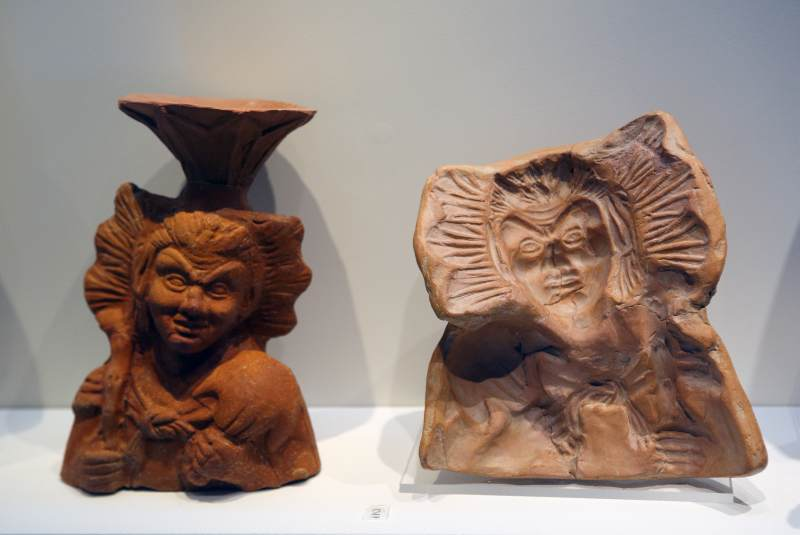
Mould of a Satyr and figure from the mould in the form of an incense burner

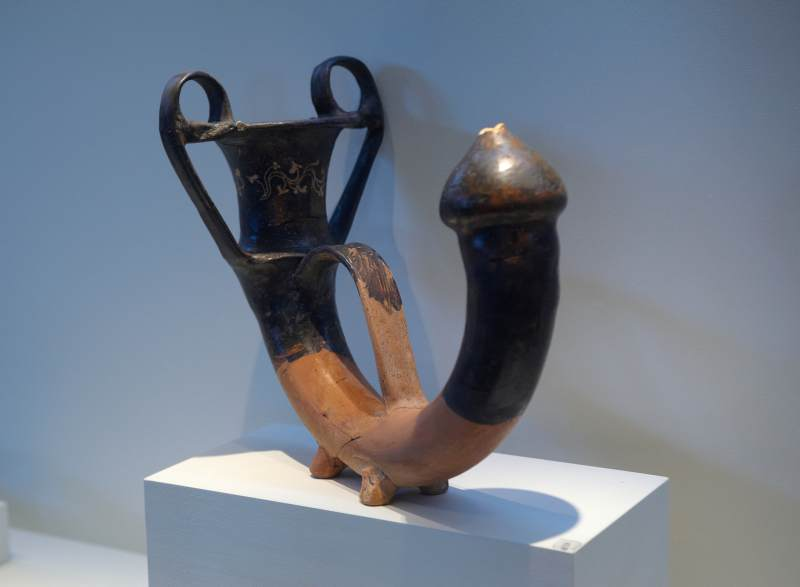
Rhyton in the form of phallus (drinking and libation vessel)

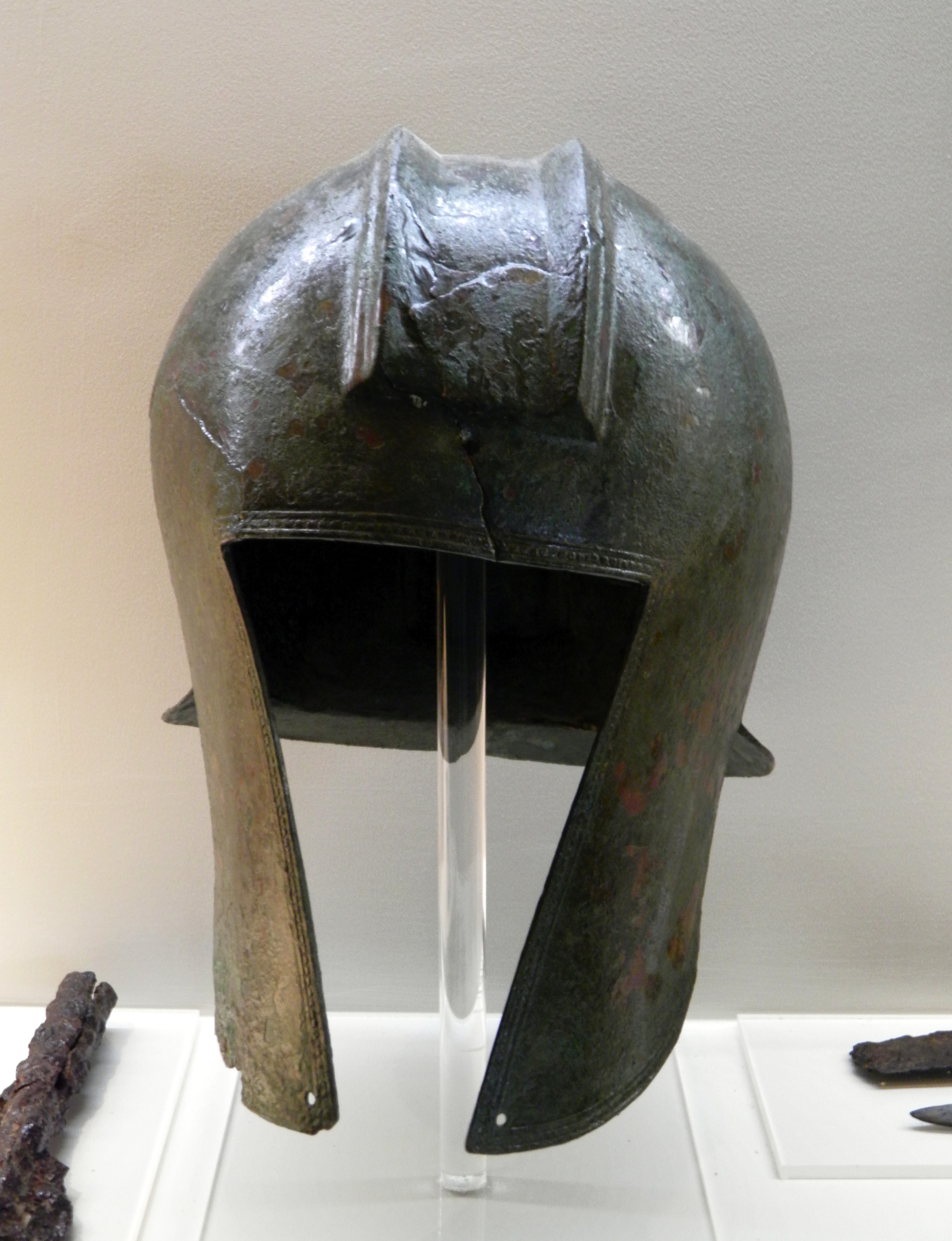
Bronze helmet

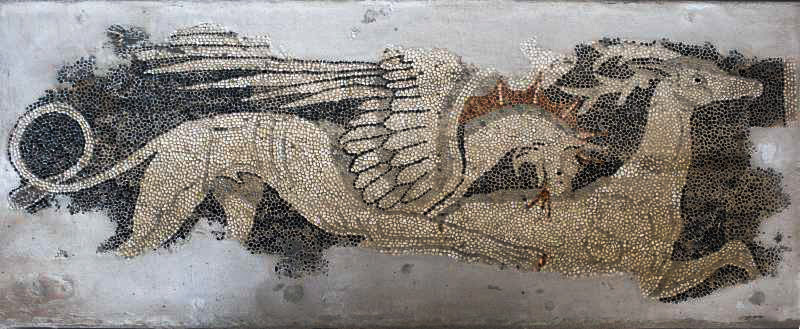
Detail from a mosaic 'Griffin attacking deer'

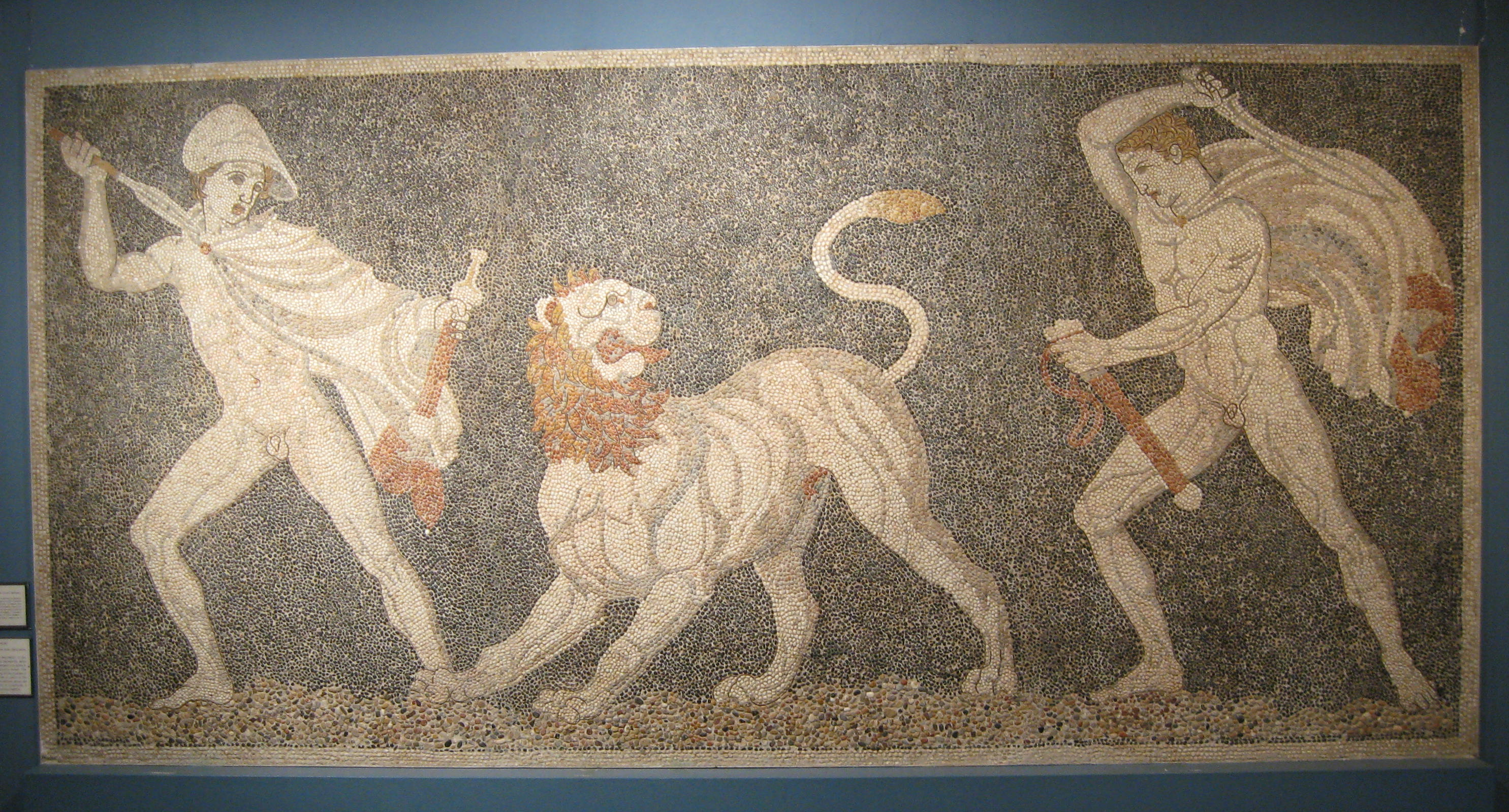
'Hunting a lion' mosaic

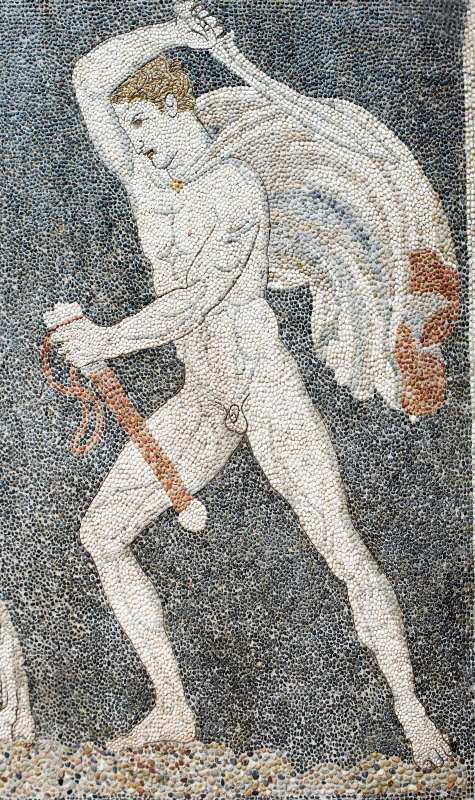
Detail from the mosaic

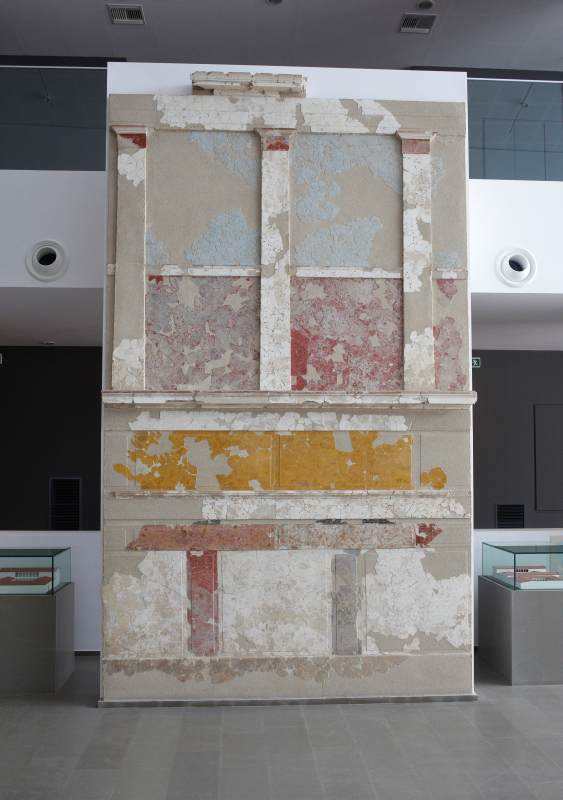
Decoration of the dining room wall in a house known as the house of the plasterworks

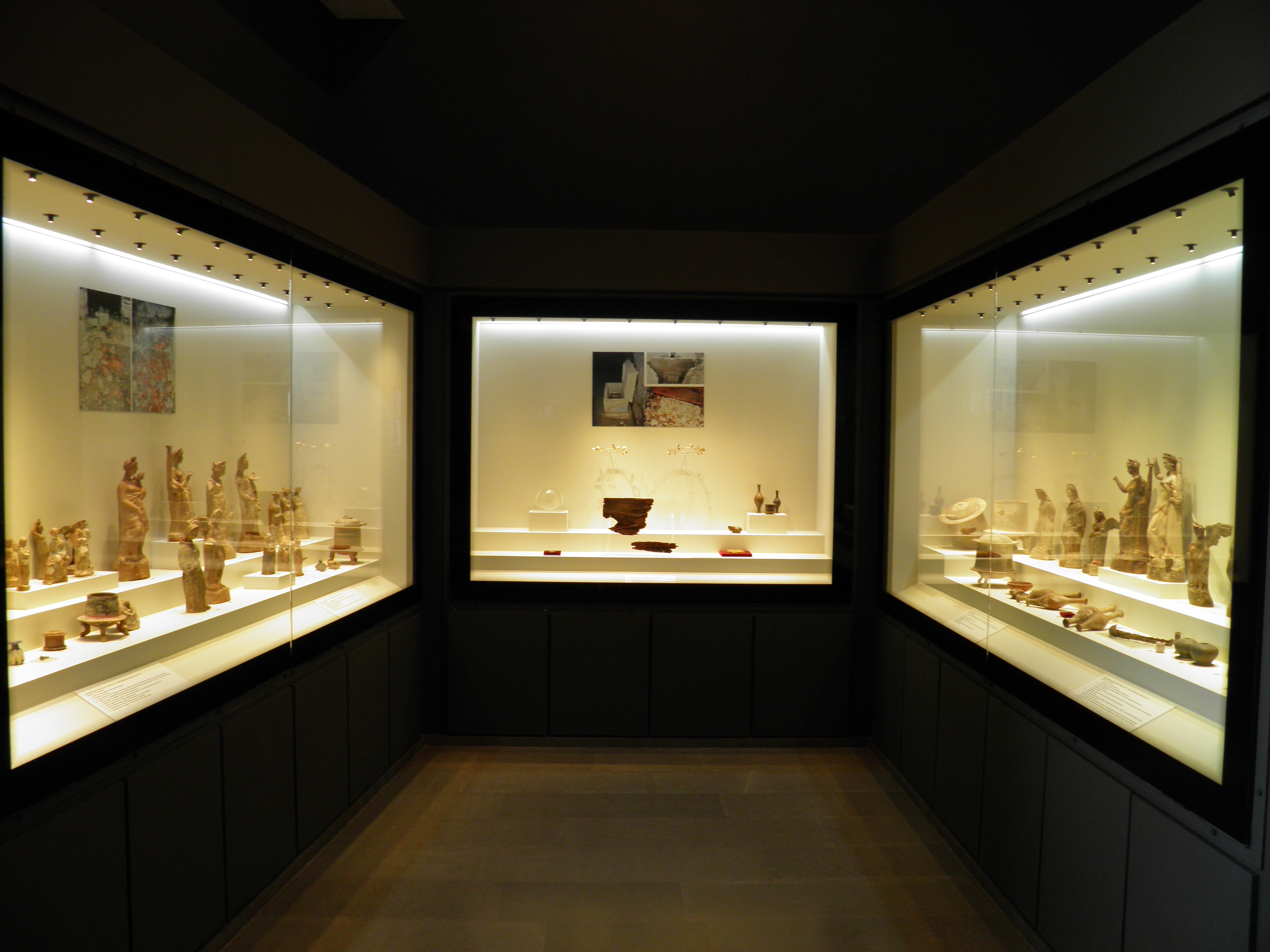
Exhibits

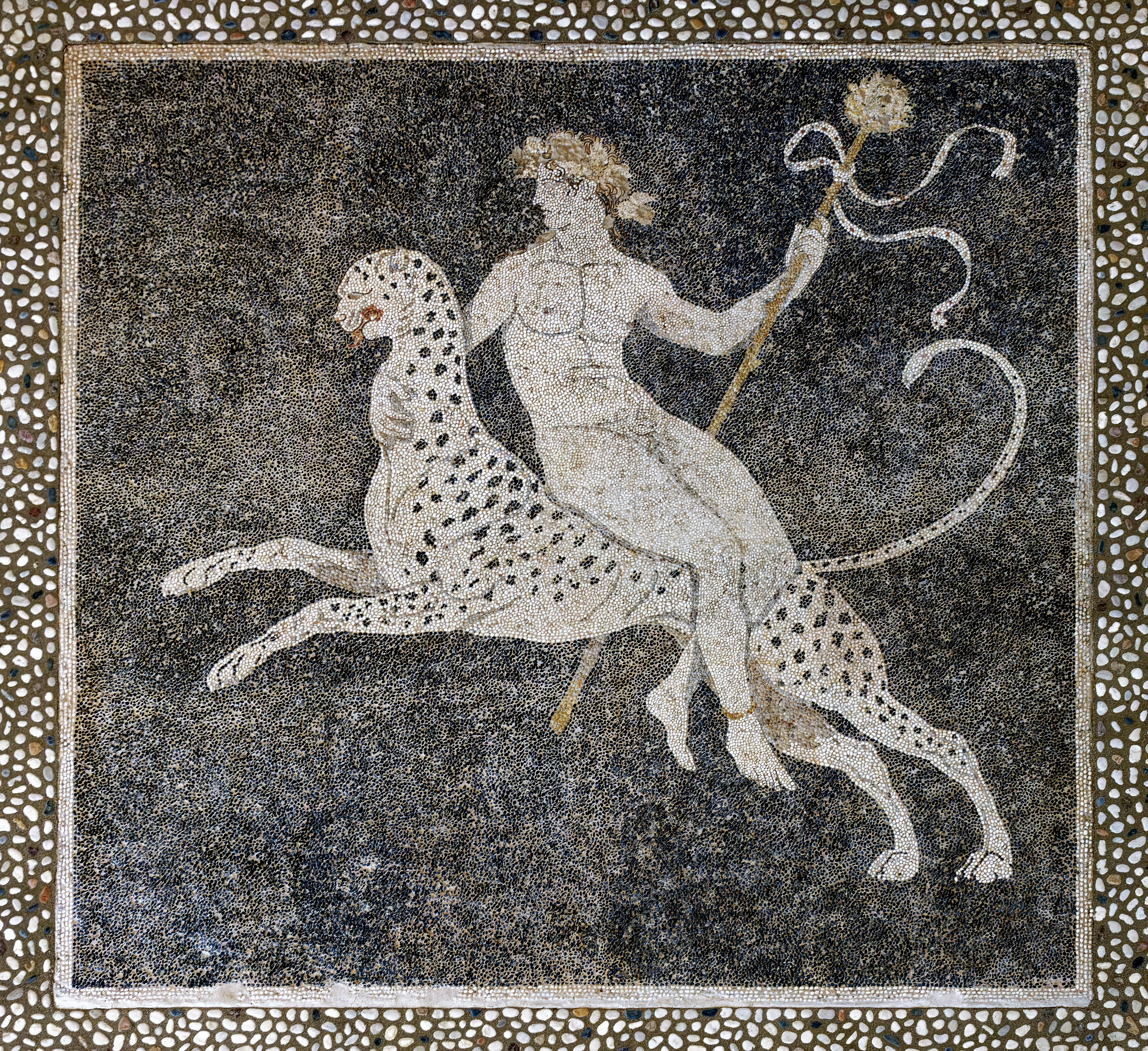
Dionysos mosaic

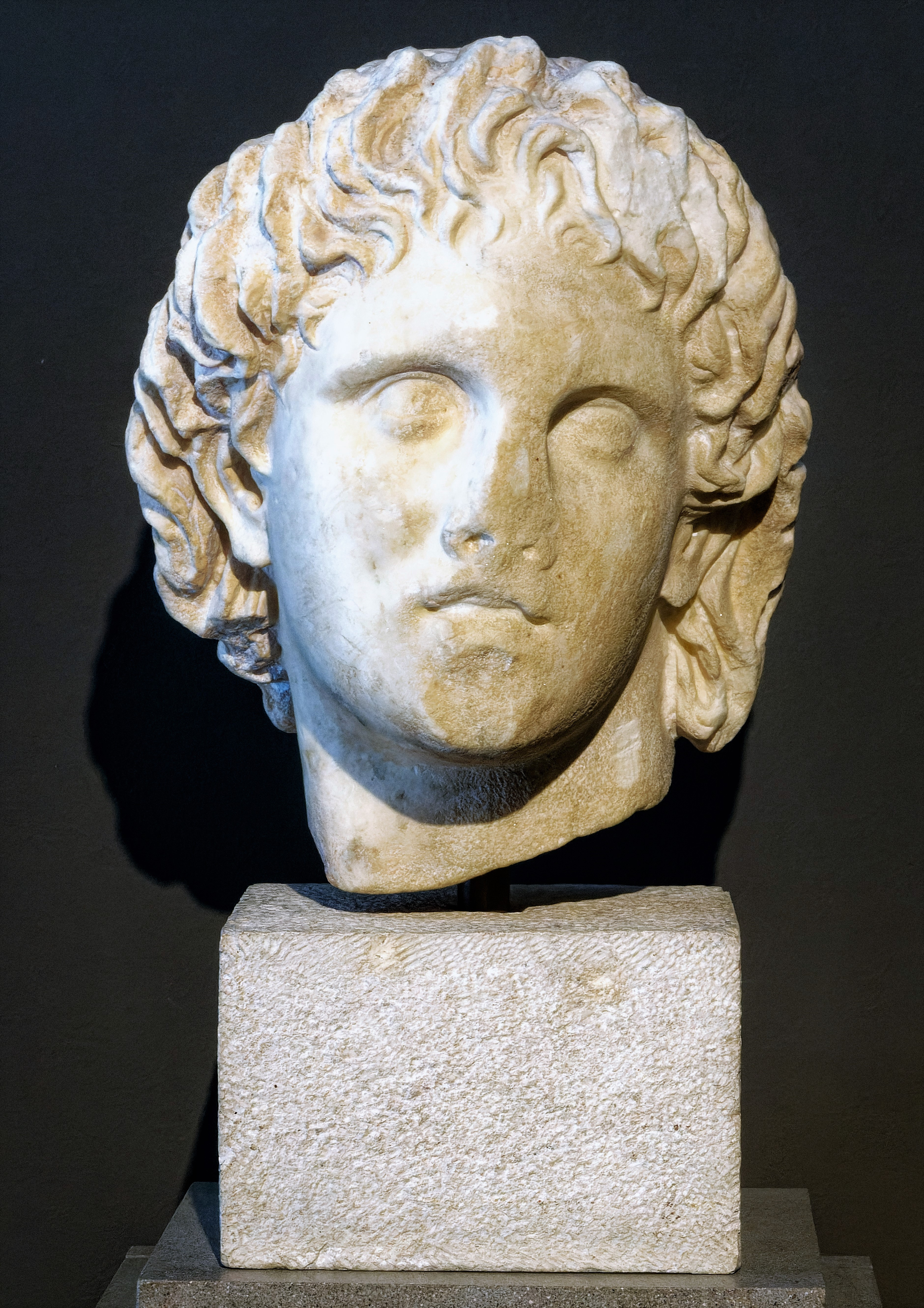
Marble head of Alexander the Great (325-300 BC). Chance find from the area of Giannitsa.

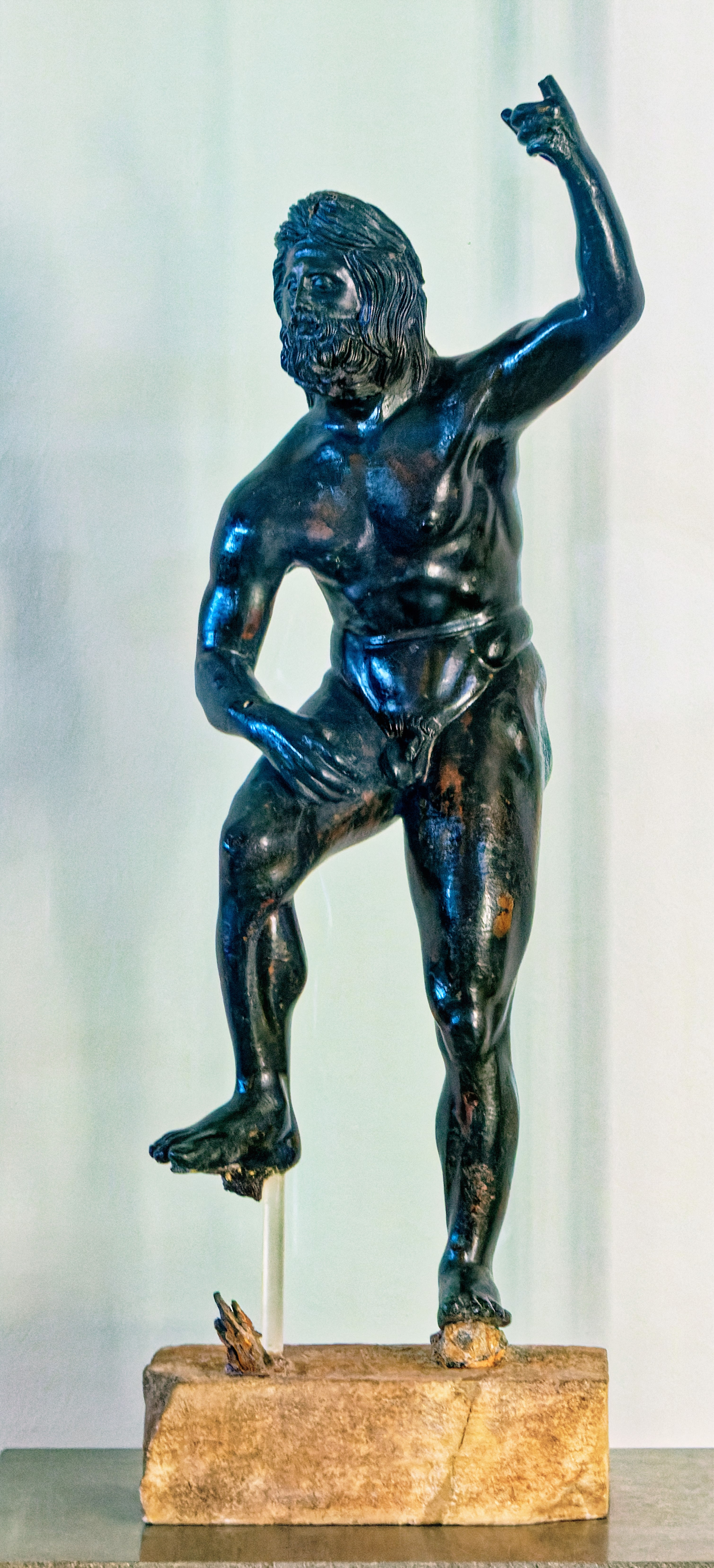
Poseidon bronze statuette

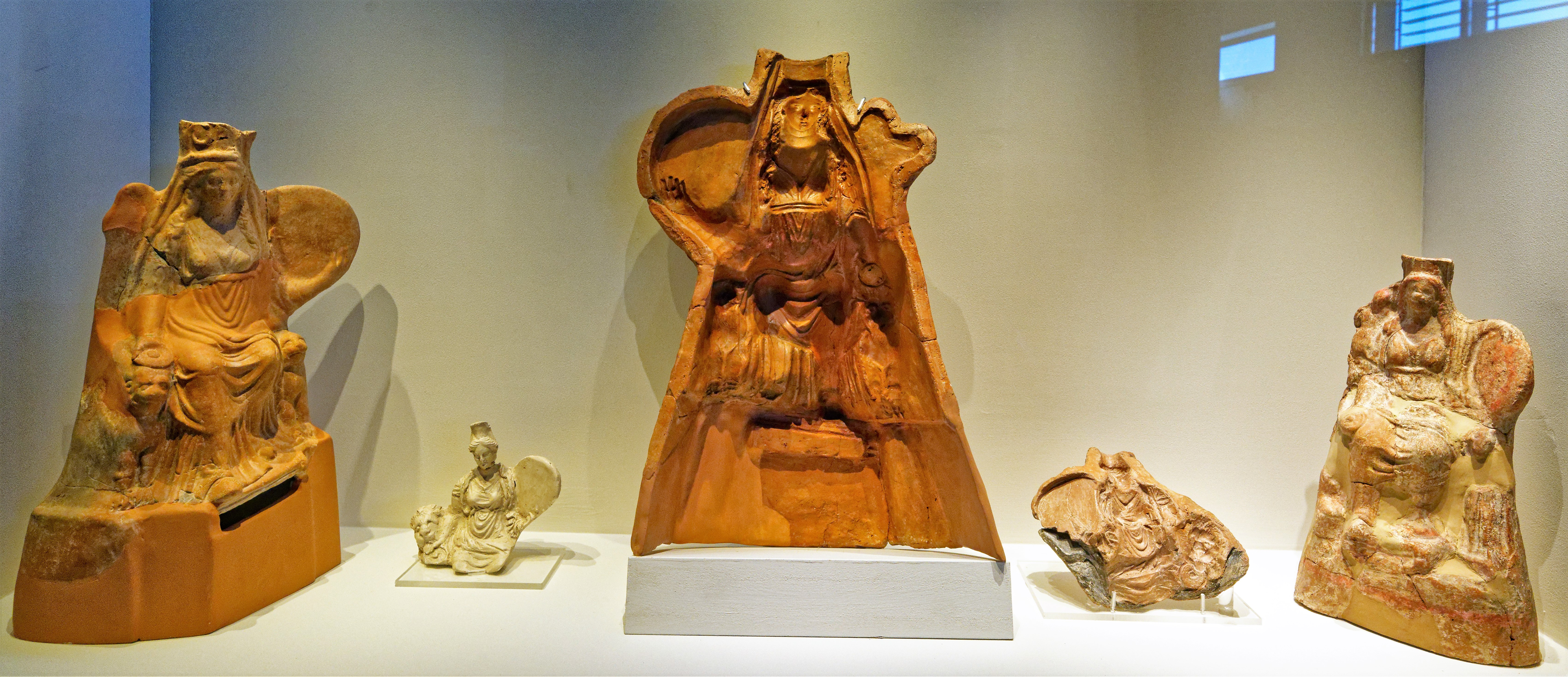
Exhibits

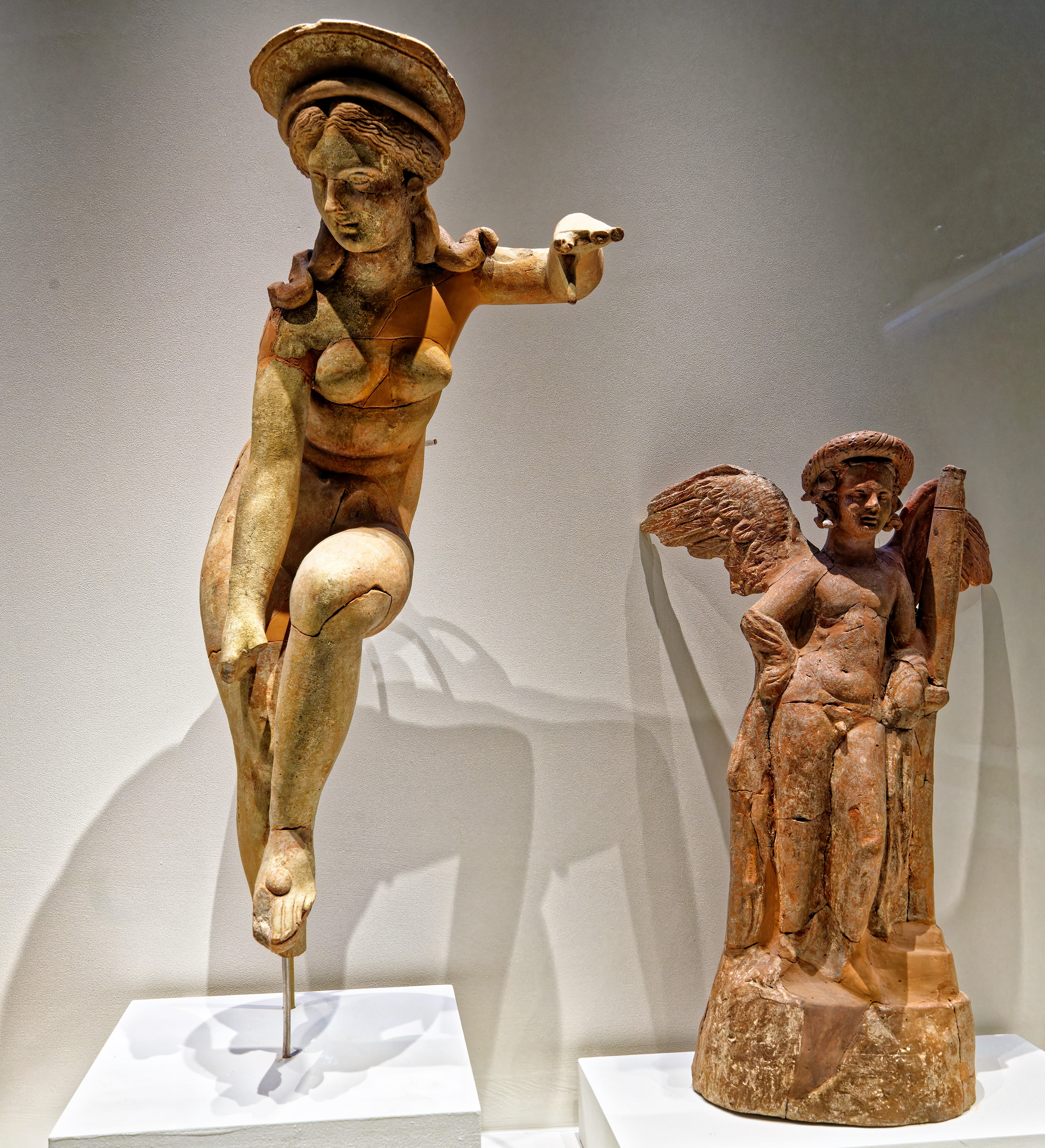
Terracotta figurine of Aphrodite removing her sandal. Votive offerings from the Sanctuary of the Mother of Gods and Aphrodite (late 4th-early 1st BC century)

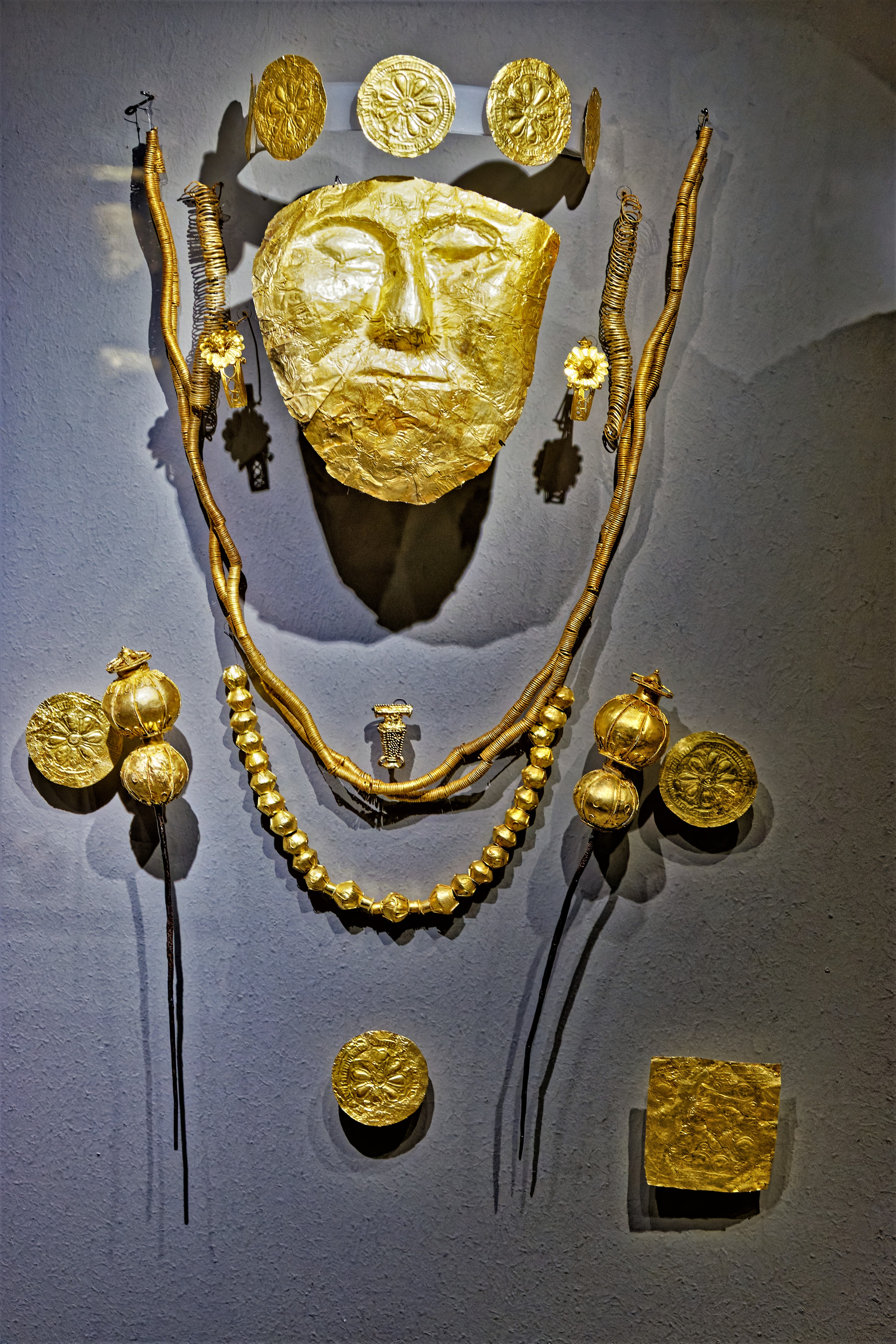
Gold mask

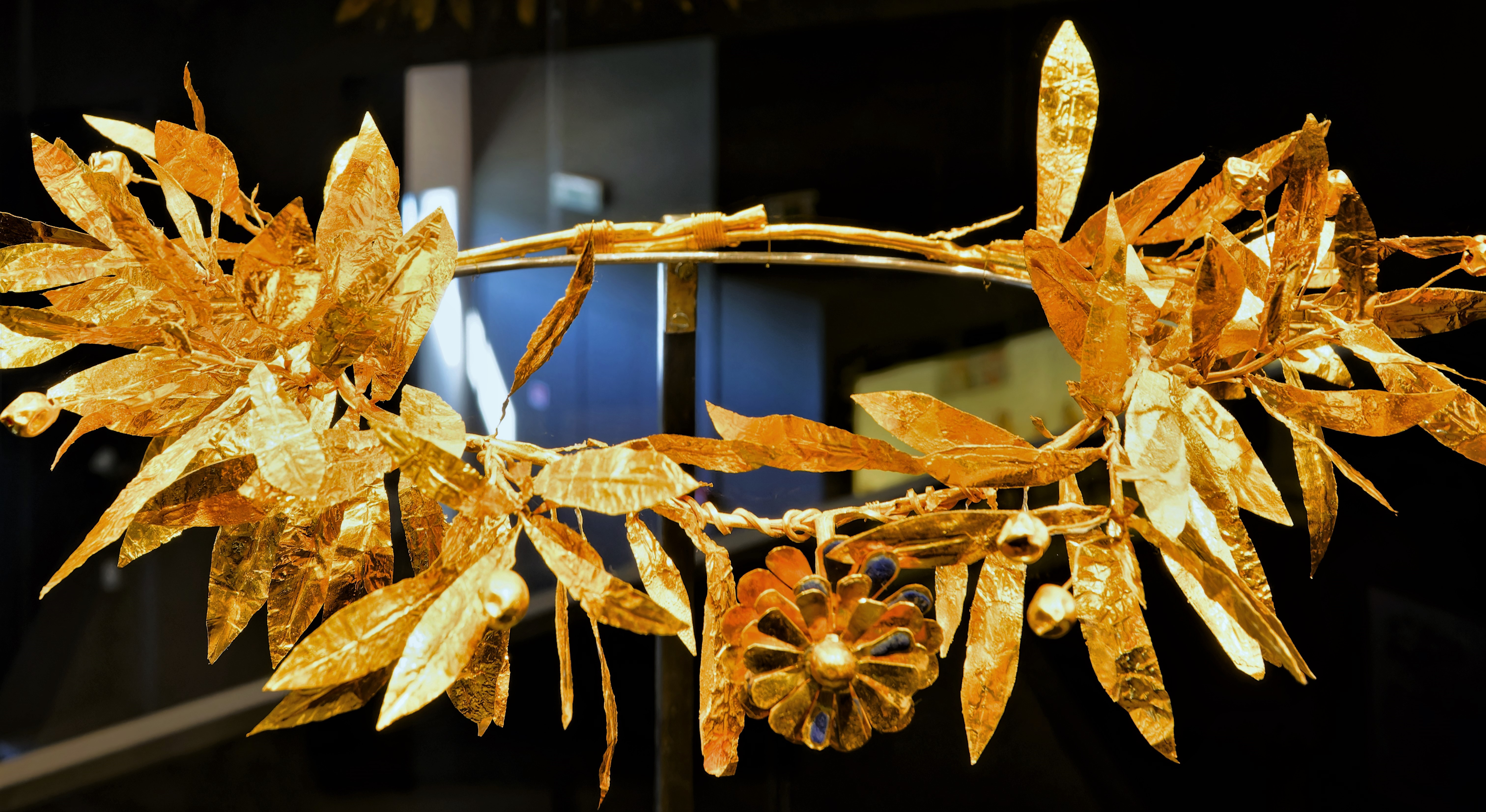
Gold jewellery

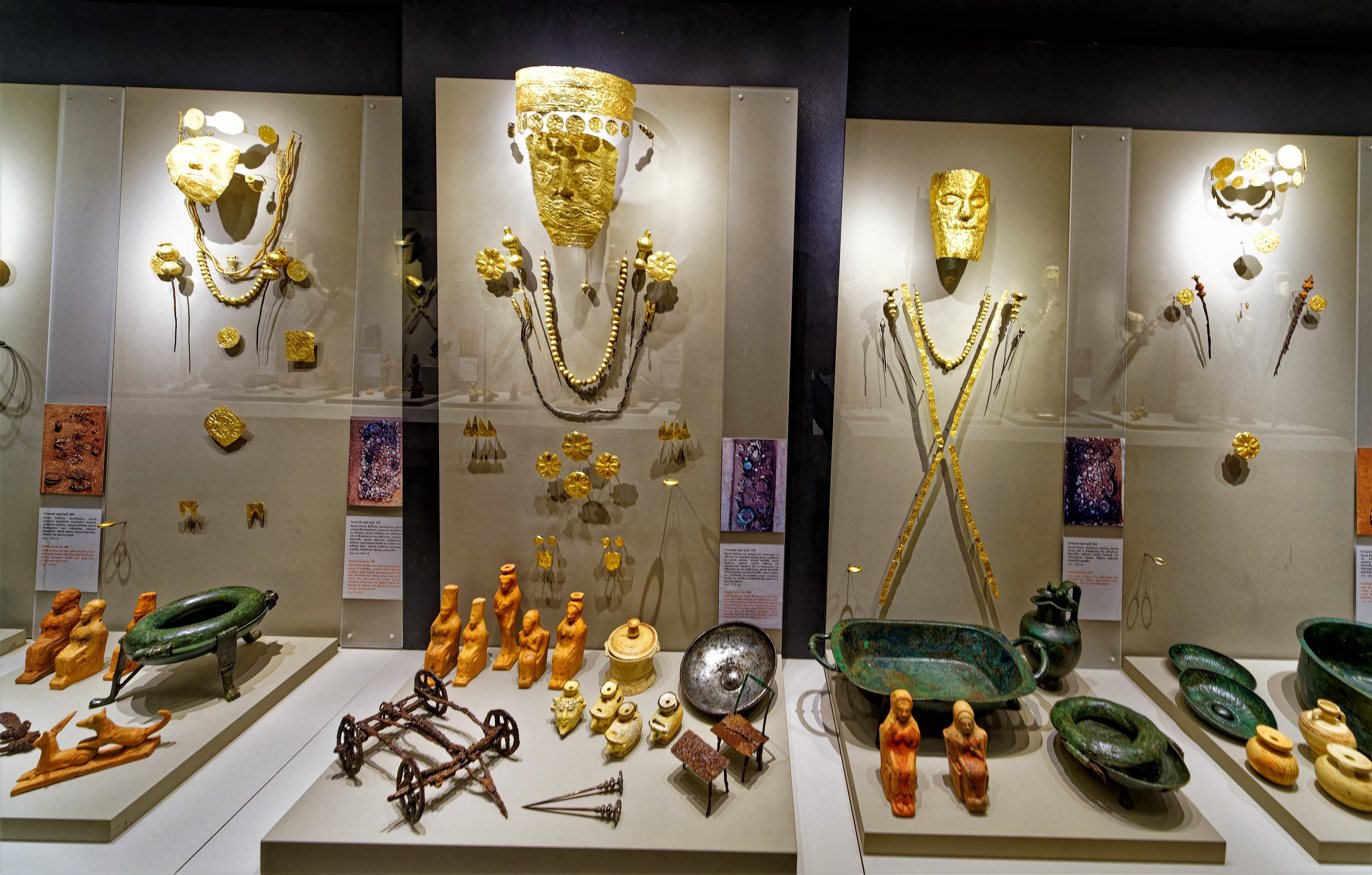
Grave goods

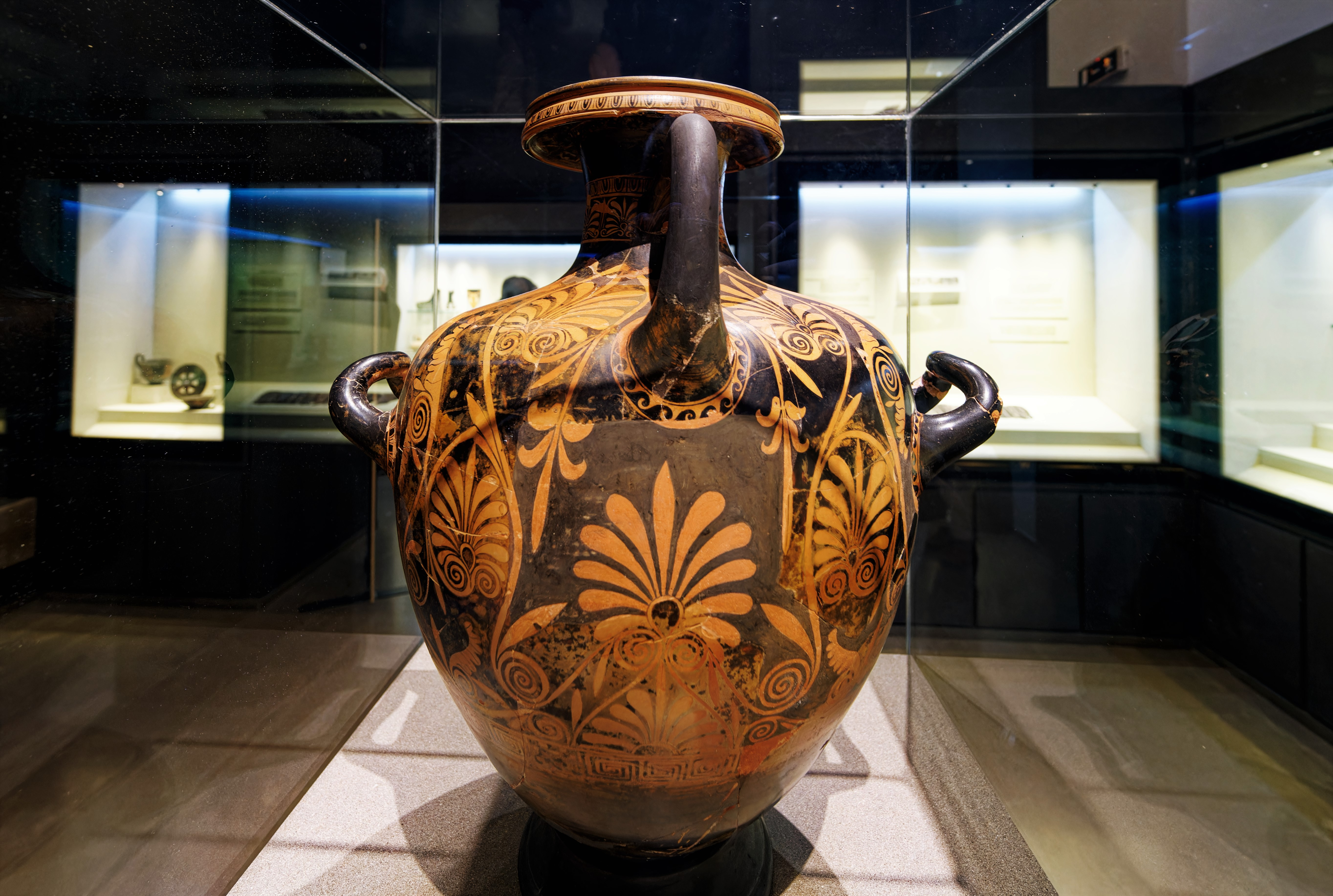
Pottery

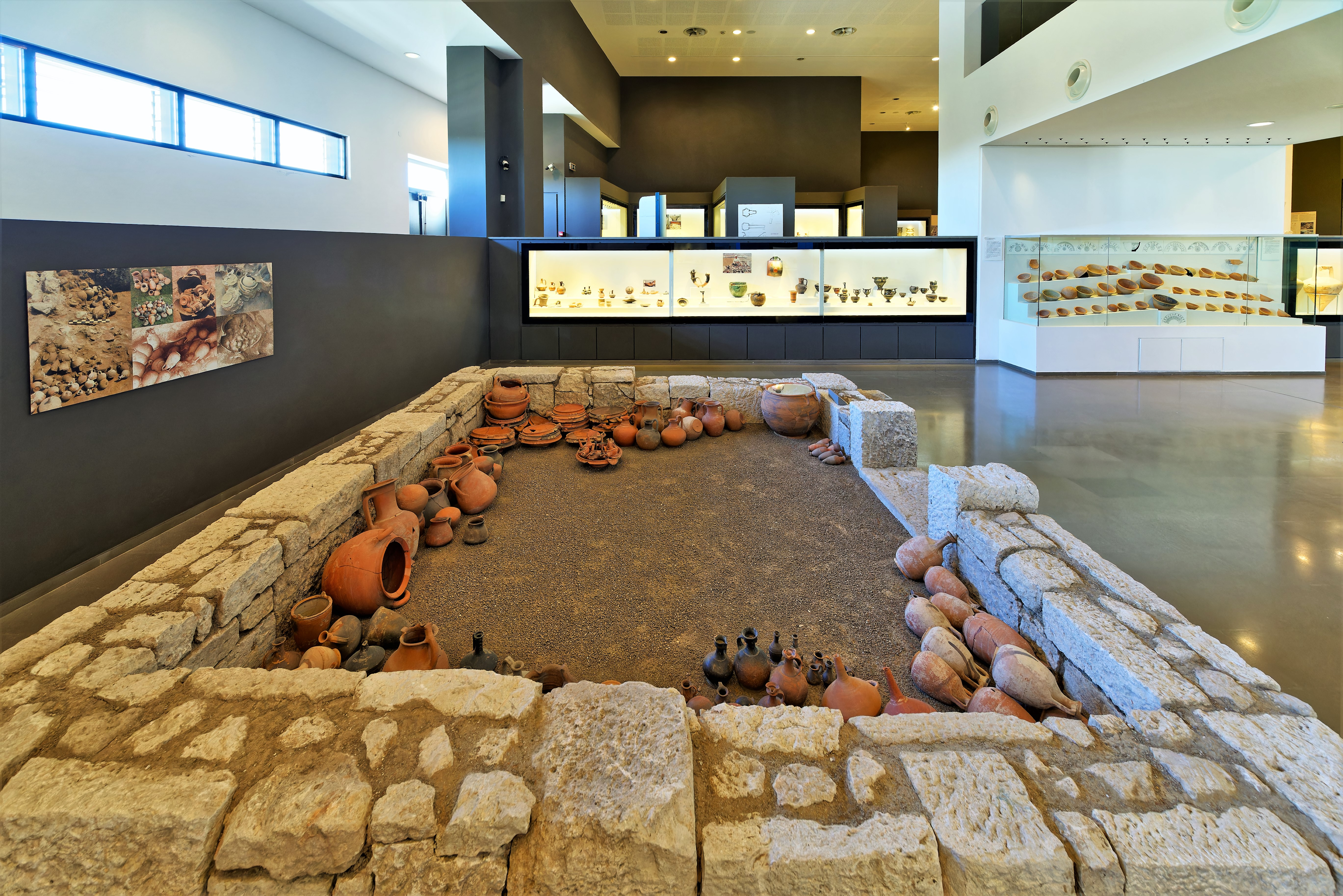
Pottery arbor

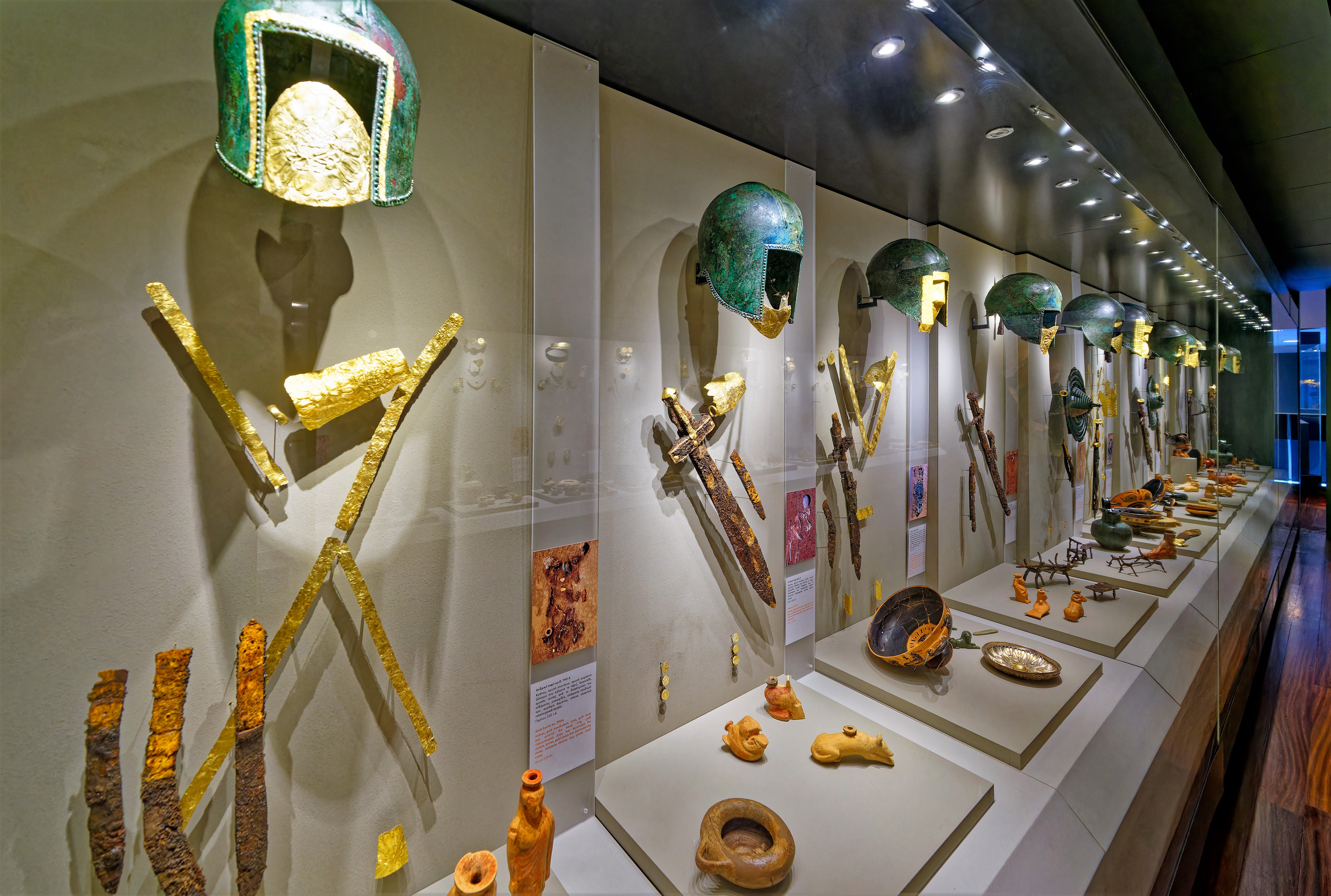
Weapons

== Sources ==
- This article incorporates text from the corresponding article at the Museums of Macedonia website, commissioned by the Macedonian Heritage foundation, written by Vlasis Vlasidis, and published under a CC-BY-SA-3.0 license.
