= Toma Karayovov =

Bulgarian diplomat and publicist

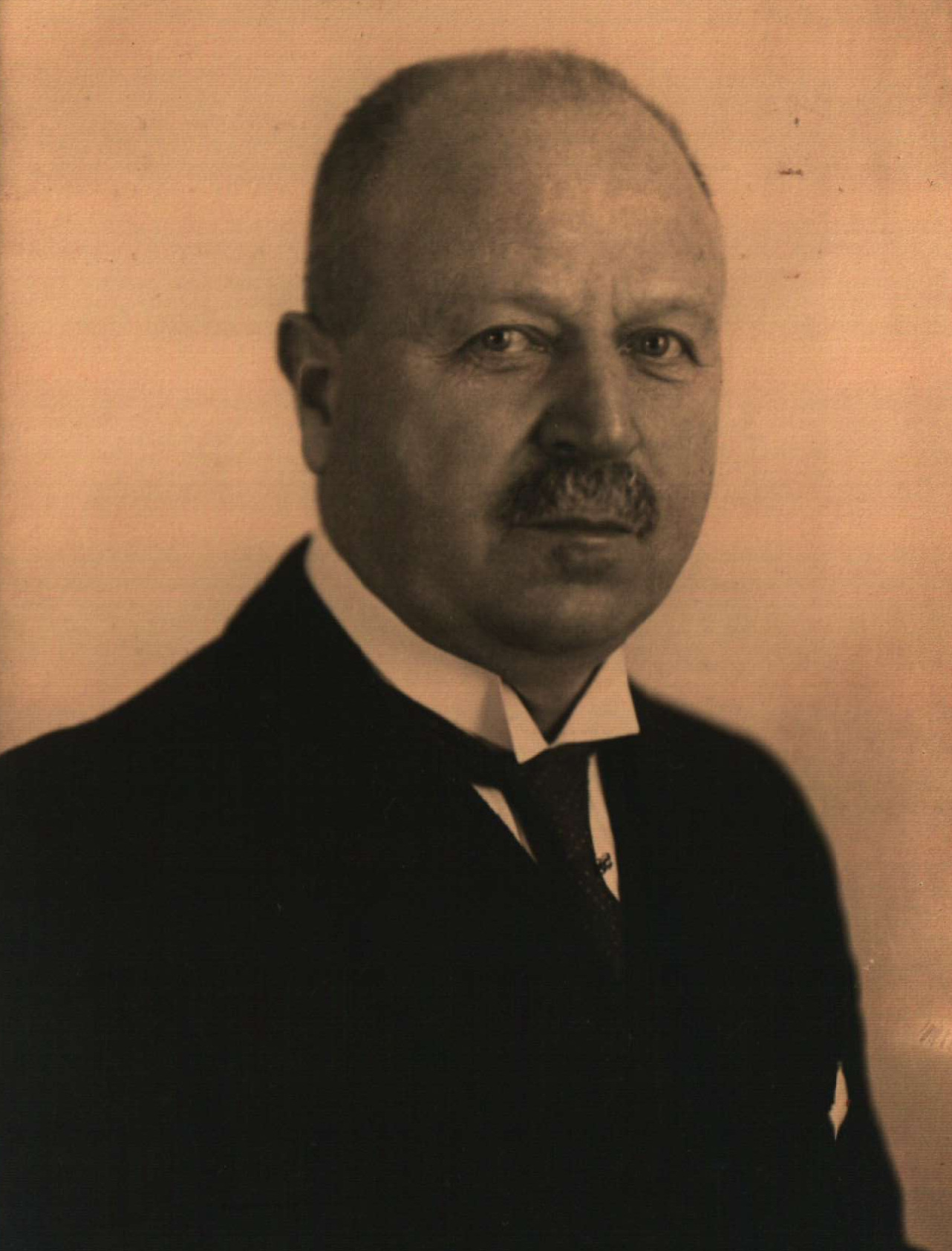
- Born: c. 1875; Skopje, Ottoman Empire
- Died: 2 December 1950; Sofia, Bulgaria

Toma Ivanov Karayovov (Bulgarian: Тома Иванов Карайовов) was a Bulgarian diplomat and publicist.

== Biography ==
Toma Karayovov was born c. 1875 in Skopje, Ottoman Empire. He graduated from the Bulgarian Men's High School of Thessaloniki and Law at Sofia University. From 1897 to 1900 he was secretary of the Bulgarian commercial agencies in Bitola and Edirne, of the diplomatic agencies in Vienna (1904-1905) and Rome (1907-1908). After the Young Turk Revolution initiated the establishment of the Bulgarian Constitutional Clubs and its chairman. After the First World War he is foreign representative of Internal Macedonian Revolutionary Organization (IMRO), one of the founders of the Macedonian Scientific Institute and a full member.

Toma Karayovov died in 1950 in Sofia, Bulgaria.
