= Stefan Asenov =

Bulgarian modern pentathlete (born 1972)

Personal information
- Born: 3 February 1972 (age 54) Sofia, Bulgaria

Sport
- Sport: Modern pentathlon

Stefan Asenov (Bulgarian: Стефан Асенов; born 3 February 1972) is a Bulgarian former modern pentathlete. He competed at the 1992 Summer Olympics.
