= Kyrros =

Kyrros Κύρρος
- Municipal unit
- Location within the regional unit

- Location within Greece
- Coordinates: 40°52′N 22°19′E
- Country: Greece
- Administrative region: Central Macedonia
- Regional unit: Pella
- Municipality: Pella

Area
  - Municipal unit: 181.4 km^{2} (70.0 sq mi)

Population (2021)
  - Municipal unit: 5,680
  - Municipal unit density: 31.3/km^{2} (81.1/sq mi)
- Time zone: UTC+2 (EET)
  - Summer (DST): UTC+3 (EEST)
- Vehicle registration: ΕΕ

Kyrros (Greek: Κύρρος; in classical contexts also transliterated Cyrrhus) is a former municipality in the Pella regional unit, Greece. Since the 2011 local government reform it is part of the municipality Pella, of which it is a municipal unit. The municipal unit has an area of 181.415 km^{2}. Population 5,680 (2021). The seat of the municipality was in Mylotopos. The municipality took its name from the ancient Macedonian town Cyrrhus, which was located near ancient Pella.
