= Asenov, Veliko Tarnovo =

District and neighbourhood of Veliko Tarnovo, Bulgaria

Coordinates: 43.0865°N 25.6499°E

Asenov (Bulgarian: Асенов) is a district and neighbourhood of Veliko Tarnovo, Bulgaria.

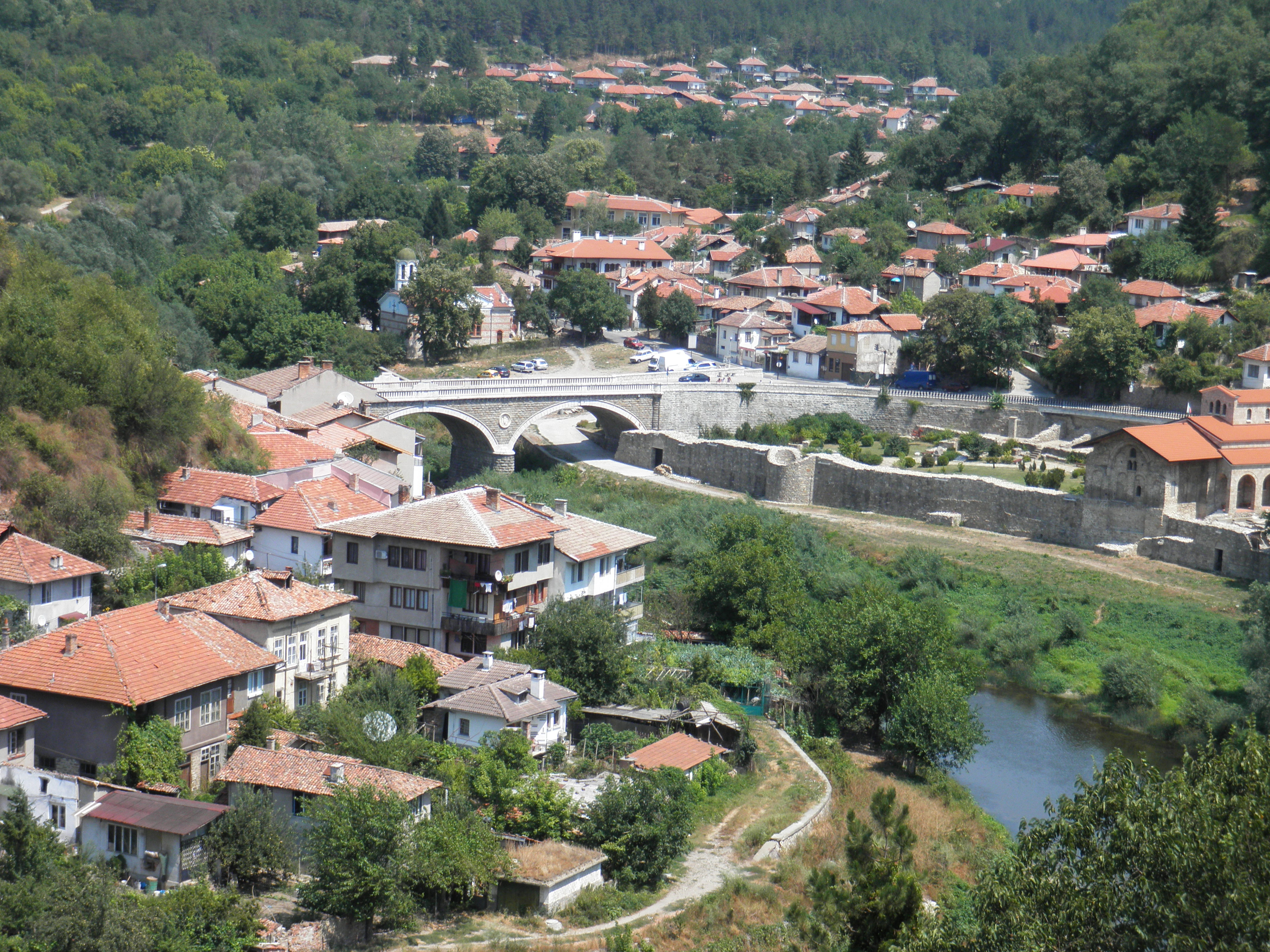

== History ==
During the Second Bulgarian State, the so-called Nov grad (New town) was established between the main fortress hills of Tsarevets, Trapezitsa and Momina Krepost. During this period, the population of the neighborhood was composed mainly of Bulgarians. During this period the Vladishki most was built. Until 1880, Asenov was a mahala - Asenova mahala (neighbourhood) of Tarnovo. In Asenova mahala there was a Greek school during the Renaissance. There were tabahani on the left bank of the Yantra. That is why the log in some registers was known as Tabashka mahala. The teacher Nedyu Zhekov initiated the creation of the Culture center "Trapezitsa" in 1879.
