= Pella (town) =

Town in Central Macedonia, Greece

Pella Πέλλα
- Municipal unit
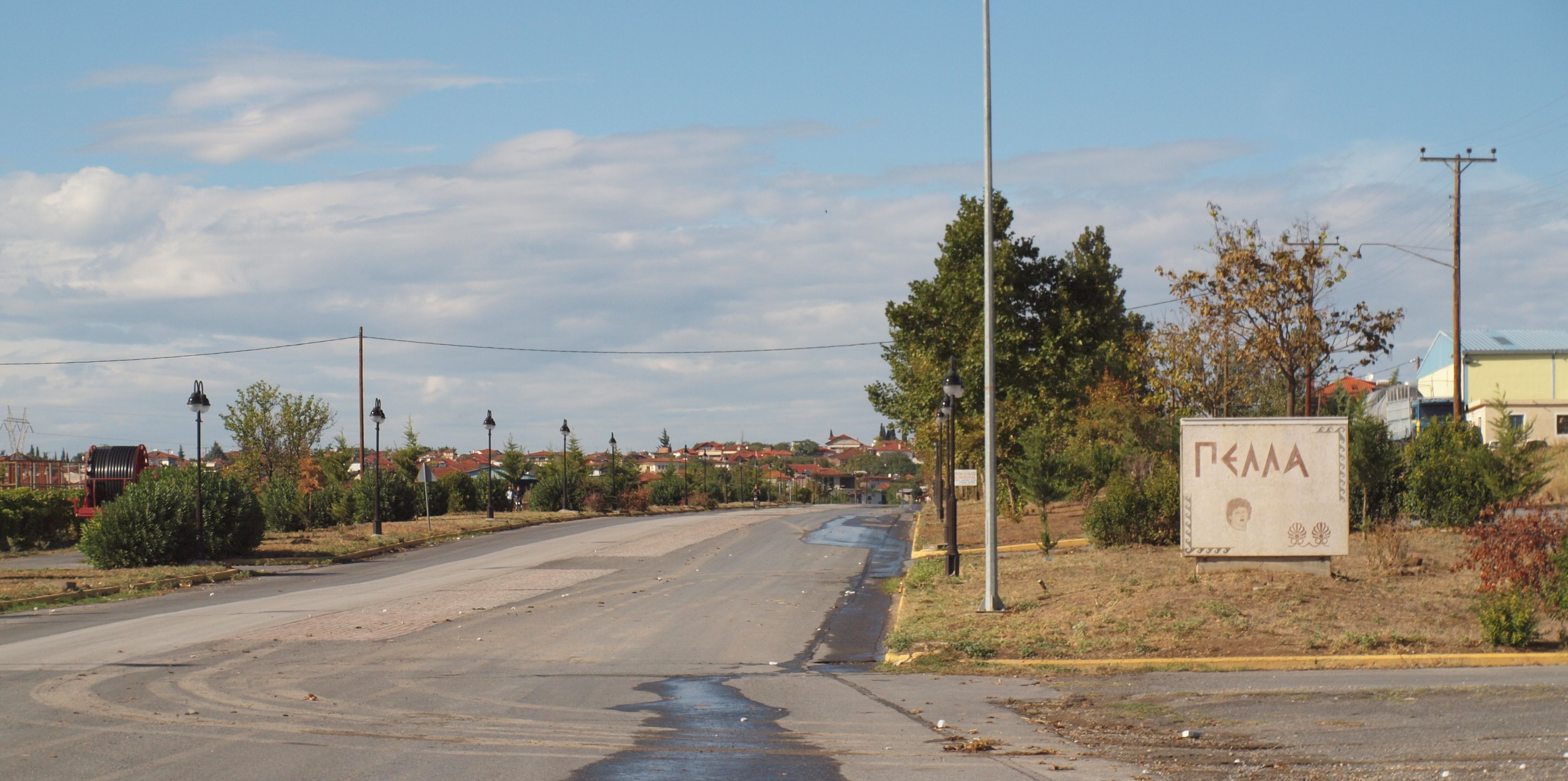
- Town sign

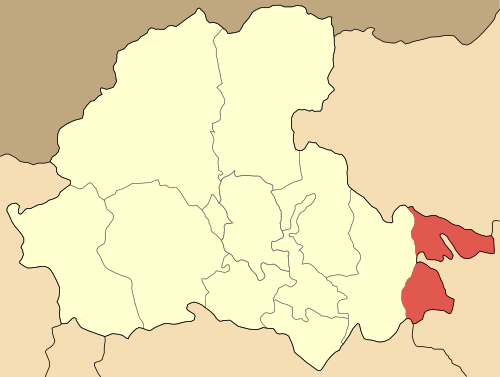

- Location within Greece
- Coordinates: 40°48′N 22°31′E
- Country: Greece
- Administrative region: Central Macedonia
- Regional unit: Pella
- Municipality: Pella

Area
  - Municipal unit: 113.8 km^{2} (43.9 sq mi)
  - Community: 30.09 km^{2} (11.62 sq mi)
- Elevation: 36 m (118 ft)

Population (2021)
  - Municipal unit: 5,661
  - Municipal unit density: 49.75/km^{2} (128.8/sq mi)
  - Community: 2,050
  - Community density: 68.1/km^{2} (176/sq mi)
- Time zone: UTC+2 (EET)
  - Summer (DST): UTC+3 (EEST)
- Postal code: 580 05
- Area code: 23820
- Vehicle registration: ΕΕ

Pella (Greek: Πέλλα) is a town in the Pella municipality in the Pella regional unit of Macedonia, Greece. Pella is built on a hill at a distance of one kilometre from the road Thessaloniki - Edessa and the archeological site of ancient Pella, and 7 km from Giannitsa. The community of Pella has an area of 30.09 km^{2}, and a population of 2,050 inhabitants (2021). The municipal unit covers 113.819 km^{2}.

== History ==
It is located on the site of ancient Pella, the capital of the Kingdom of Macedonia and birthplace of Alexander the Great. Ancient Pella was a vast city. However, the city was ravaged by the Romans during the 2nd Century BC and lost its significance. During the Byzantine and Ottoman periods, the town was known in Greek as Άγιοι Απόστολοι (Agioi Apostoloi) 'Holy Apostles' and in Ottoman Turkish as Allah Kilise 'God's Church'. In the local Slavic language, the name is Postol (Постол). The name Pella was revived in 1926. By the 19th century, Agii Apostoli occupied a site near the upper city, and the lower city extended down to the wetlands of Mavroneri. Félix de Beaujour, a French consul of Thessaloniki at the end of the 18th century, wrote in his travels for the Ottoman Empire: "Pella rises amphitheatrically on the slope of a hill on the top of which was the fortress, at the present is a little village of Alla Klise, populated with Bulgarians." A survey by Vasil Kanchov in 1900 revealed that the population of Pella consisted of 520 Bulgarian Christians. The village joined the Bulgarian Exarchate. Another survey in 1905 recorded that in the village there were 720 Bulgarian Exarchists. During the exchange of populations with the Treaty of Lausanne (July 24, 1923) refugees from Eastern Thrace in modern Turkey arrived in Pella. Refugees from Bulgaria arrived in 1918 -1924. Finally, about 50 Sarakatsani families came to the village in 1947, coming from the areas of Florina. Many of its inhabitants emigrated to Bulgaria at that time.

== Notable people ==
- Aleksa Mindov, activist of the Thessaloniki Bulgarian club
- Andon Traykov, soldier in the Macedonian-Adrianopolitan Volunteer Corps
- Krste Misirkov, (1874 - 1926), philologist, journalist, historian and ethnographer
- Theodora Tzakri, Member of Parliament of Greece
- Yordana Slatinkova (1924 – 1948), female communist fighter in the Greek Civil War
- Anastasios (Tasos) Kakamanoudis, (1985-present), Greek archeologist
