= Pella (municipality) =

Pella Πέλλα
- Municipality
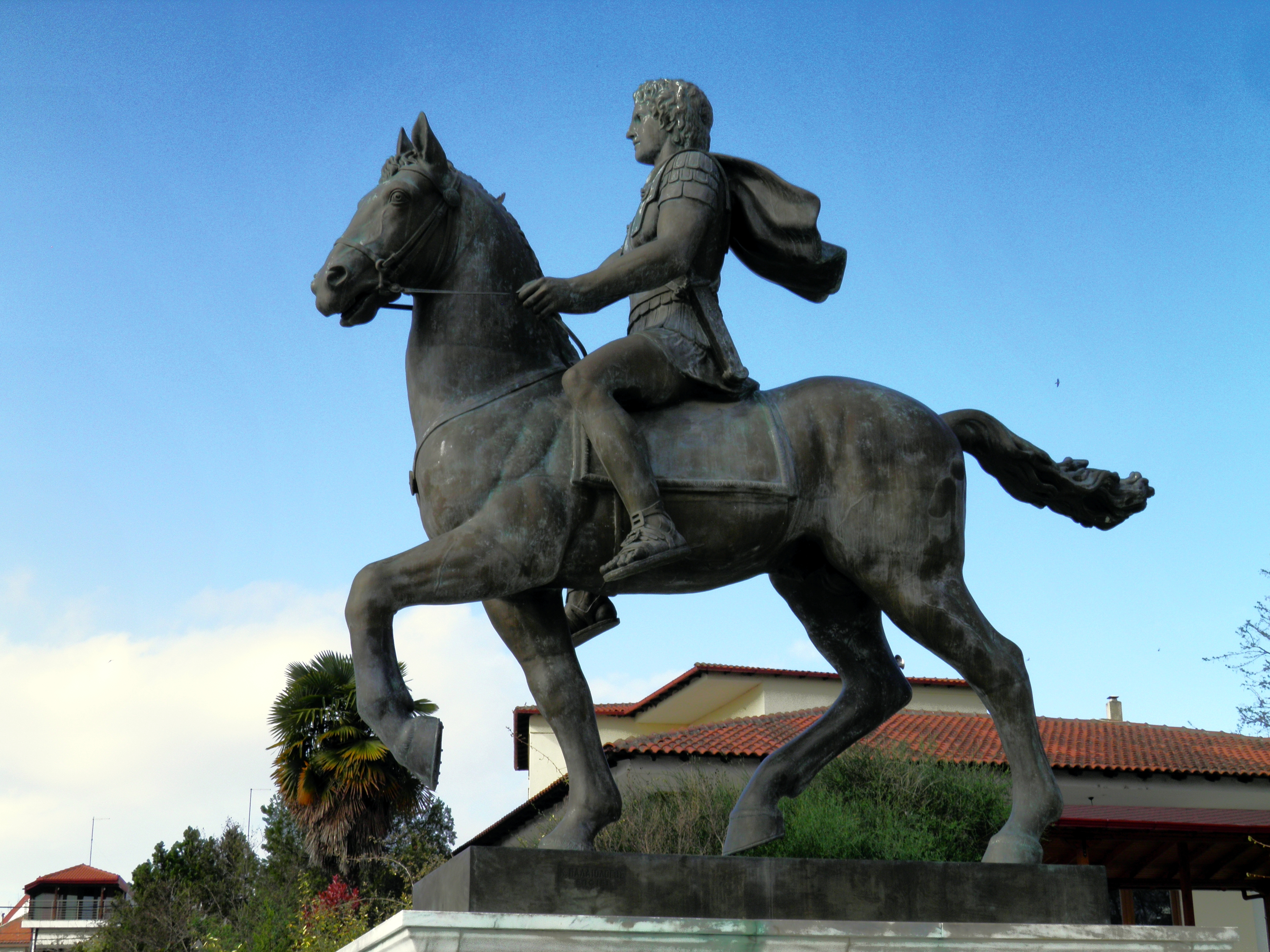
- Statue of Alexander the Great riding Bucephalus and carrying a winged statue of Nike (Alexander the Great Square).

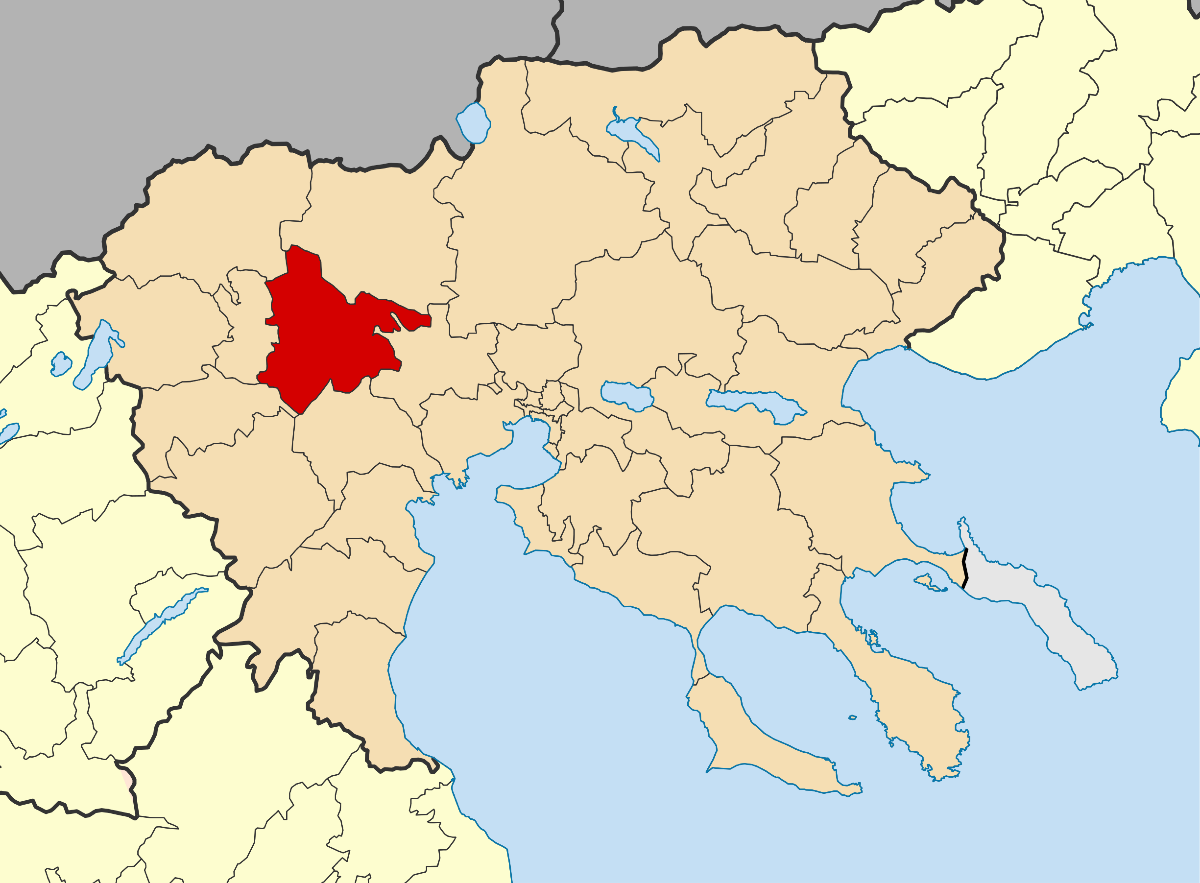

- Location within Greece
- Coordinates: 40°47′N 22°24′E
- Country: Greece
- Administrative region: Central Macedonia
- Regional unit: Pella
- Seat: Giannitsa

Government
  - Mayor: Efstathios Fountoukidis (since 2023)

Area
  - Municipality: 669.2 km^{2} (258.4 sq mi)
  - Municipal unit: 113.8 km^{2} (43.9 sq mi)
- Elevation: 36 m (118 ft)

Population (2021)
  - Municipality: 57,039
  - Density: 85.23/km^{2} (220.8/sq mi)
  - Municipal unit: 5,661
  - Municipal unit density: 49.75/km^{2} (128.8/sq mi)
  - Community: 2,050
- Time zone: UTC+2 (EET)
  - Summer (DST): UTC+3 (EEST)
- Postal code: 580 05
- Area code: 23820
- Vehicle registration: ΕΕ
- Website: www.giannitsa.gr

Pella (Greek: Πέλλα) is a municipality in the Pella regional unit of Central Macedonia, Greece. The capital of the municipality is Giannitsa, the largest town of the regional unit. On the site of the ancient city of Pella is the Archaeological Museum of Pella.

== Municipality ==
The municipality Pella was formed at the 2011 local government reform by the merger of the following 5 former municipalities, that became municipal units:

- Giannitsa
- Krya Vrysi
- Kyrros
- Megas Alexandros
- Pella (town)

The municipality has an area of 669.220 km^{2}, the municipal unit 113.819 km^{2}. The municipality has a population of 57,093 (2021 census). The capital of the municipality of Pella is Giannitsa (population 30,498 at the 2021 census). Other towns are Krya Vrysi (pop. 4,374), Mylotopos (pop. 1,831), Pella (town) (pop. 2,050), Galatades (pop. 1,628), Karyotissa (pop. 1,605), Aravissos (pop. 1,170) and Ampeleíai (pop. 1,003).

== Famous people ==
- Alexander the Great (356–323BC) King of Macedon at its height
- Philip II of Macedon Father of Alexander the great and king of Macedon from 359 BC until his assassination in 336 BC.
- Krste Misirkov (1874–1926), a philologist and publicist.

== See also ==
- Archaeological Museum of Pella
