= Macedonian front =

World War I military theatre

- Part of the Balkans theatre of World War I
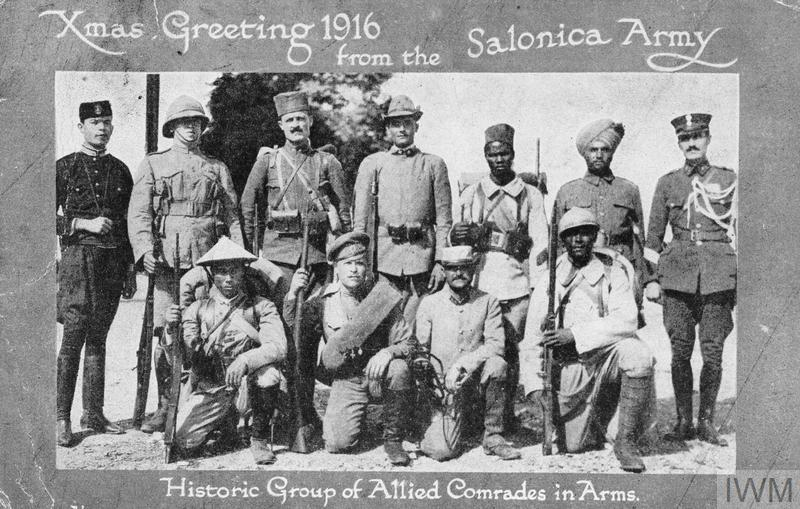
- From left to right standing: Montenegrin, British, Serbian, Italian, French Colonial Zouave, British Colonial Indian, Greek. Kneeling: French Colonial Vietnamese, Russian, French, French Colonial
Date	21 October 1915 – 30 September 1918 (2 years, 11 months, 1 week and 2 days)
Location	Macedonia
Result	Allied victory; Armistice of Salonica; End of the Balkans theatre

Belligerents
Central Powers: Bulgaria; Germany; Austria-Hungary; Ottoman Empire (1916–1917)	Allied Powers: France; Serbia; British Empire; Greece (from 1917); Italy; Russia (1916–1917); Honorary Russian Legion (from 1917)

Commanders and leaders
(Tsardom of Bulgaria (1908–1946)) Nikola Zhekov; (Tsardom of Bulgaria (1908–1946)) Georgi Todorov; (Tsardom of Bulgaria (1908–1946)) Kliment Boyadzhiev; (Tsardom of Bulgaria (1908–1946)) Dimitar Geshov; (Tsardom of Bulgaria (1908–1946)) Stefan Nerezov; Todor Aleksandrov; Aleksandar Protogerov; (German Empire) August von Mackensen; (German Empire) Otto von Below; (German Empire) Friedrich von Scholtz; (Austria-Hungary) Karl von Pflanzer-Baltin; (Ottoman Empire) Abdul Kerim Pasha	(French Third Republic) Maurice Sarrail; (French Third Republic) Adolphe Guillaumat; (French Third Republic) Louis F. d'Esperey; (Kingdom of Serbia) Petar Bojović; (Kingdom of Serbia) Živojin Mišić; (United Kingdom of Great Britain and Ireland) Bryan Mahon; (United Kingdom of Great Britain and Ireland) George Milne; (Kingdom of Greece) Panagiotis Danglis

Units involved
Army Group Scholtz: 11th German Army (Note: The German 11th Army was composed of mostly Bulgarian divisions.); 1st Bulgarian Army; 2nd Bulgarian Army; 4th Bulgarian Army; 11th Macedonian Infantry Division; Ottoman XX Corps; Army Group Albania	Allied Army of the Orient: Armée d'Orient; 1st Serbian Army (Note: The Serbian armies were corps sized formations.); 2nd Serbian Army; 3rd Serbian Army; British Salonika Army; National Defence Army; 35th Italian division; Russian Expeditionary Force; Italian XVI Corps

Strength
(Tsardom of Bulgaria (1908–1946)) 550,000 men; (German Empire) 18,000 men; 1,217 artillery pieces; 2,710 machine guns; 30 aeroplanes; (Austria-Hungary) Unknown; (Ottoman Empire) 29,000 men (Dec 1916 – May 1917), afterwards 4,300 (until May 1918).	717,000 men; 2,609 artillery pieces; 2,682 machine guns; 6,434 automatic rifles; 200 aeroplanes

Casualties and losses
(Tsardom of Bulgaria (1908–1946)) 200,000 casualties (Note: Losses for Bulgaria in the whole war are given as 266,919 (including killed and died 87,500; wounded 152,930; Prisoners and missing 27,029). Bar 30,250 casualties in the Romanian Campaign and 37,000 casualties in the Serbian Campaign losses were all taken on the Salonika front.) (Austria-Hungary) (German Empire) (Ottoman Empire) Unknown	(French Third Republic) 6,700 killed, 15,600 missing and 16,200 wounded; (Kingdom of Serbia) 40,000 casualties (Note: Total Serbian military casualties in World War I numbered approximately 481,000, including 278,000 dead from all causes (including POWs), 133,000 wounded, and 70,000 living POWs. Of these 481,000, some 434,000 were suffered in the earlier Serbian campaign. Most of the rest were taken on the Macedonian front following the evacuation of the Serbian army.); (Kingdom of Greece) 27,000 casualties (Note: Total casualties for Greece were 27,000 (killed and died 5,000; wounded 21,000; prisoners and missing 1,000)); (United Kingdom of Great Britain and Ireland) 26,207 casualties (Note: Breakdown: 2,797 were killed, 1,299 died of wounds, 3,744 died of disease, 2,778 were missing/captured, 16,888 were wounded (minus DOW), 116,190 evacuated sick (34,726 to the UK, 81,428 elsewhere) of whom an unknown proportion returned to duty later. Overall, 481,262 were hospitalized for sickness.); (Kingdom of Italy) 10,538 casualties (Note: Losses are given as follows for 1916 to 1918. Macedonia: 8,324, including 2,971 dead or missing and 5,353 injured. Albania: 2,214, including 298 dead, 1,069 wounded, and 847 missing.); (Russian Empire) Unknown

The Macedonian front, also known as the Salonica front (after Thessaloniki), was a military theatre of World War I formed as a result of an attempt by the Allied Powers to aid Serbia, in the autumn of 1915, against the combined attack of Germany, Austria-Hungary and Bulgaria. The expedition came too late and with insufficient force to prevent the fall of Serbia and was complicated by the internal political crisis in Greece (the National Schism). Eventually, a stable front was established, running from the Albanian Adriatic coast to the Struma River, pitting a multinational Allied force against the Bulgarian army, which was at various times bolstered with smaller units from the other Central Powers. The Macedonian front remained stable, despite local actions, until the Allied offensive in September 1918 resulted in Bulgaria capitulating and the liberation of Serbia.

== Background ==
Following the assassination of Archduke Franz Ferdinand by a Bosnian Serb, Austria-Hungary had attacked Serbia in August 1914 but had failed to overcome Serbian resistance. After the entry of the Ottoman Empire into the war on the side of the Central Powers (November 1914), the decisive factor in the Balkans became the attitude of Bulgaria. Bulgaria occupied a strategically important position on the Serbian flank, and its intervention on either side of the belligerents would be decisive. Bulgaria and Serbia had fought each other twice in the previous thirty years: in the Serbo-Bulgarian War of 1885 and the Second Balkan War of 1913. Bulgaria had suffered defeat in 1913, and the Bulgarian government and people generally felt that Serbia had seized land which rightfully belonged to Bulgaria. While the Allies could only offer Bulgaria small territorial concessions from Serbia and neutral Greece, the Central Powers' promises appeared far more enticing, offering to cede most of the land Bulgaria claimed. With the Allied defeats at the Battle of Gallipoli (April 1915 to January 1916) and the Russian defeat at Gorlice-Tarnów (May to September 1915) demonstrating the Central Powers' strength, King Ferdinand signed a treaty with Germany and on 21 September 1915 Bulgaria began mobilizing for war.

=== Triple invasion and the fall of Serbia ===
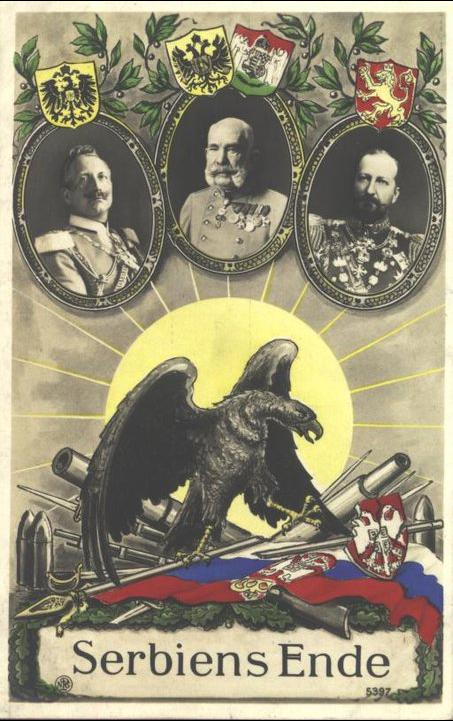
A propaganda postcard commemorating the victory of the Central Powers over Serbia in 1915. The three monarchs depicted from left to right are Emperor Wilhelm II of Germany, Emperor Franz Josef of Austria, and King Ferdinand of Bulgaria. The caption in German reads "Serbia's End".

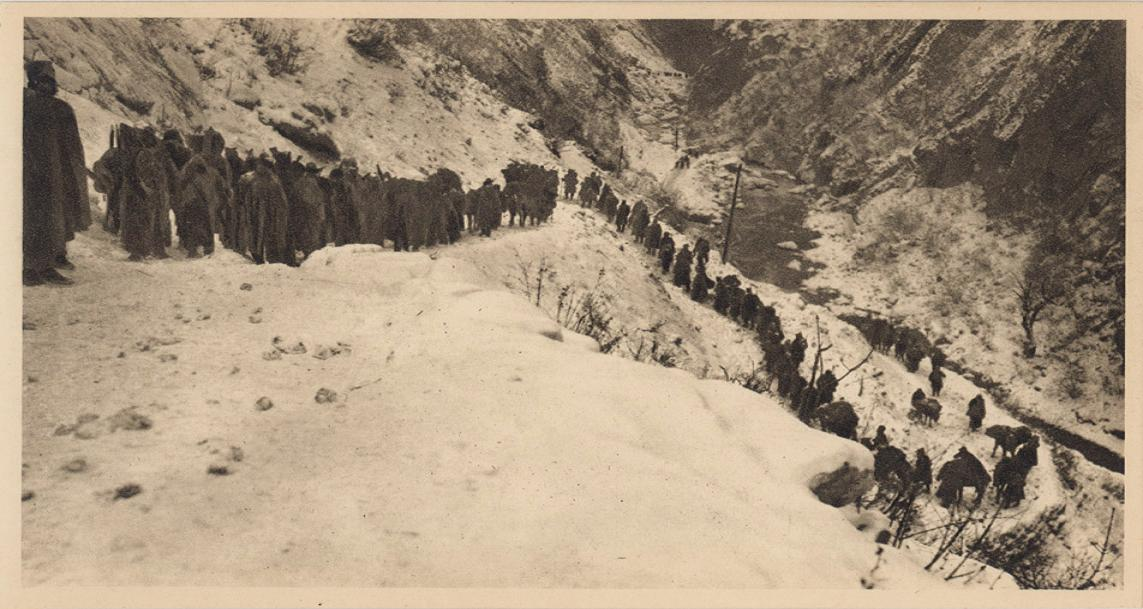
The retreat of the Serbian troops in winter 1915/16 across a snowy mountain in Albania to the Adriatic coast.

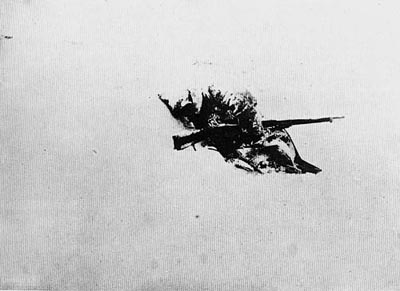
A dead Serbian soldier in the snow.

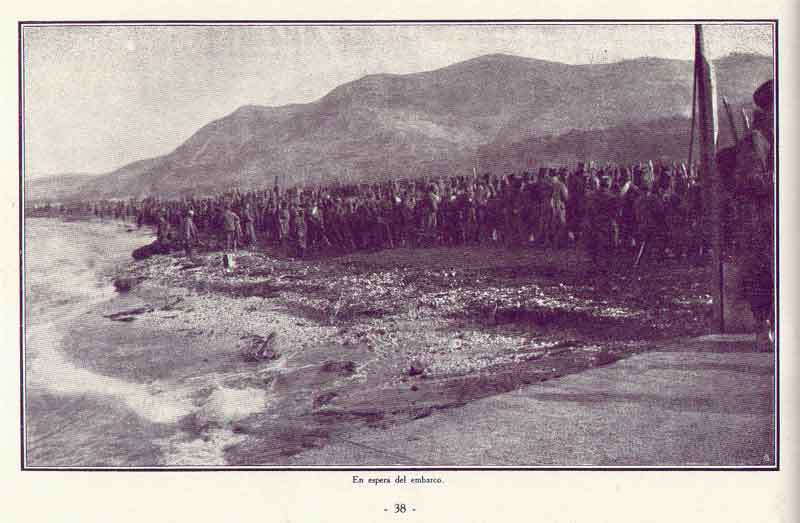
Exhausted Serbian soldiers on the seashore in the expectation of Allied ships, February 1916.

After the victory of the Royal Serbian Army in the Battle of Kolubara in December 1914, the Serbian front saw a lull until the early autumn of 1915. Under the command of Field Marshal August von Mackensen, the Austro-Hungarian Balkan Army, the German 11th Army and river flotillas on the Danube and the Sava began an offensive on 6 October 1915, the largest offensive against Serbia. By September 1915, despite the extreme sacrifice of the Serbian army, the Austro-Hungarian Balkan Army, having crossed the rivers Sava and Drina, and the German 11th Army after crossing the Danube, occupied Belgrade, Smederevo, Požarevac and Golubac, creating a vast bridgehead south of the Sava and Danube rivers, and forcing Serbian forces to withdraw to southern Serbia.

On 15 October 1915, two Bulgarian armies attacked, over-running Serbian units and penetrating the valley of the South Morava river near Vranje up to 22 October 1915. The Bulgarian forces occupied Kumanovo, Štip, and Skopje and prevented the withdrawal of the Serbian army to the Greek border and Thessaloniki (Salonika).

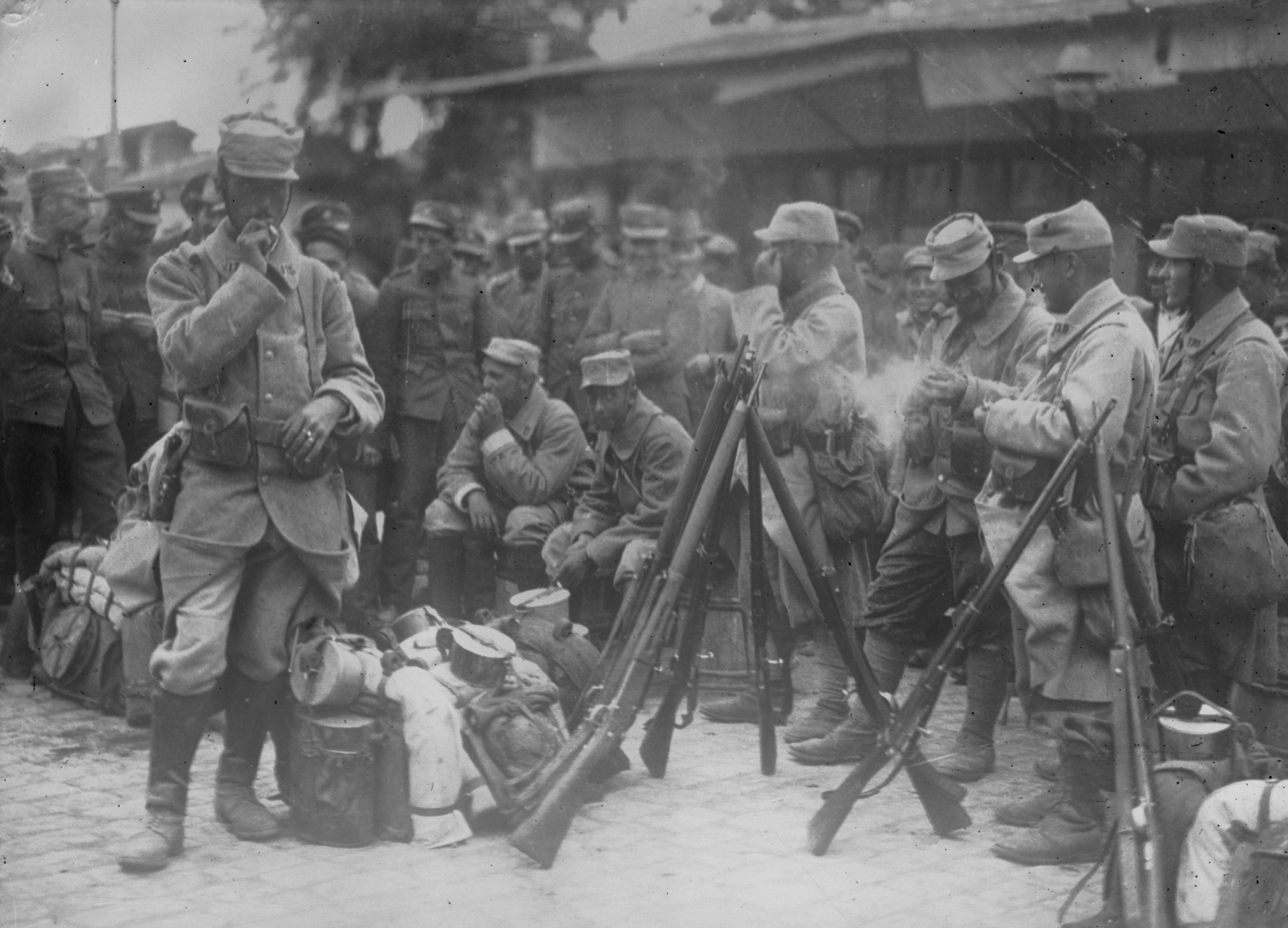
French soldiers halting in Thessaloniki (1915).

The Allies (Britain and France) had repeatedly promised to send military forces to Serbia, but nothing had materialized for a year. However, with Bulgaria's mobilization to its south, the situation for Serbia became desperate. The developments finally forced the French and the British to decide upon sending a small expedition force of two divisions from Gallipoli (156th Infantry Division (France) and 10th (Irish) Division respectively). Though the first troops landed in the port of Salonika on 5 October to combine into an Army of the Orient under the French commander Maurice Sarrail, they arrived in the Greek port of Thessaloniki too late to contribute to the operations to help Serbia. The main reason for the delay was the lack of available Allied forces due to the critical situation in the Western Front. The Allies used Greek neutrality as an excuse, although they could have used the Albanian coast to rapidly deploy reinforcements and equipment during the first 14 months of the war. (As the Serbian Marshal Radomir Putnik had suggested, the Royal Montenegrin Army gave adequate cover to the Albanian coast from the north—at a safe distance from any Bulgarian advance in the south in the event of a Bulgarian intervention.) The Allies were also delayed due to protracted though ultimately fruitless secret negotiations to bring Bulgaria into the Allied camp, which would have alleviated Serbia's need for Franco-British help.

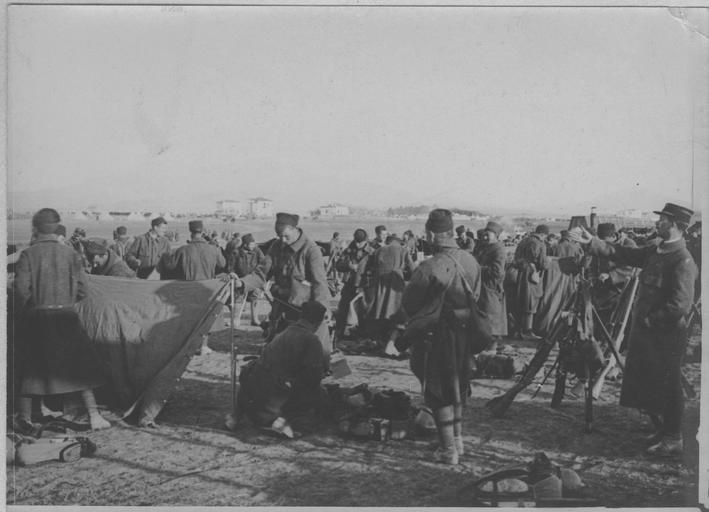
Wearing new khaki uniforms, the 2nd Zouaves arrive at Salonika aerodrome following disembarkation.

In the event, the lack of Allied support sealed the fate of the Serbian army. Against Serbia, the Central Powers marshalled the Bulgarian Army, a German army, and an Austro-Hungarian army, all under the command of Field Marshal August von Mackensen. The Germans and Austro-Hungarians began their attack on 7 October with a massive artillery barrage, followed by attacks across the rivers. Then, on 11 October, the Bulgarian army attacked from two directions, one from the north of Bulgaria towards Niš, the other from the south towards Skopje (see map). The Bulgarian army rapidly broke through the weaker Serbian forces that tried to block its advance. With the Bulgarian breakthrough, the Serbian position became hopeless; their main army in the north faced either encirclement and forced surrender or retreat.

Marshal Putnik ordered a full Serbian retreat, southwards and westwards through Montenegro and into Albania. The Serbs faced great difficulties: terrible weather, poor roads and the need for the army to help the tens of thousands of civilians who retreated with them. Only c. 125,000 Serbian soldiers reached the Adriatic coast and embarked on Italian transport ships that carried the army to Corfu and other Greek islands before it travelled on to Thessaloniki. Marshal Putnik had to be carried around during the entire retreat; he died just over a year later in a French hospital.

The French and British divisions marched north from Thessaloniki in October 1915 under the joint command of French General Maurice Sarrail and British General Bryan Mahon (Commander, British Salonika Force, 1915). However, the London War Office was reluctant to advance too deep into Serbia. So the French divisions advanced up the Vardar river alone. This advance gave some limited help to the retreating Serbian army, as the Bulgarians had to concentrate larger forces on their southern flank to deal with the threat, which led to the Battle of Krivolak (October–November 1915). By the end of November, General Sarrail had to retreat in the face of massive Bulgarian assaults on his positions. During his retreat, the British at Kosturino were also forced to retreat. By 12 December, all Allied forces were back in Greece. The Germans ordered the Bulgarians not to cross the Greek borders, reluctant to risk a Greek entry into the war in response to a Bulgarian invasion in Macedonia. The Allies took advantage of that, reinforcing and consolidating their positions behind the borders.

Thus the Central Powers achieved a clear, albeit incomplete, victory. They opened the railway line from Berlin to Constantinople, allowing Germany to prop up its weaker partner, the Ottoman Empire. Despite their defeat, the Allies managed to save a part of the Royal Serbian Army, which although battered, seriously reduced, and almost unarmed, escaped destruction and reorganized, resuming operations six months later. And most damagingly for the Central Powers, the Allies—using the moral excuse of saving the Serbian army—managed to replace the impossible Serbian front with a viable one established in Macedonia (albeit by violating the territory of an officially neutral country); this front would prove key to their final victory three years later.

== Establishment of the Macedonian front ==
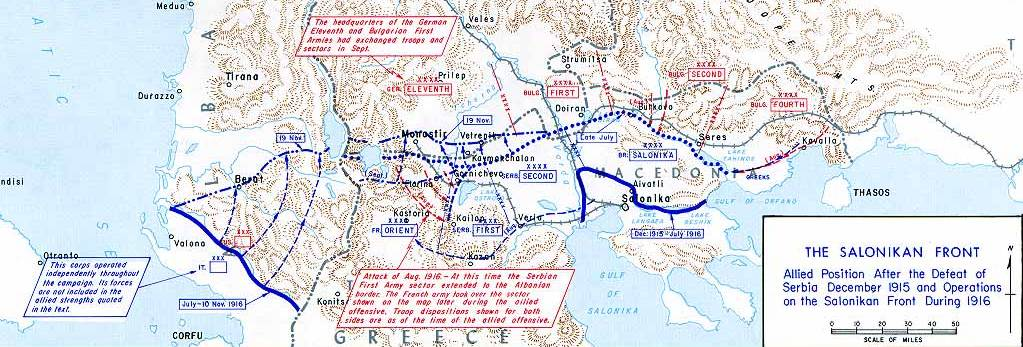
Fighting along the Greek border, 1916.

On 5 January 1916, the Austro-Hungarian Army attacked Serbian ally Montenegro. The small Montenegrin army offered strong resistance in the Battle of Mojkovac, which greatly helped the withdrawal of the Serbian army, but soon faced impossible odds and was compelled to surrender on 25 January. The Austro-Hungarians advanced down the coast of the Adriatic Sea into Italian-controlled Albania. By the end of the winter, the small Italian army in Albania had been forced out of nearly the whole country. With the war in the Balkans almost lost, the British General Staff wanted to withdraw all British troops from Greece, but the French government protested strongly, and the troops remained. The Allied armies entrenched around Thessaloniki, which became a huge fortified camp, earning themselves the mocking nickname "the Gardeners of Salonika". The Serbian army (now under the command of General Petar Bojović), after rest and refit on Corfu, was transported by the French to the Macedonian front.

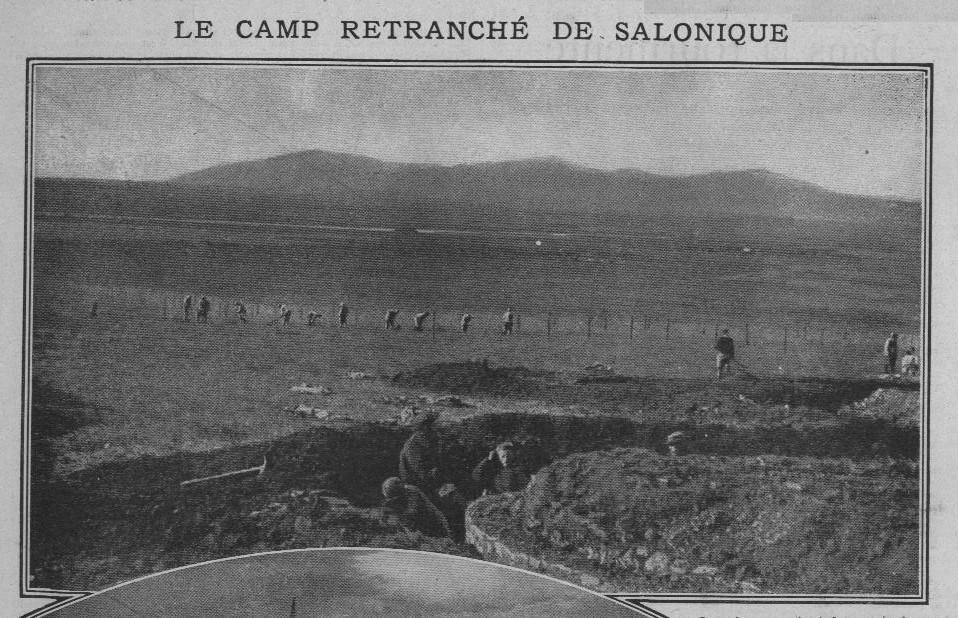
The lines of earthworks around Salonika, French troops dig trenches to defend the city.

In the meantime, the political situation in Greece was confusing. Officially, Greece was neutral, but King Constantine I was pro-German, while Prime Minister Eleftherios Venizelos was pro-Allied. Venizelos invited the Allies into Thessaloniki. With the knowledge that Romania was about to join the Allied side, General Sarrail began preparations for an attack on the Bulgarian armies facing his forces. The Germans made plans of their own for a "spoiling attack". The German offensive was launched on 17 August, just three days before the French offensive was scheduled to start. This was a Bulgarian offensive, as the Austro-Hungarian army was in Albania, and only one German division was on the Greek border. The Bulgarians attacked on two fronts. In the east, they easily conquered all Greek territory east of the river Struma (see Struma operation) since the Greek army was ordered not to resist by the pro-German King Constantine. The attack achieved early success in the west thanks to surprise, but the Allied forces held a defensive line after two weeks. Having halted the Bulgarian offensive, the Allies staged a counter-attack starting on 12 September (Battle of Kaymakchalan). The terrain was rough, and the Bulgarians were on the defensive, but the Allied forces made steady gains. Slow advances by the Allies continued throughout October and into November, even as the weather turned cold and snow fell on the hills. Though the Germans sent two more divisions to help bolster the Bulgarian army, by 19 November, the French and Serbian armies captured Kaymakchalan, the highest peak of Nidže mountain and compelled the Central powers to abandon Bitola to the Allies; c. 60,000 Bulgarians and Germans were killed, wounded or captured. The Allies suffered c. 50,000 battle casualties while another 80,000 men died or were evacuated due to sickness. The front moved about 25 miles (40 km).

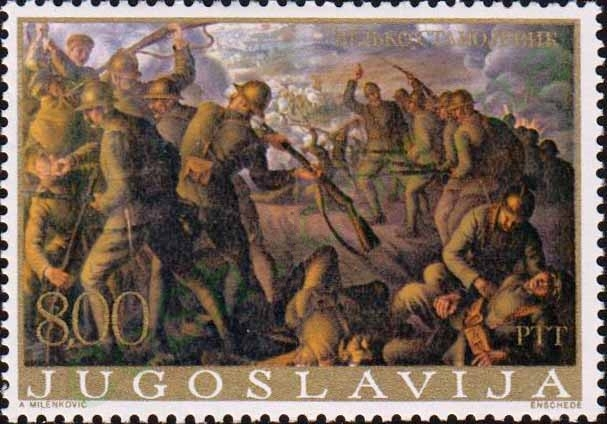
A 1976 Yugoslav postage stamp depicting the collapse of the Salonika front by war artist Veljko Stanojević

The unopposed Bulgarian advance into Greek-held eastern Macedonia precipitated a crisis in Greece. Though the royalist government ordered its troops in the area (the demobilized IV Corps) not to resist and to retreat to the port of Kavala for evacuation, naval vessels did not turn up to permit the evacuation to take place. Despite occasional local resistance from a few officers and their nucleus units, most of the troops, including their commander, surrendered to a token German force and were interned for the remainder of the war at Görlitz, Germany. The surrender of territory recently won with difficulty in the Second Balkan War of 1913 was the last straw for many Venizelist army officers. With Allied assistance, they launched a coup which secured Thessaloniki and most of Greek Macedonia for Venizelos. From that point, Greece had two governments: the "official" royal government at Athens, which maintained Greek neutrality, and the "revolutionary" Venizelist "Provisional Government of National Defence" at Thessaloniki, this division became known as National Schism. At the same time, the Italians had deployed more forces to Albania, which managed to push the Austrian corps back through very hilly country south of Lake Ostrovo.

The Allies treated Salonika very much like a colony. Thessaloniki was more ethnically and religiously mixed than today, and was viewed by the British and French soldiers as an exotic "Oriental" city with its winding, cramped streets, domes, churches, synagogues, mosques, and the very striking White Tower that overlooked the city. Thessaloniki had been part of the Ottoman Empire until 1912 when it was won by Greece in the First Balkan War, and in 1915 the city still had a very Ottoman feel to it. Etienne Burnet, a French bacteriologist sent out from Paris to take part in an anti-malaria campaign marveled: "What a multi-colored crowd on the quayside! Caftans, turbans, western suits in the latest style, black robes and scarlet fezzes like poppies" and Thessaloniki was "both wretched and splendid, just like the Orient". Burnet's reaction to Thessaloniki was very typical of the Anglo-French responses to Thessaloniki, a city that did not match expectations of classical Greece and seemed to them to be more Ottoman than Greek. The treatment of the local women by their menfolk created much disgust as the women were always cloistered away or treated as "beasts of burden". Many of the French soldiers were peasants who were much incensed by the backward state of agriculture in the farms outside of Thessaloniki, which led many French soldiers to complain about the primitive farming methods of Macedonia. The French in particular saw themselves as engaged in the mission civilisatrice ("civilizing mission"), which led for the French Army to embark upon a series of public works projects such as building bridges, improving roads, providing piped water to rural villages, trying to eradicate malaria, and so forth. Such projects were intended primarily to benefit the French Army, but many French officers genuinely believed that helping the local people "come to love France", as one French colonel put it, was an idealistic goal in and of itself was worth pursuing. Of the 8 French Army divisions stationed on the Salonika front, three were colonial divisions while the 156th French Division had a significant number of colonial units attached to it. Of the 221,000 French troops who served in Macedonia, at least 47,000 (21%) were colonial units, mostly the tirailleurs sénégalais from West Africa, a number of units from Algeria, and the Tirailleurs indochinois from French Indochina. Algeria was considered part of France at the time and a significant minority in Algeria were pieds-noirs as the European settlers were called, and the French did not necessarily consider Algerian units to be colonial units; it is possible that at least third of the French Armée d' Orient were colonial units. The presence of so many colonial units from Algeria, French West Africa, Madagascar and Indochina led to a "reverse exoticism" for the Greek Macedonia as Vietnamese soldiers serving in the tirailleurs indochinois celebrated their traditional Vietnamese holidays, which provided unusual spectacles in the Balkans.

The troops of the 10th (Irish) Division of the British Army had a very "live and let live" attitude towards their Bulgarian enemies, and refrained from trench raids, only shelled each other's trenches at specific times to avoid inconvenience to the other side and often avoided shooting at the enemy. The mostly Irish troops in their letters to their families back home often described Bulgarians as "Brother Bulgar", and reserved all their hatred for the Germans and the British General Staff, which they accused of neglecting them.

== 1917 ==
By spring 1917, General Sarrail's Allied Army of the Orient had been reinforced to 24 divisions, six French, six Serbian, seven British, one Italian, three Greek and two Russian brigades. An offensive was planned for late April, but the initial attack failed with significant losses, and the offensive was called off on 21 May. To put more pressure on Athens, the Venizelists and the Allies occupied Thessaly and Isthmus of Corinth, dividing the country. After an attempt to occupy Athens by force, which caused the reaction of the local royalist forces and ended in a fiasco in December (see Noemvriana), the Allies established a naval blockade around southern Greece, which was still loyal to King Constantine, causing extreme hardship to the people in those areas. Six months later, in June, the Venizelists presented a list of conditions, resulting in the exile of the Greek king (on 14 June, his son Alexander became king) and the reunification of the country under Venizelos. The new government immediately declared war on the Central Powers and created a new army.

== 1918 ==
=== Opposing forces in the middle of September ===
==== Central Powers ====
Order of battle: Army Group Scholtz (General of the Artillery Friedrich von Scholtz)
Army	Commander	Corps	Commander	Divisions
11th German Army	Gen.d.Inf. Kuno von Steuben	LXI. Corps	Lt-Gen. Friedrich Fleck	1st, 6th & Mixed Bulgarian Division
		LXII. Corps	Lt-Gen. Karl Suren	302nd German Division, 4th, 2nd & 3rd Bulgarian Division
1st Bulgarian Army	Lt-Gen. Stefan Nerezov			5th, Mountain, 9th Bulgarian Infantry Divisions & 1/11 Infantry Brigade

Order of battle: Bulgarian High Command (Lieutenant General Georgi Todorov)
Army	Commander	Corps	Commander	Divisions
2nd Bulgarian Army	Lt-Gen Ivan Lukov			11th, 7th & 8th Bulgarian Infantry Division
4th Bulgarian Army	Lt-Gen Stefan Toshev			10th Bulgarian Infantry division & 2nd Bulgarian Cavalry Division

==== Allies ====
Order of battle: Allied Armies of the East (General Louis Franchet d'Espèrey)
Army	Commander	Corps	Commander	Division
French Army of the Orient	General Paul Henrys			30th, 76th, 57th, 156th French Infantry Divisions, 35th Italian Infantry Division, 11th French Colonial Division, 3rd & 4th Greek Infantry Divisions
Serbian Army	Field Marshal Živojin Mišić	I Serbian Corps & One battalion	Field Marshal Petar Bojović	Morava, Dunav & Drina Infantry Divisions, Cavalry Division, Prilep Battalion
Serbian Army	Field Marshal Živojin Mišić	II Serbian Corps & Two French Divisions	Field Marshal Stepa Stepanović	Šumadija, Yugoslav (renamed Vardar Division) & Timok Infantry Divisions, 122nd & 17th French Infantry Division
1st Group of Divisions	General Philippe d'Anselm			16th French Colonial Division, Greek Archipelago Division & 27th British Infantry Division
British Salonika Army	General George Milne	XII Corps	Lt-Gen. Henry Wilson	22nd & 26th British Infantry Division, Greek Serres Division
British Salonika Army	General George Milne	XVI Corps	Lt-Gen. Charles James Briggs	28th British Infantry Division & Greek Crete Division
Greek Army	Lt.-Gen. Panagiotis Danglis	I Greek Corps	Lt.-Gen. Leonidas Paraskevopoulos	1st, 2nd & 13th Greek Infantry Divisions
Greek Army	Lt.-Gen. Panagiotis Danglis	II Greek Corps	Lt.-Gen. Konstantinos Miliotis-Komninos	Xanthi & 14th Greek Infantry Divisions
Greek Army	Lt.-Gen. Panagiotis Danglis			9th Greek Infantry Division (training)

=== Military operations ===
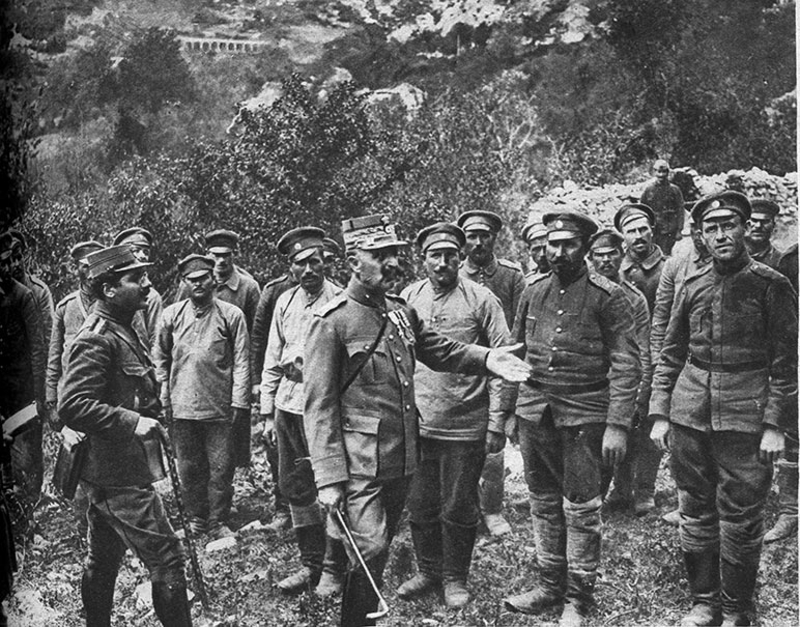
Colonel Nikolaos Christodoulou, one of the leaders of the Greek National Defence Army, interrogates Bulgarian prisoners of war.

On 30 May 1918, the Allies launched an offensive on the heavily fortified Skra salient, commencing the battle of Skra-di-Legen. The battle marked the first significant Greek action for the Allied side. Utilizing the cover of heavy artillery, a Franco-Hellenic force made a rapid push into the enemy trenches, conquering Skra and the surrounding system of fortifications. Greek casualties amounted to 434–440 killed in action, 154–164 missing in action and 1,974–2,220 wounded, while France lost approximately 150 men killed or injured. A total of 1,782 soldiers of the Central Powers became prisoners of war, including a small number of German engineers and artillery specialists that served in Bulgarian units; considerable amounts of military equipment also fell into Allied hands. The plan for a Bulgarian counteroffensive against Skra remained unfulfilled as Bulgarian soldiers refused to participate in the operation. Both the Greek and the French press used the opportunity to laud the efforts of the Greek army, favourably influencing the Greek mobilization.

The fall of Skra prompted Bulgarian prime minister Vasil Radoslavov to resign on 21 June 1918. Aleksandar Malinov, who assumed office immediately afterwards, pursued secret negotiations with Britain, offering to withdraw Bulgaria from the war with the condition that Bulgaria fully retain eastern Macedonia. However, British prime minister David Lloyd George rejected the proposal, assuring the Greek ambassador in London Ioannis Gennadius that Britain would not act against Greek interests.

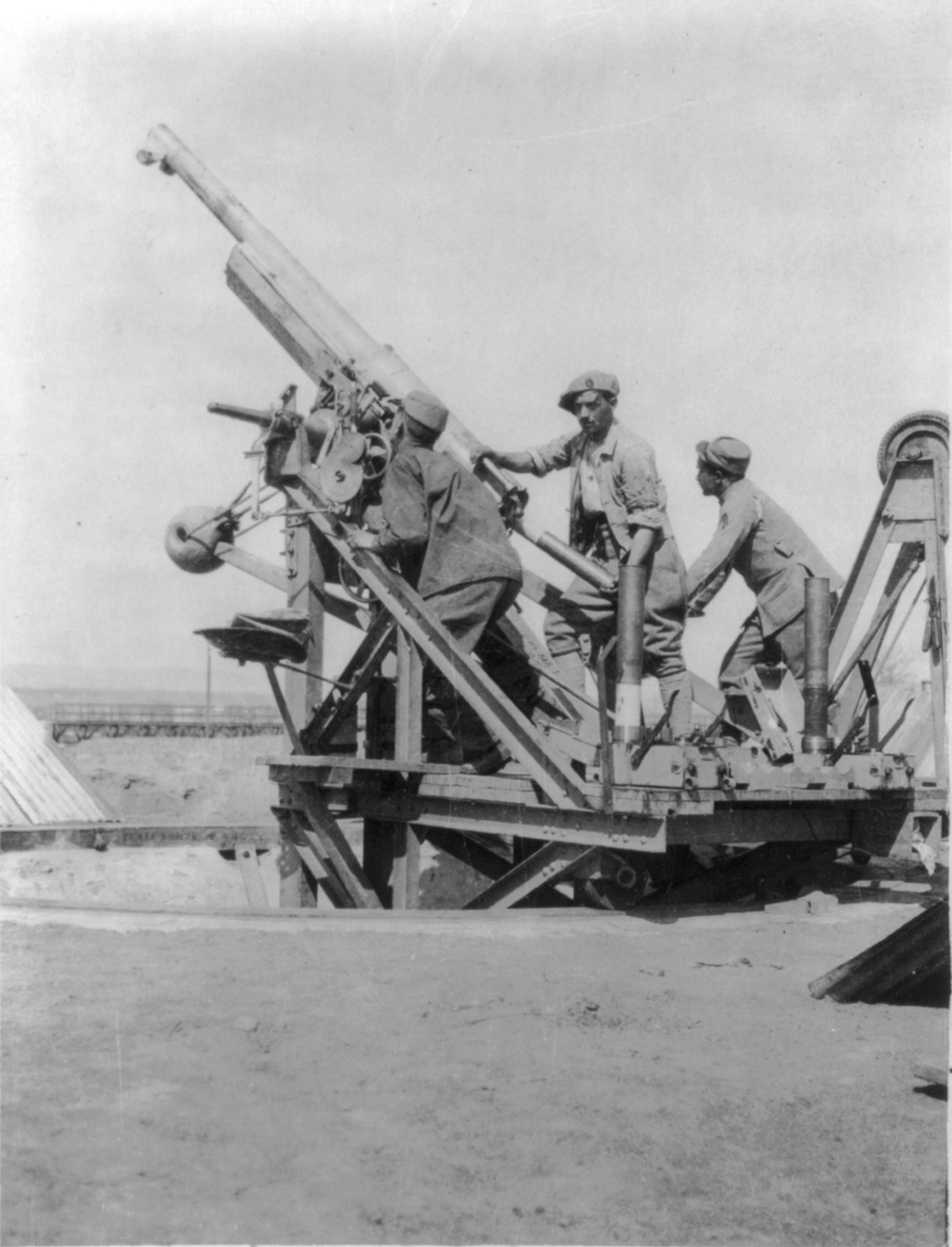
French gunners with 75 mm anti-aircraft gun in Thessaloniki.

With the German spring offensive threatening France, Guillaumat was recalled to Paris and replaced by General Franchet d'Espèrey. Although d'Espèrey urged an attack on the Bulgarian army, the French government refused to allow an offensive unless all the countries agreed. General Guillaumat, no longer needed in France, travelled from London to Rome, trying to win approval for an attack. Finally, in September 1918, an agreement was reached, allowing d'Espèrey to launch his grand offensive.

The Allied forces were now large, despite the Russian exit from the war due to the Treaty of Brest-Litovsk in March 1918. Greece and its army (nine divisions) were fully committed to the Entente, while 6,000 Czech and Slovak former prisoners of war held on the Italian front were re-armed, reorganized, and transferred to the Macedonian front to fight for the Allies. The Bulgarians had also increased their army during 1917, leading both sides to have roughly equal military power (291 Allied battalions vs. 300 Bulgarian battalions and ten German battalions). However, as 1918 progressed, it was clear that the Allies had the momentum the Central Powers lacked. Russian defeat had yielded no meaningful benefit to the Central Powers. The Ottoman Empire faced a progressive loss of Arab lands. In Austria-Hungary, non-German and non-Hungarian parts of the multinational empire grew more openly restive. On the Western Front, intense German spring offensives had not defeated France, and American deployment was increasingly effective, with US forces operating under independent command from June 1918. Though Bulgaria was not at war with the United States, German victory over the United States appeared conceptually infeasible. Finally, and most importantly for Bulgaria, although almost all of its territorial war aims were already achieved, because World War I was not merely a third Balkan War, Bulgaria could not quit. Alongside its partners, Bulgaria continued to suffer high casualties and civilian privation, including food shortages, seemingly to achieve the unrealized objectives of its allies. As a constitutional monarchy, Bulgaria depended on the consent of its people to keep fighting while stress and discontent with the war grew.

An unintentional result of the Treaty of Brest-Litovsk which ended the war with Russia and the Treaty of Bucharest which ended the war with Romania was to undermine morale in the Austrian Imperial and Royal Army. Besides for the peace treaties, Serbia had been defeated in 1915 and Italy had been almost defeated in 1917, meaning that most of the Austrian war aims had already achieved, and from the Austrian point of view, there was no more point in continuing the war. However, the Austro-Hungarian Empire was very much the junior partner in its alliance with Germany, and under strong German pressure Austria-Hungary had to continue the war, which caused serious morale problems in the Imperial and Royal Army by 1918. Within the Imperial and Royal Army, Germany was cursed as the "secret enemy" that had bullied the Austro-Hungarian Empire into continuing the war in order to achieve German war aims.

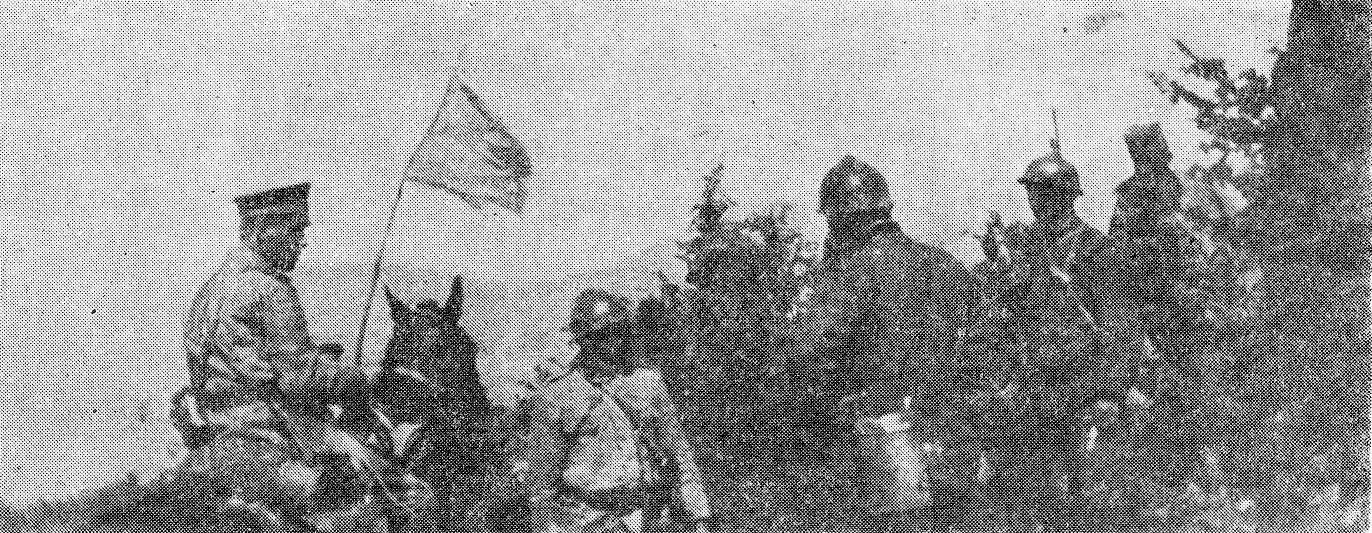
Bulgarian major Ivanov with white flag surrendering to Serbian 7th Danube regiment near Kumanovo

The preparatory artillery bombardment of Bulgarian and Central Powers positions for the Battle of Dobro Pole began on 14 September. The following day, the French and Serbians attacked and captured their objective. On 18 September, the Greeks and the British attacked but were stopped with heavy losses by the Bulgarians in the Battle of Doiran. The Franco-Serbian army continued advancing vigorously, and the next day, some Bulgarian units started surrendering positions without a fight, and the Bulgarian command ordered a retreat.

In the official British government history of the Macedonian campaign, Cyril Falls wrote a detailed analysis of the situation of the Bulgarian forces and the situation of the front. Although a breakthrough was achieved at Dobro Pole and the Allied forces continued their advance, the Bulgarian army was not routed and managed an orderly retreat. By 29 September (a day before Bulgaria exited World War I), Skopje fell, but a Bulgarian and German force had been ordered to try and retake it the next day; the number of Bulgarian prisoners-of-war in allied hands around that day was only 15,000.

Another major factor contributed to the Bulgarian request for an armistice. A mass of retreating Bulgarian mutineers had converged on the railway centre of Radomir in Bulgaria, 30 miles (48 km) from the capital city of Sofia. On 27 September, leaders of the Bulgarian Agrarian National Union took control of these troops and proclaimed the overthrow of the monarchy and a Bulgarian republic. About 4,000–5,000 rebellious troops threatened Sofia the next day. Under those chaotic circumstances, a Bulgarian delegation arrived in Thessaloniki to request an armistice. On 29 September, the Bulgarians were granted the Armistice of Salonica by General d'Espèrey, ending their war. The Macedonian front ended at noon on 30 September 1918 when the ceasefire came into effect. The Soldiers' Uprising was finally put down by 2 October.

German Emperor Wilhelm II, in his telegram to Bulgarian King Ferdinand I, stated: "Disgraceful! 62,000 Serbs decided the war!" On 29 September 1918, the German Supreme Army Command informed Wilhelm II and the Imperial Chancellor Count Georg von Hertling, that the military situation facing Germany was hopeless. Ferdinand I abdicated and went into exile on 3 October.

The British army headed east towards the European side of the Ottoman Empire as the French and Serbian forces continued north and liberated Serbia, Albania and Montenegro. The British army neared Constantinople, and with no Ottoman forces capable of stopping it, the Ottoman government asked for an armistice (the Armistice of Mudros) on 26 October; Enver Pasha and his partners had fled several days earlier to Berlin. The Serbo-French army recaptured Serbia and overran several weak German divisions that tried to block its advance near Niš. On 3 November, Austria-Hungary was forced to sign an armistice on the Italian front ending the war there. On 10 November, d'Espèrey's army crossed the Danube river and was poised to enter the heartland of Hungary. At the request of the French General, Count Mihály Károlyi, leading the Hungarian government, came to Belgrade and signed another armistice, the Armistice of Belgrade.

== Memorials ==
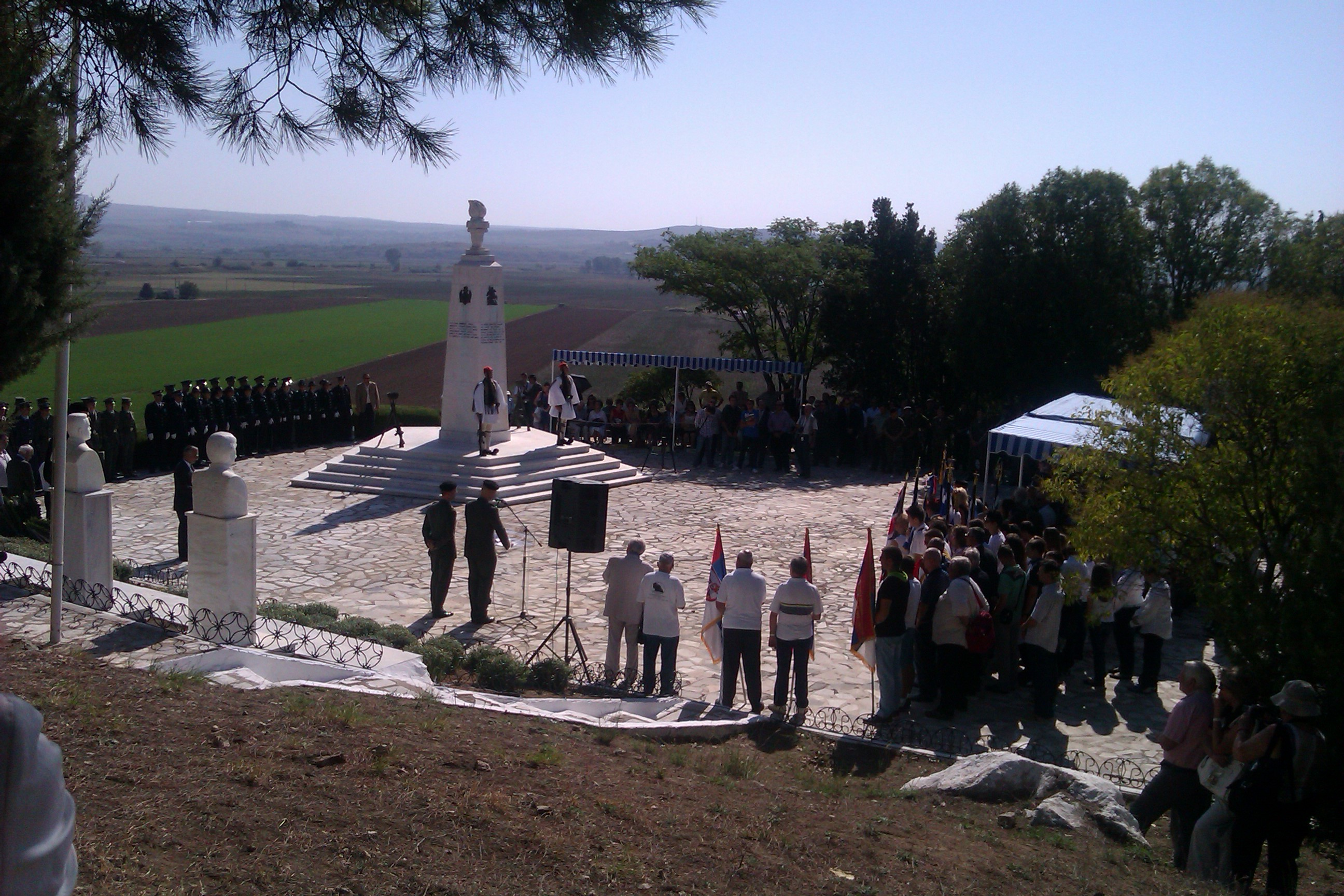
Inter-Alliance Memorial of the victory on the Macedonian Front on the 94th anniversary, in Latomi Kilkis, built on a site donated by Christos Th. Karathodoros

- Inter-Alliance Polykastro Memorial for the victory on the Macedonian Front, in Latomi Kilkis.
- Memorials erected in the area include the Doiran Memorial to the dead of the British Salonika army.

== Legacy ==
The entry of Greece in the war in 1917 is consided to have been crucial for Allied success in the Macedonian front. The Greek Army comprised one-third of the Allied forces in Macedonia, ensuring Allied numerical superiority. Their mobilization effort significantly fortified the Allied position and proved pivotal in attaining decisive victories during subsequent offensives, which ultimately led to the armistice with Bulgaria in September 1918.

As Louis Franchet d'Espèrey, the Allied commander-in-chief noted, the Allies "could not have undertaken the victorious operations of that September without the splendid fighting and numerical prowess of the Greek army". It is, as such, discerned that Allied military operations would likely have failed to achieve conclusive success without the presence of Greek units.

The victory in the Macedonian front is considered to have "struck the fatal blow at just the right moment thus opening the breach that caused the central Powers' coalition to collapse". Winston Churchill in his memoirs/history of the First World War, The World Crisis, assigned much importance to the defeat of Bulgaria in September 1918, which he saw as beginning a series of events that led to the defeat of Germany in November 1918, and which led him to place the operations in the Balkans as one of the decisive theaters of the war. The idea that the lands around the Mediterranean Sea were the weak point for the opposing side influenced Churchill's strategy in World War Two, where he consistently showed a preference for operations in the Mediterranean area as the supposed weak point in the Axis powers.

== Gallery ==
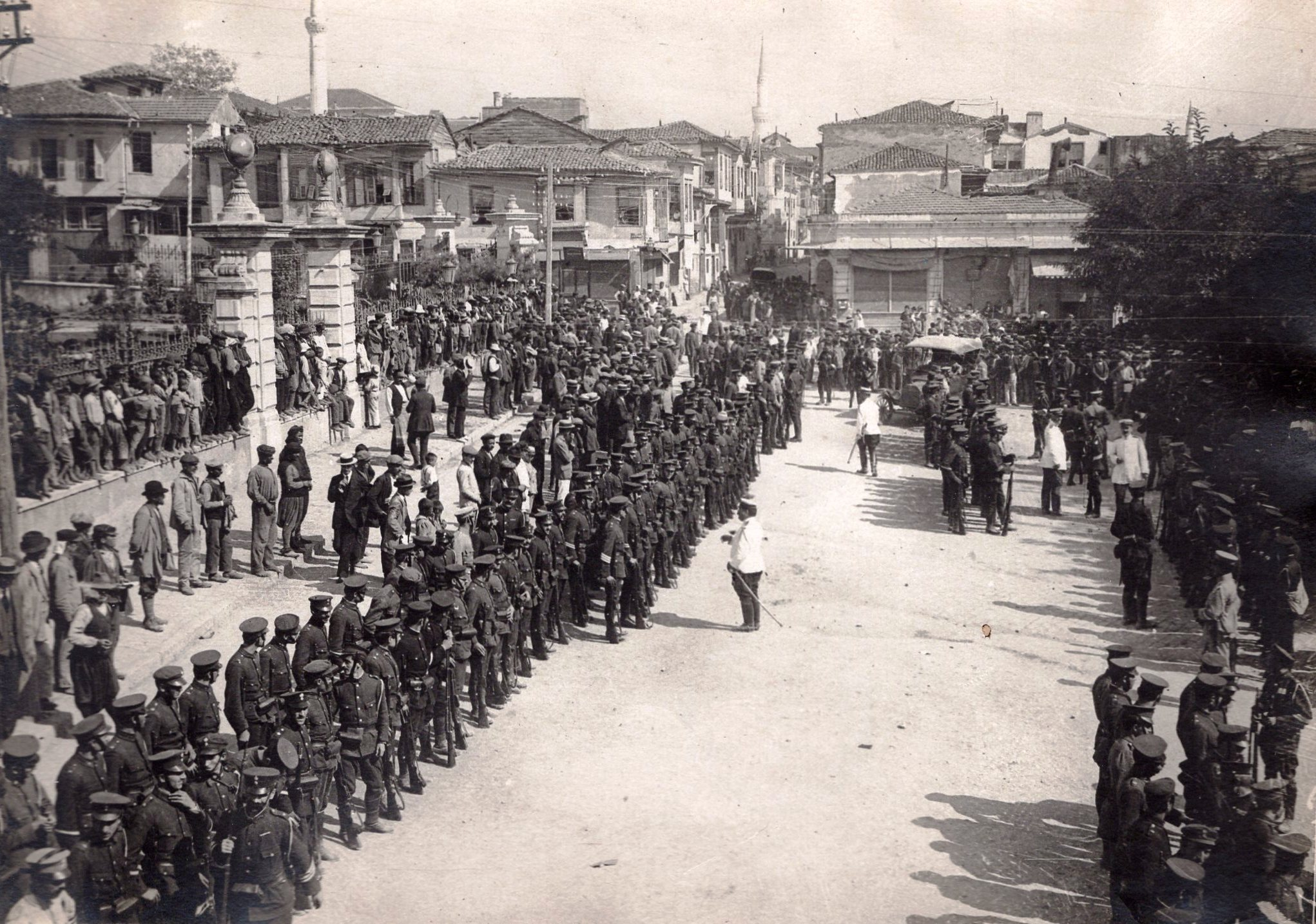
Armies in Thessaloniki, First World War

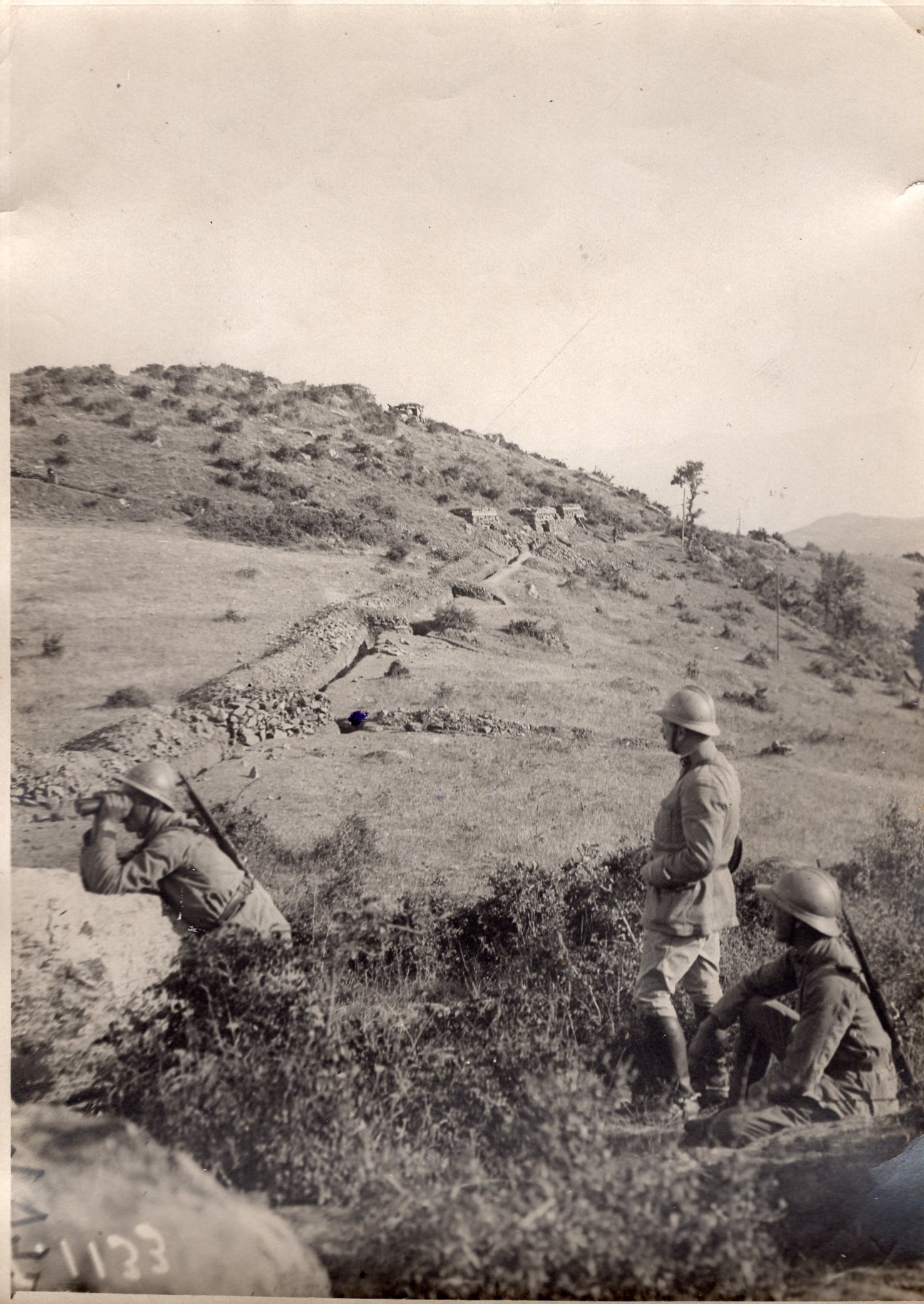
Macedonian front, front line

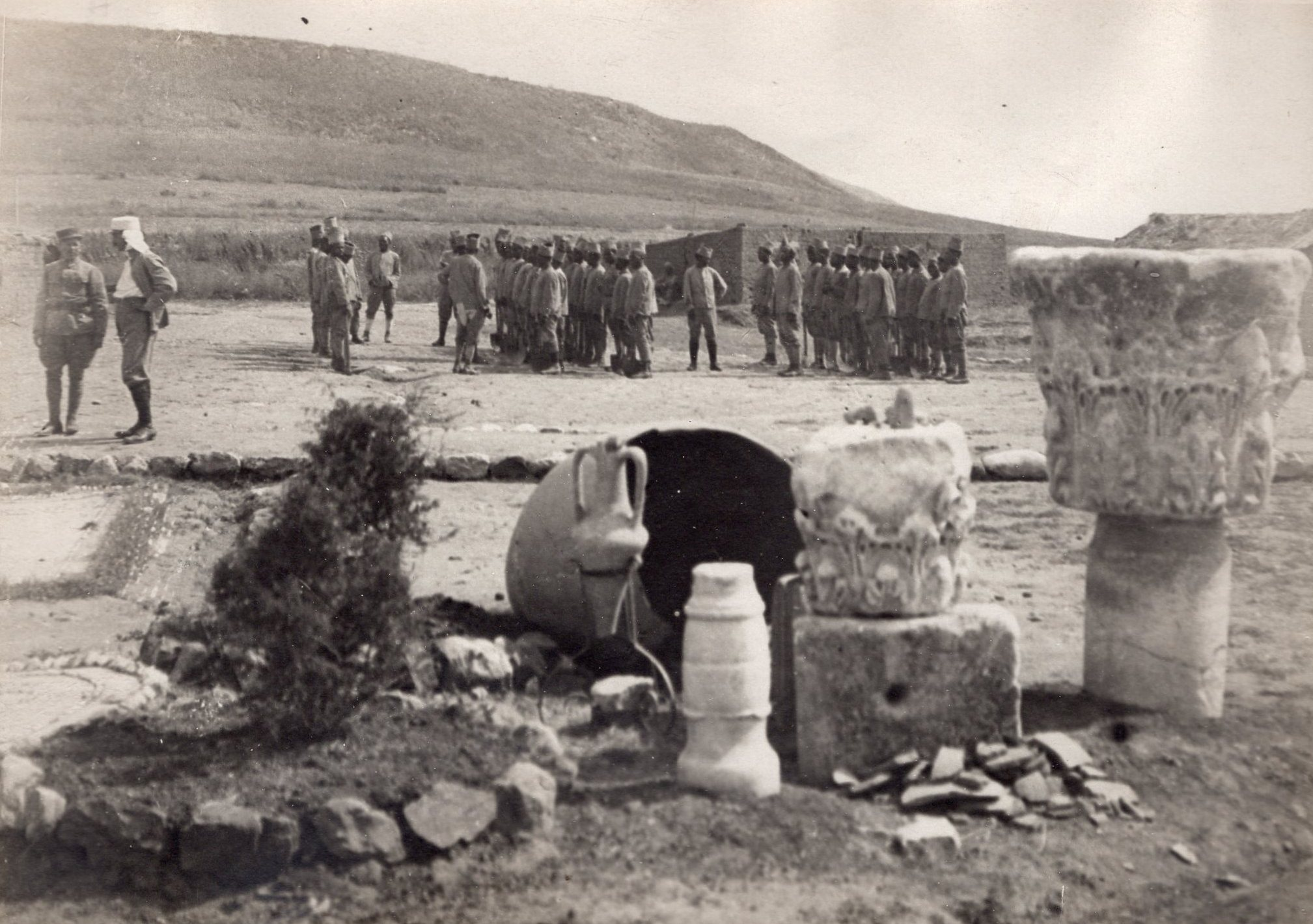
Military camp near Thessaloniki, First World War

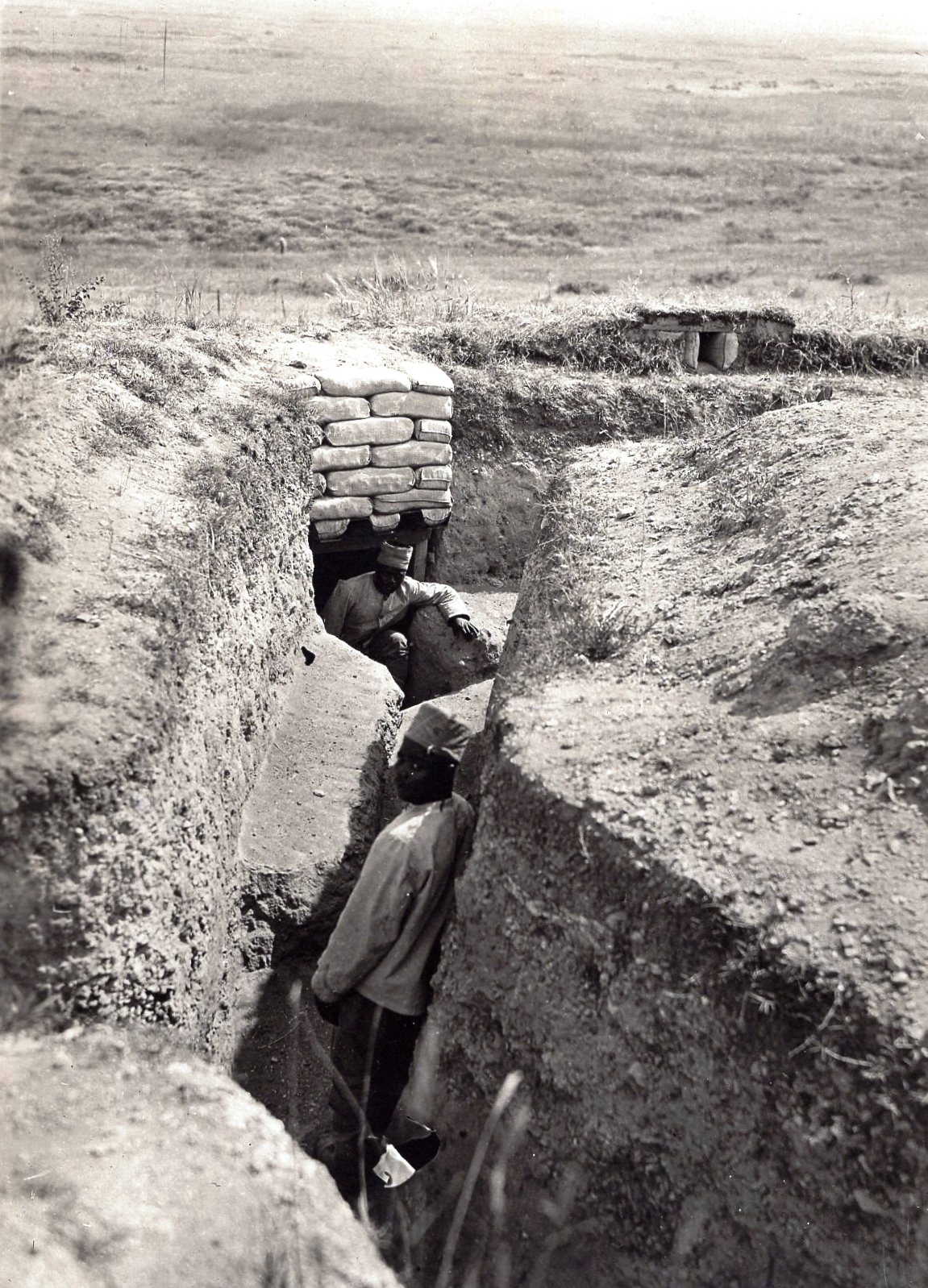
Trenches, Macedonian front, World War I

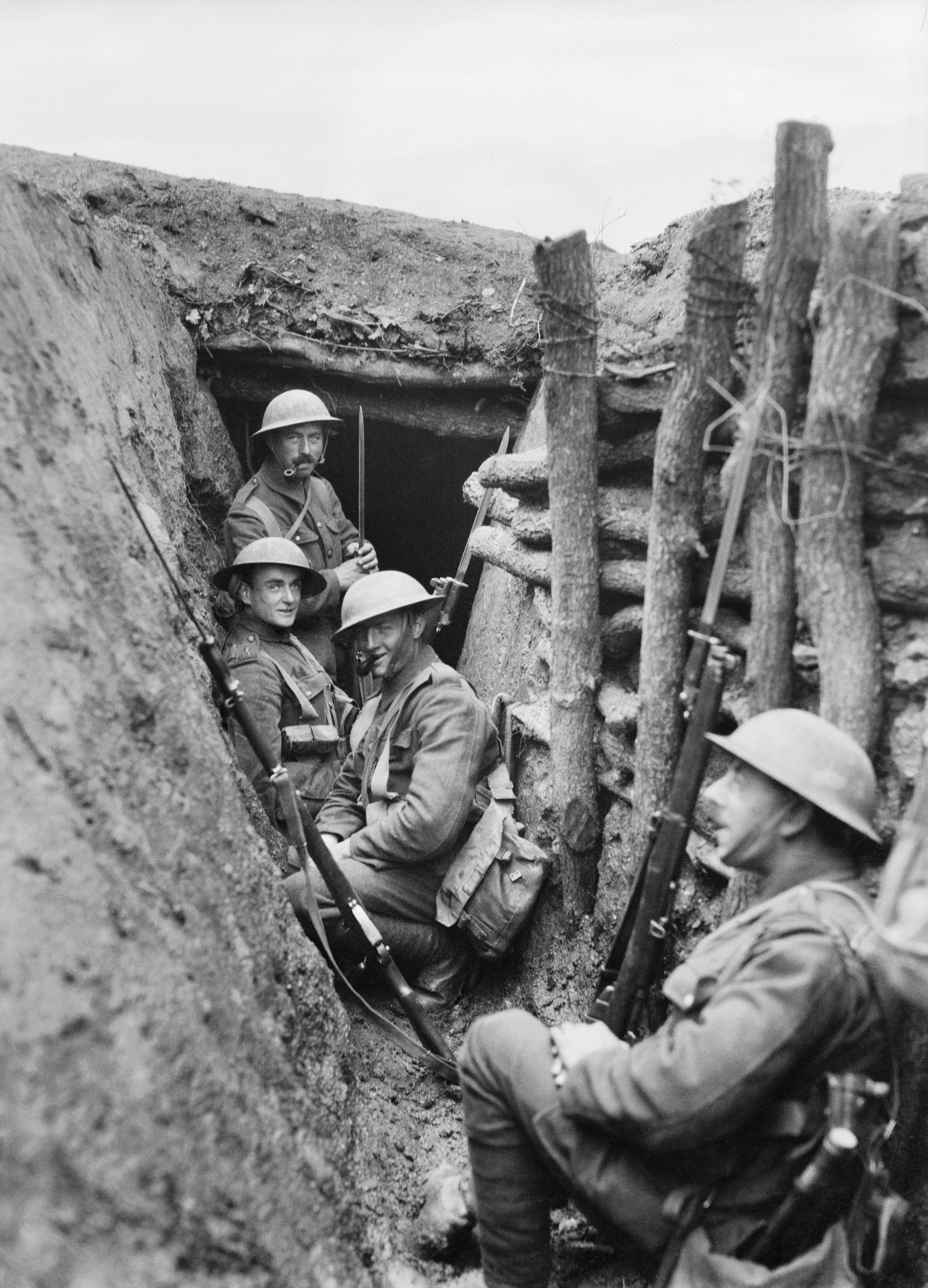
British soldiers of the Royal Fusiliers in a trench

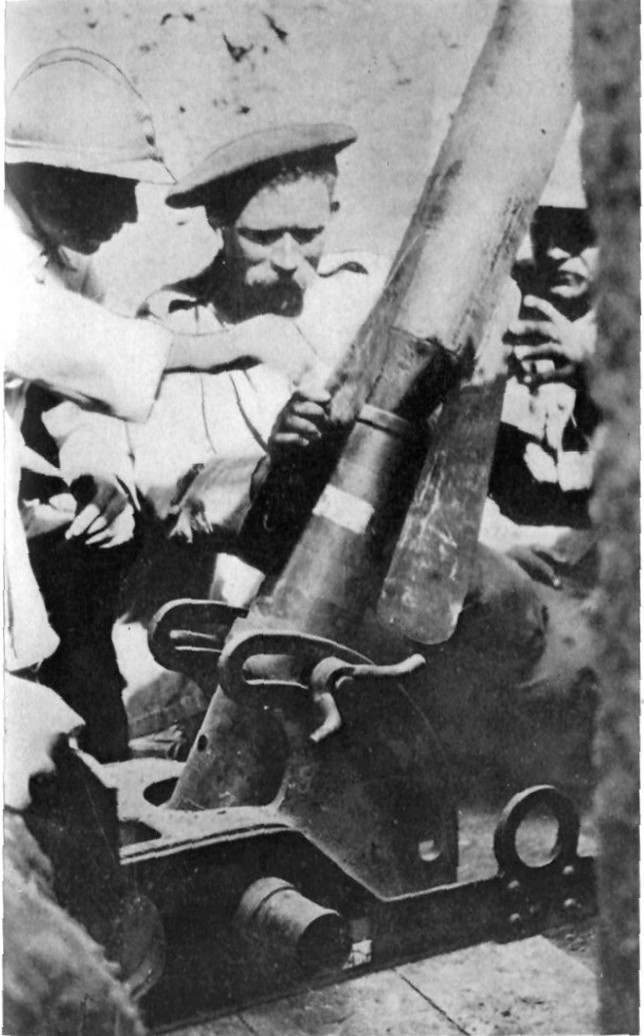
Frenchman instructing Serbian in the use of a trench mortar, 1916–1917

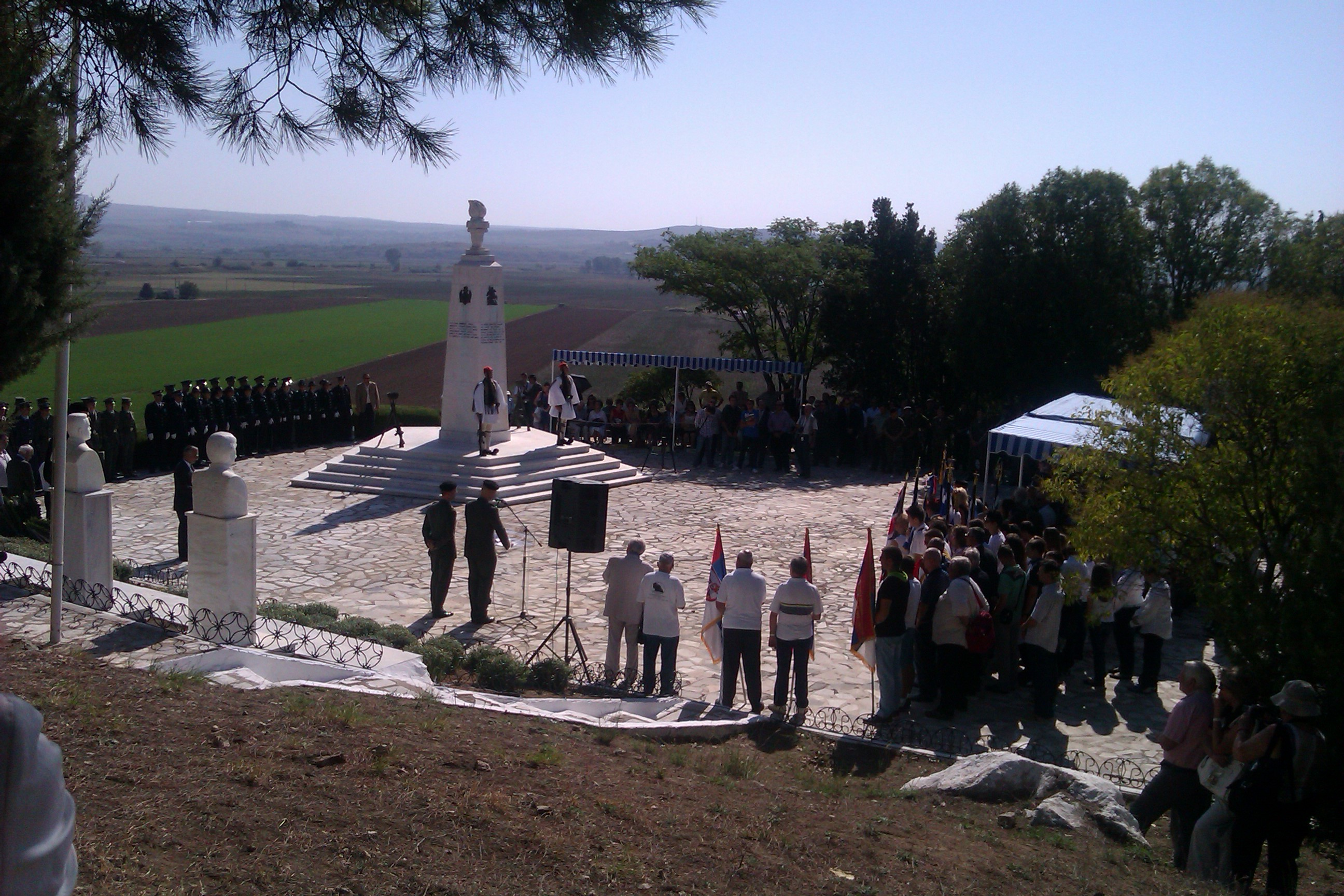
The Monument of the Alliance for the Split of the Macedonian Front, during the 94th anniversary, in Latomeio, Kilkis (constructed in an area donation of Christos Karathodoros)

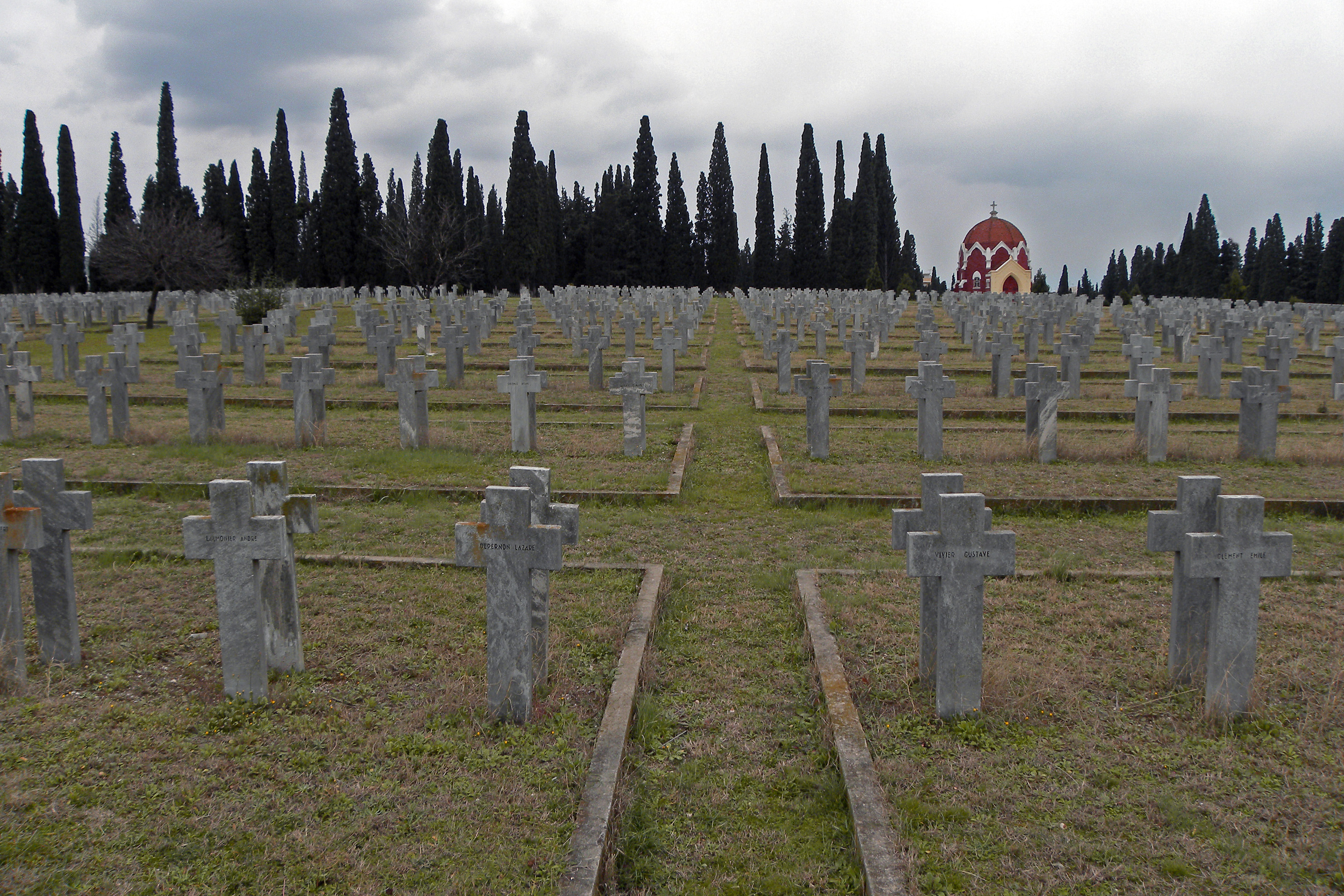
Zeitenlik, Allied cemetery in Thessaloniki

== Bibliography ==
- Axelrod, Alan (2018). How America Won World War I. Rowman & Littlefield. ISBN 978-1493031924.
- Collinson Owen, H. (2012) [1919]. Salonica and After, the Sideshow That Ended the War. Charleston, SC: Forgotten Books. ASIN B008VGLK3Q.
- Dieterich, Alfred (1928). Weltkriegsende an der mazedonischen Front [The End of the World War at the Macedonian Front] (in German). Berlin: Gerhard Stalling. OCLC 248900490.
- Falls, C. (1996) [1933]. Military Operations Macedonia: From the Outbreak of War to the Spring of 1917. History of the Great War Based on Official Documents by Direction of the Historical Section of the Committee of Imperial Defence. Vol. I (Imperial War Museum and Battery Press ed.). London: HMSO. ISBN 089839242X.
- Falls, C. (1996) [1935]. Military Operations Macedonia: From the Spring of 1917 to the End of the War. History of the Great War Based on Official Documents by Direction of the Historical Section of the Committee of Imperial Defence. Vol. II (Imperial War Museum and Battery Press ed.). Nashville, TN: HMSO. ISBN 0898392438.
- Horne, John (2022). "Unintentional Colonialism? The Armée Française d'Orient and Macedonia". In Basil C. Gounaris; Michael Llewellyn-Smith; Ioannis D. Stefanidis (eds.). The Macedonian front, 1915–1918 politics, society and culture in time of war. Abingdon: Routledge Taylor & Francis Group. pp. 28–37. ISBN 9780367353780.
- Geramanis, Athanasios (1980). Πολεμική Ιστορία Νεωτέρας Ελλάδος: Επιχειρήσεις εν Μακεδονία κατά τον Α' παγκόσμιον πόλεμον 1915–1918 [Military History of Modern Greece Operations in Macedonia During WWI 1915–1918] (in Greek). Vol. IV. Athens: Kefallinos.
- McDermott, Alice; Power, Mark (November–December 2006). "'It's a Long Way to Salonika': Irish Soldiers in the Balkans in World War I". History Ireland. 16 (6): 29–34.
- Korsun, Nikolay (1939). Балканский фронт мировой войны 1914–1918 гг [Balkan Front of the World War 1914–1918] (in Russian). Moscow: Boenizdat. OCLC 7970969.
- Omiridis Skylitzes, Aristeidis (1961). Ο Ελληνικός Στρατός κατά τον Πρώτον Παγκόσμιον Πόλεμον, Τόμος Δεύτερος, Η Συμμετοχή της Ελλάδος εις τον Πόλεμον 1918 [Hellenic Army During the First World War 1914–1918: Hellenic Participation in the War 1918] (in Greek). Vol. II. Athens: Hellenic Army History Department.
- Palmer, Alan (2011). The Gardeners of Salonika: The Macedonian Campaign 1915–1918. Faber & Faber. ISBN 978-0571280933.
- Rauchensteiner, Manfried (2014). The First World War And the End of the Habsburg Monarchy, 1914–1918. Vienna: Böhlau Wien. ISBN 9783205793700.
- Reynolds, David (2004). In Command of History: Churchill Fighting and Writing the Second World War. New York: Random House. ISBN 0679457437.
- Strachan, Hew (2022). "The breakthrough on the Salonika front and the German armistice, 1918". In Basil C. Gounaris; Michael Llewellyn-Smith; Ioannis D. Stefanidis (eds.). The Macedonian front, 1915–1918 politics, society and culture in time of war. Abingdon: Routledge Taylor & Francis Group. pp. 219–236. ISBN 9780367353780.
- Thomas, Nigel; Babac, Dusan (2001). Armies in the Balkans 1914–18. Osprey Publishing. ISBN 184176194X.
- Vaidis, Theodoros (1979). Η Βιβλος του Ελευθεριου Βενιζελου:Ιστορια της Νεωτερας Ελλαδος, 1917–1922 [The Bible of Eleftherios Venizelos: History of Modern Greece, 1917–1922] (in Greek). Vol. IV. Athens: Smyrniotakis.
- Villari, Luigi (1922). The Macedonian Campaign. London: T. Fisher Unwin. OCLC 6388448.
