= Sarakinoi =

- Community
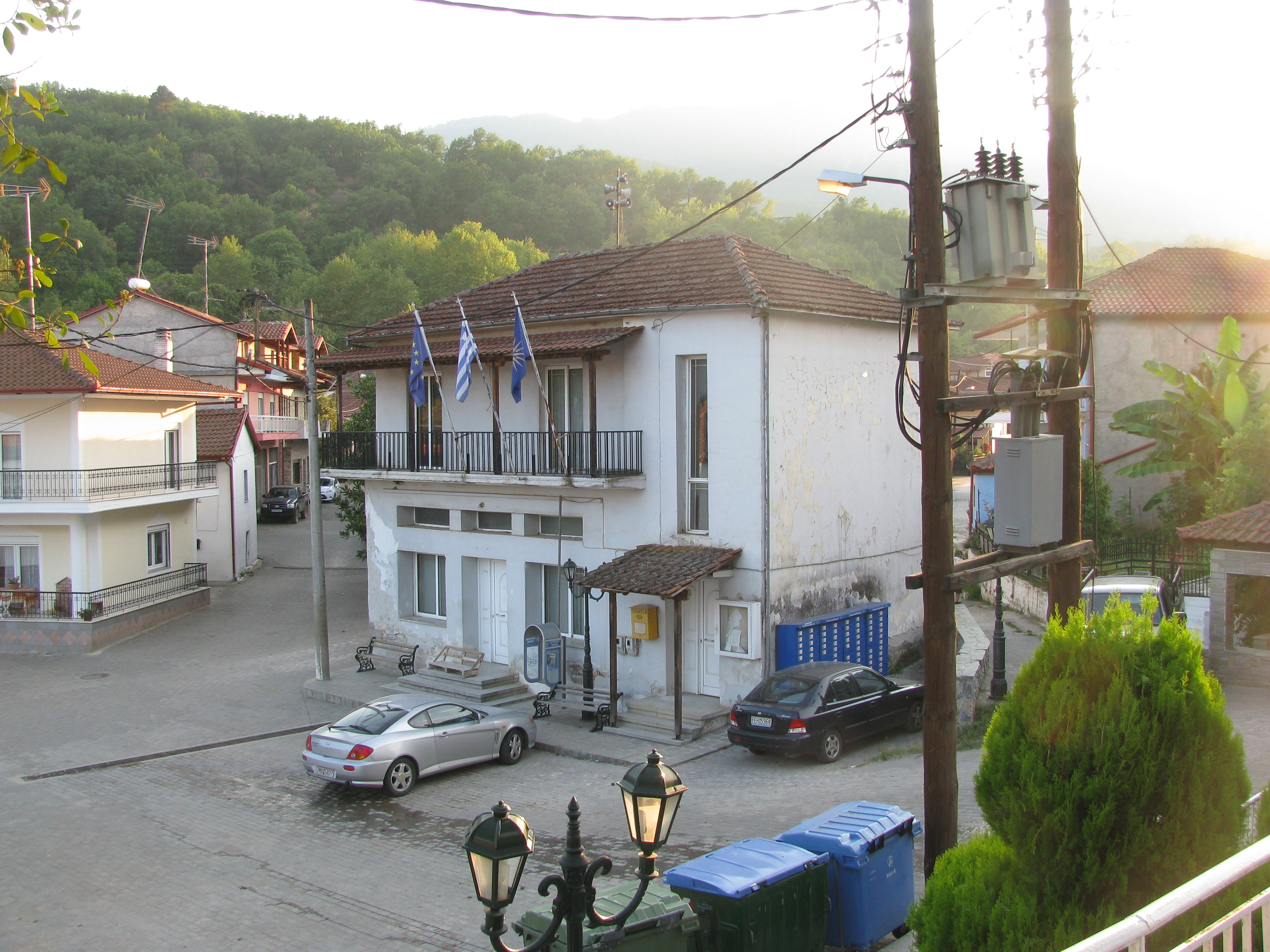
- Sarakinoi

- Location within Greece
- Coordinates: 40°54′56″N 21°57′10″E
- Country: Greece
- Geographic region: Macedonia
- Administrative region: Central Macedonia
- Regional unit: Pella
- Municipality: Almopia
- Municipal unit: Aridaia

Population (2021)
  - Community: 398
- Time zone: UTC+2 (EET)
  - Summer (DST): UTC+3 (EEST)

Sarakinoi (Greek: Σαρακηνοί, before 1925: Σαρακίνοβο – Sarakinovo) is a village and a community in the municipal unit of Aridaia in the western Pella regional unit, Greece. In 2021 its population was 398 for the community, which includes the village Kato Koryfi. Sarakinoi is located in the southeastern part of the Voras Mountains, at 640 m elevation. It is 5 km west of Polykarpi, 6 km south of Loutraki, 11 km southwest of Aridaia and 15 km northwest of Edessa. Forests cover most of the area.

== Demographics ==
Sarakinoi had 356 inhabitants in 1981. In fieldwork done by anthropologist Riki Van Boeschoten in late 1993, Sarakinoi was populated by Slavophones. The Macedonian language was used by people of all ages, both in public and private settings, and as the main language for interpersonal relationships. Some elderly villagers had little knowledge of Greek.

== Notable people ==
- Aggelis Gatsos, Greek revolutionary
- Petros Gatsos, Greek revolutionary
- Dimitrios Gatsos, Greek revolutionary, lieutenant general of the Hellenic Army
- Alexandros Giovannos, commander in the Greek Struggle for Macedonia

== See also ==
- List of settlements in the Pella regional unit
