= Peraia (disambiguation) =

Peraia or Peraea (from Greek: περαία, "land across, opposite") was used in Antiquity to refer most usually to coastal zones claimed by island states. It can also refer to:

- Peraia, Thessaloniki, a suburban city in the Thessaloniki regional unit in Greece
- Peraia, Pella, a village in the Pella regional unit in Greece
- Rhodian Peraia, a historic area of Rhodian rule on the southwestern shores of Asia Minor
- Peraea (Euboea), a town of ancient Euboea
- Perea, a region of Ancient Israel east of the Jordan river

== See also ==
- Galata, formerly known as Pera
- Piraeus
