= Christos Stogiannidis =

Greek chieftain of the Greek Struggle for Macedonia

Christos Stogiannidis (Greek: Χρήστος Στογιαννίδης), also known by the nom de guerre captain Lilis or Iason was a Greek chieftain of the Greek Struggle for Macedonia.

== Biography ==
Stogiannidis was born in 1884 in Ostrovo (now Arnissa) of Pella. He created the National Committee of Ostrovo and joined the Macedonian Defense. He fought against Bulgarian komitadjis initially near the Giannitsa Lake and later near Edessa and Lake Vegoritida. Then, he set up his own armed group, acting in the Voras Mountains, Lake Vegoritida, Edessa and Skydra. In June 1906, in an operation along with fellow Ostrovonites Stavros Chatzicharisis and Pantelis Theodorou they managed to exterminate the Bulgarian komitadji Tane Kliantsev who was terrorizing the Greek population of the region.

The action of Stogiannidis continued until 1908, when the Young Turk revolution stopped the Macedonian Struggle. His actions are considered successful as he managed to drive back the Bulgarian komitadjis northern, notably to Tikveš and Almopia and as he protected the Greek element of the region.

== Sources ==
- John S. Koliopoulos (editor), "Αφανείς, γηγενείς Μακεδονομάχοι", Εταιρεία Μακεδονικών Σπουδών, University Studio Press, Thessaloniki, 2008, p. 121
- Επετηρίς Αγωνιστών Μακεδονικού Αγώνος 1903-1909, αύξων αριθμός 2046
