= Latomeio =

Latomeio (Greek for "quarry") may refer to the following places in Greece:

- Latomeio, Kilkis, a village in the Kilkis regional unit
- Latomeio station, a railway station near Sesklo, on the line from Larissa to Volos
