= Peraia, Pella =

Peraia Περαία
- Community
- Location within Greece
- Coordinates: 40°44′17″N 21°49′19″E
- Country: Greece
- Administrative region: Central Macedonia
- Regional unit: Pella
- Municipality: Edessa
- Municipal unit: Edessa

Government
  - Mayor: Ioannis Tsepkentzis (since 2023)

Population (2021)
  - Community: 309
- Time zone: UTC+2 (EET)
  - Summer (DST): UTC+3 (EEST)
- Postal code: 58002
- Area code: +30 (23810)

Peraia (Greek: Περαία, before 1927: Κότσανα – Kotsana) is a village in the Pella regional unit of Macedonia, Greece, on the bank of Lake Vegoritida. The village is located south of the town of Arnissa within the Vegoritida municipal unit, which belongs to the municipality of Edessa.

== Demographics ==
The village was formerly inhabited by a Turkish-speaking Muslim population.

The Greek census (1920) recorded 1,404 people in the village, and in 1923, there were 1,300 who were Muslim. Following the Greek–Turkish population exchange, in Kotsana, there were 203 refugee families from Asia Minor in 1926. The Greek census (1928) recorded 586 village inhabitants. In 1928, there were 136 refugee families (588 people).

The Greek refugees came from locations in Asia Minor, including Kuri, Peladari, Tsanakalai, Appoloniatha, as well as Armenia.

The current population is estimated at 300.
