= Nature and Folklore Museum of Loutra Almopias =

Museum in Loutra Almopias, Greece

Coordinates: 40.970690°N 21.913980°E

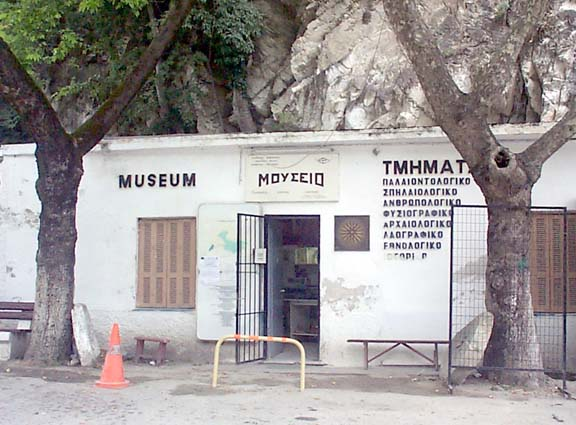
Outside View

The Nature and Folklore Museum of Loutra Almopias is a museum located near the Pozar Baths, about 2.8 kilometres (1.7 miles) west of the town of Loutraki in Pella, Greece.

The First Panhellenic Spelaeological Survey of Northern Greece was carried out in 1990. The survey brought to light a great many important finds, which had to be housed somewhere. The community of Loutra Almopias decided to display them together with folklore material on the present site.

The exhibition consists of palaeontological finds, such as the remains of a bear that lived 110,000 years ago (from Cave I at Loutra Almopias), and Neolithic finds (stone tools, mainly axes of various sizes, a stone arrowhead, a bone needle for sewing, and potsherds) from Cave II. There is also a small collection of minerals.

In the folklore section, visitors may see exhibits relating to the local folk culture, such as a womans day dress from 1950, musical instruments, implements for spinning, weaving, knitting, and cooking utensils.

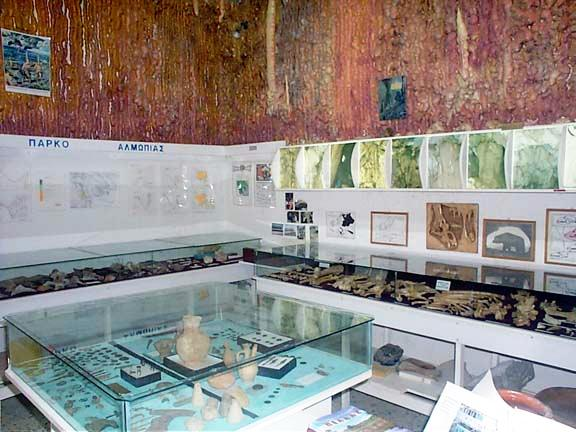
Interior View

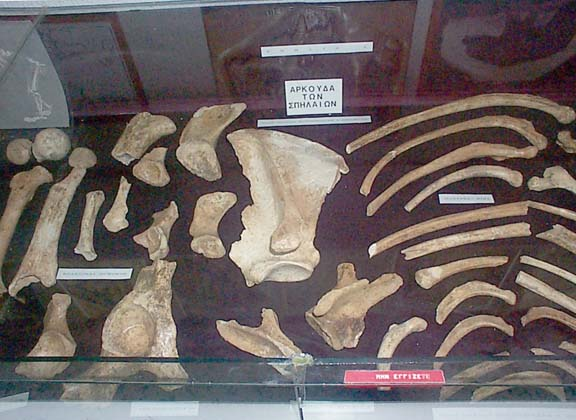
The remains of a prehistoric bear

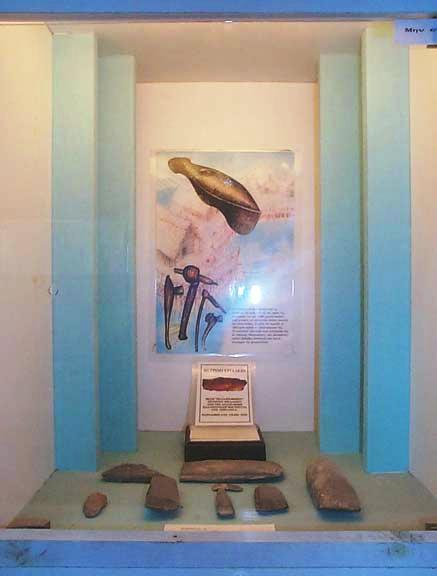
Stone tools of the Neolithic period

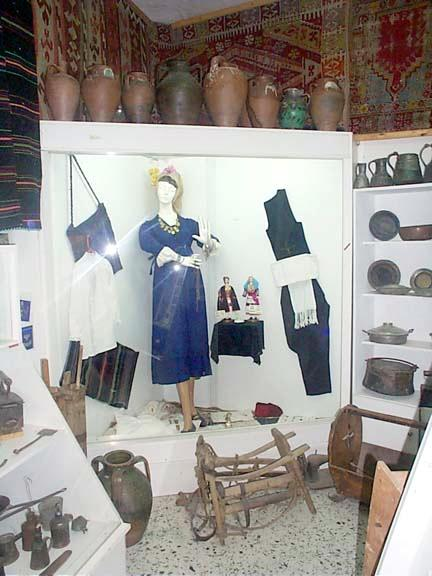
Traditional local costume

== Sources ==
- This article incorporates text from the corresponding article at the Museums of Macedonia website, commissioned by the Macedonian Heritage foundation, written by Vlasis Vlasidis, and published under a CC-BY-SA-3.0 license.
