= Panagitsa Folklore Museum =

Museum in Panagitsa, Greece

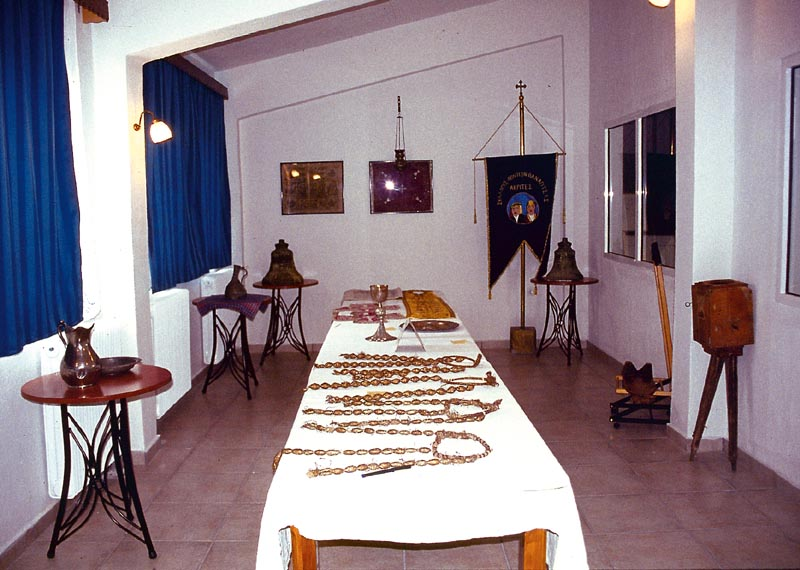
Interior view

The Panagitsa Folklore Museum was created by the Cultural Society of Pontic Greek refugees of Akrita Panagitsa in a room in the Community Hall of the village. Panagitsa is a village at a distance of 10 kilometres from the junction between the Edessa-Florina National Road and the Arnissa road in Central Macedonia, Greece. Most items in the collection are from the area of Pontus in the Black Sea.

Exhibits include farming tools, traditional dress, firearms and domestic utensils. There are also some ecclesiastical items on display (holy lamps, bells, icons, wreaths, and an altar cloth dating from 1724), an old camera and a large collection of books from the Urban School of Akra.

== Sources ==
- This article incorporates text from the corresponding article at the Museums of Macedonia website, commissioned by the Macedonian Heritage foundation, written by Vlasis Vlasidis, and published under a CC-BY-SA-3.0 license.
