= Diacres =

Diacres or Diakres (Ancient Greek: Διακρες), also known as Diacres of the Chalcidians (Διακρες ἀπὸ Χαλκιδέον), was a town of ancient Euboea. It is mentioned in an Athenian decree of the year 425/4 BCE that registers both Diacres and Diacria, therefore both are considered to be different places. Diacres belonged to the Delian League since it appears in the tribute lists of Athens between at least 434/3 BCE and 416/5 BCE.

Its exact location is unknown, but it is supposed to be located in the northern part of the territory of Chalcis.
