= Kato Koryfi =

- Settlement
- Location within Greece
- Coordinates: 40°55′00″N 21°55′38″E
- Country: Greece
- Geographic region: Macedonia
- Administrative region: Central Macedonia
- Regional unit: Pella
- Municipality: Almopia
- Municipal unit: Aridaia
- Community: Sarakinoi

Population (2021)
  - Total: 78
- Time zone: UTC+2 (EET)
  - Summer (DST): UTC+3 (EEST)

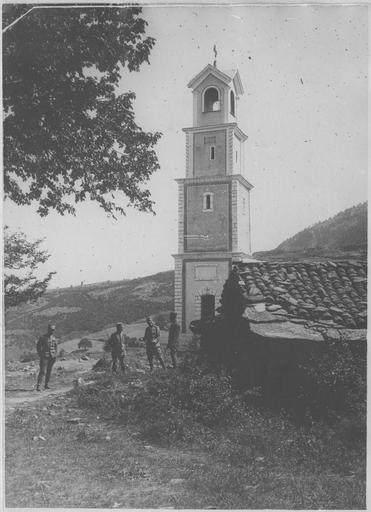
Yugoslavia Church Minaret

Kato Koryfi (Greek: Κάτω Κορυφή, before 1925: Κάτω Ράδοβος – Kato Radovos) is a village in Pella regional unit, Macedonia, Greece.

Kato Koryfi had 126 inhabitants in 1981. In fieldwork done by anthropologist Riki Van Boeschoten in late 1993, Kato Koryfi was populated by Slavophones. The Macedonian language was used by people of all ages, both in public and private settings, and as the main language for interpersonal relationships. Some elderly villagers had little knowledge of Greek.
