= Loutraki, Pella =

Loutraki
- Community
- Location within Greece
- Coordinates: 40°58′20″N 21°56′48″E
- Country: Greece
- Geographic region: Macedonia
- Administrative region: Central Macedonia
- Regional unit: Pella
- Municipality: Almopia
- Municipal unit: Aridaia

Population (2021)
  - Community: 1,176
- Time zone: UTC+2 (EET)
  - Summer (DST): UTC+3 (EEST)

Loutraki (Greek: Λουτράκι; before 1922: Κάτω Πόζαρ – Káto Pózar; until 1959: Κάτω Λουτράκιον – Káto Loutrákion Macedonian: Пожарско) is a village in Pella regional unit, Macedonia, Greece.

Loutraki had 1066 inhabitants in 1981. In fieldwork done by anthropologist Riki Van Boeschoten in late 1993, Loutraki was populated by Slavophones. The Macedonian language was used by people of all ages, both in public and private settings, and as the main language for interpersonal relationships. Some elderly villagers had little knowledge of Greek.

== Transport ==
Loutraki is served by Pella Provincial Road 7, from Aridaia.

== Places of interest ==
- Nature and Folklore Museum of Loutra Almopias
- Pozar Baths
