= Dobro Pole =

Dóbro Pólie
- Dobro Pole
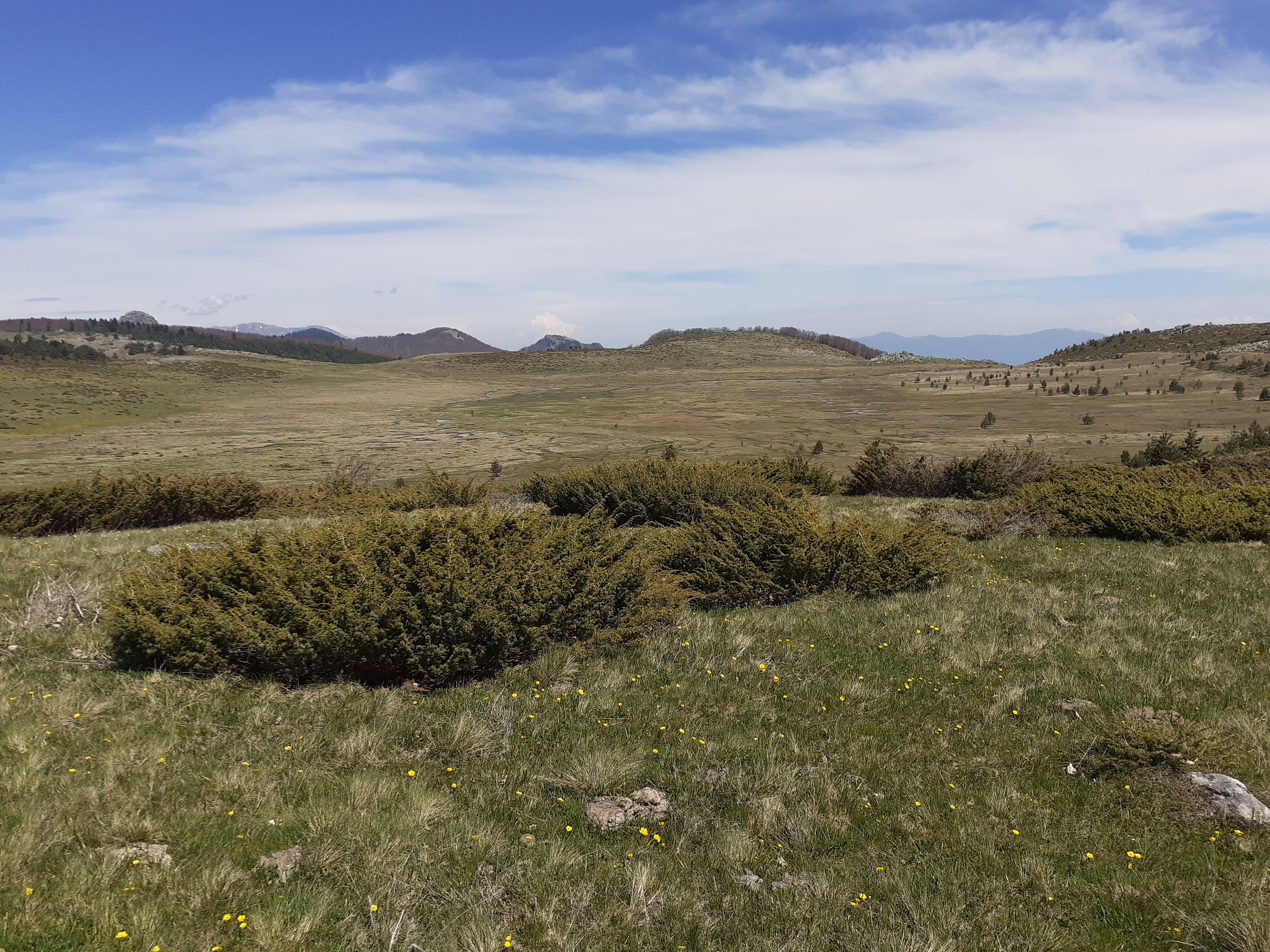

Highest point
- Elevation: 1,523 m (4,997 ft)
- Coordinates: 41°03′00″N 21°53′00″E

Geography
- Location within North Macedonia
- Location: Border between North Macedonia and Greece

Dobro Pole or Dóbro Pólie (Macedonian: Добро Поле; Bulgarian: Добро Поле; Serbian: Добро Поље; Greek: Ντόμπρο Πόλε, romanized: Ntómpro Póle) is a peak situated on the Greece–North Macedonia border.

The nearest villages are Zoviḱ in the Novaci Municipality in the Mariovo region of North Macedonia, and Prómachoi in the Voras Mountains in the Pella regional unit, northern Greece.

The World War I Battle of Dobro Pole was fought here from 15 to 18 September 1918.
