= Agios Athanasios, Pella =

Agios Athanasios Άγιος Αθανάσιος
- Community
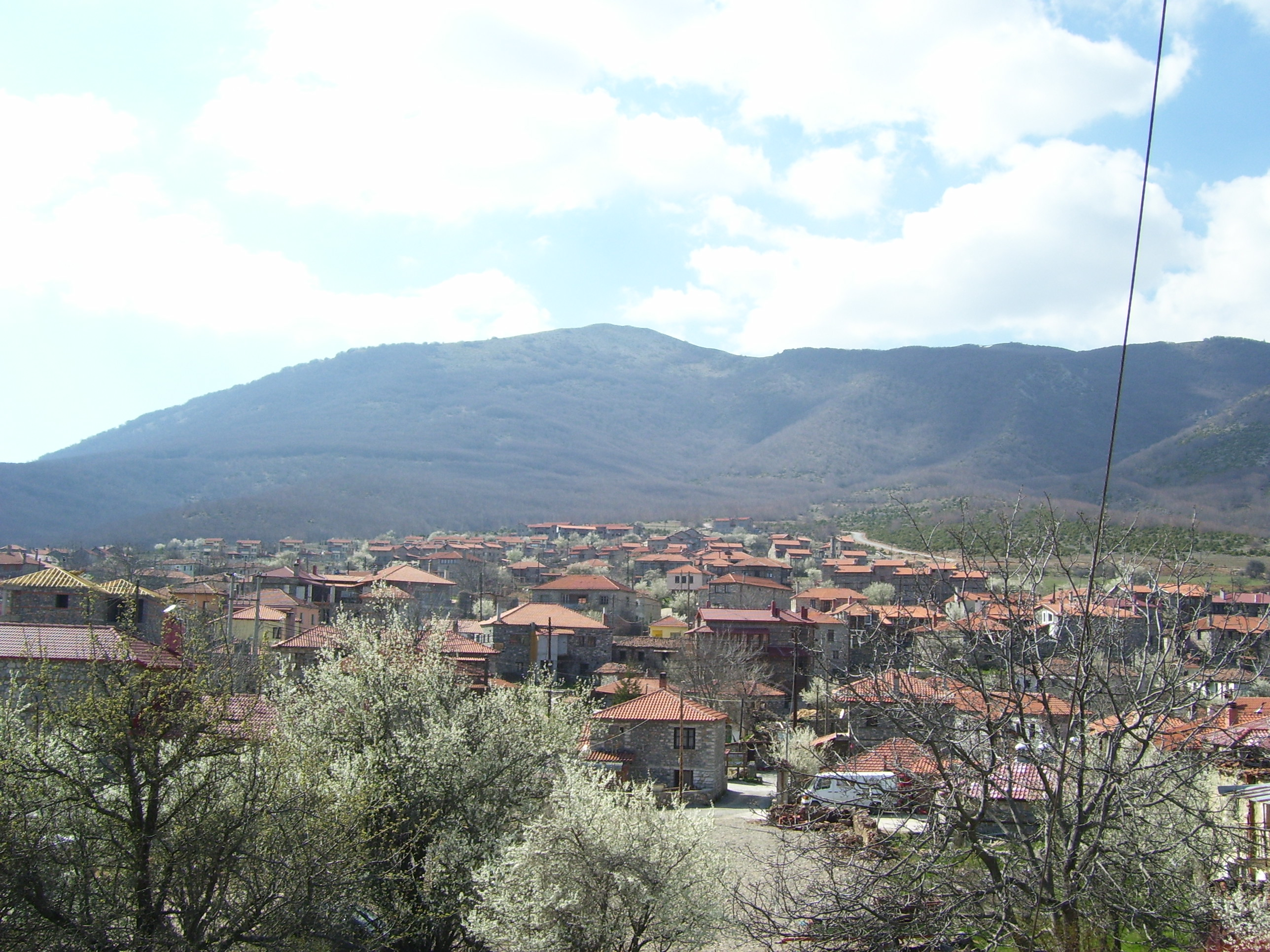

- Location within Greece
- Coordinates: 40°50′N 21°47′E
- Country: Greece
- Administrative region: Central Macedonia
- Regional unit: Pella
- Municipality: Edessa
- Municipal unit: Vegoritida

Population (2021)
  - Community: 448
- Time zone: UTC+2 (EET)
  - Summer (DST): UTC+3 (EEST)

Agios Athanasios (Greek: Άγιος Αθανάσιος, before 1926: Τσεγάνη) village in the Pella regional unit of Macedonia, Greece. The village is located north of Lake Vegoritida within the Vegoritida municipal unit which belongs to the municipality of Edessa.

== History ==
The old village, formerly known as "Tsegani" was built in the late 16th century by breeders and builders, likely coming from Epirus and was ruled under Ali Pasha of Ioannina.

The village was abandoned in the 1980s after an earthquake struck the area. The residents built a new village 6km lower than the old village. After a ski resort was built 17 kilometres (11 mi) from Agios Athanasios in Kaimaktsalan, the village started to gain more tourists, predominantly skier.
