= Peraea (Euboea) =

Peraea or Peraia (Ancient Greek: Περαία) was a town of ancient Euboea. It is attested by epigraphic evidence that Peraea was a deme of Eretria in the 3rd century BCE. It has been inferred, therefore, that probably in the 5th and 4th centuries BCE it was an autonomous polis (city-state) and as in the cases of Grynchae and Styra, its inhabitants were then integrated into the six pre-existing Eretrian tribes. However, unlike Grynchae and Styra, it does not appear in the tribute records of Athens, which is why some believe that Peraea might be identified with Diacria, which does appear in some of these records. In any case, its exact location is unknown.
