= Vegoritida =

Vegoritida Βεγορίτιδα
- Municipal unit
- Location within the regional unit

- Location within Greece
- Coordinates: 40°47′N 21°51′E
- Country: Greece
- Administrative region: Central Macedonia
- Regional unit: Pella
- Municipality: Edessa

Area
  - Municipal unit: 290.0 km^{2} (112.0 sq mi)

Population (2021)
  - Municipal unit: 3,197
  - Municipal unit density: 11.02/km^{2} (28.55/sq mi)
- Time zone: UTC+2 (EET)
  - Summer (DST): UTC+3 (EEST)
- Vehicle registration: ΕΕ

Vegoritida (Greek: Βεγορίτιδα) is a former municipality in the Pella regional unit, Greece. Since the 2011 local government reform it is part of the municipality Edessa, of which it is a municipal unit. The municipal unit has an area of 289.987 km^{2}. Population 3,197 (2021). The seat of the municipality was in Arnissa. The municipality was named after the Lake Vegoritida, and is situated on the northeastern shore of this lake.
