= Arnissa =

Town in Central Macedonia, Greece

Arnissa Άρνισσα
- Community
- Location within Greece
- Coordinates: 40°48′N 21°50′E
- Country: Greece
- Administrative region: Central Macedonia
- Regional unit: Pella
- Municipality: Edessa
- Municipal unit: Vegoritida

Population (2021)
  - Community: 1,370
- Time zone: UTC+2 (EET)
  - Summer (DST): UTC+3 (EEST)
- Postal code: 58002
- Area code: 23810

Arnissa (Greek: Άρνισσα, before 1926: Όστροβον, Ostrovon;, Bulgarian: Острово, Ostrovo) is a town in the Pella regional unit of Macedonia, Greece. It is located near the Lake Vegoritida and Mount Kaimakchalan and is the seat of the Vegoritida Municipality. It has a population of 1,370 (as of 2021).

During the ancient period it was called Arnissa (Ancient Greek: Ἄρνισσα) and Arnisa (Ancient Greek: Ἄρνισα).

== History ==
The settlement is first mentioned by Thucydides as one of the most ancient Macedonian cities, which is identified with the ancient ruins near the present-day village of the same name, specifically on the small peninsula of Lake Vegoritida, where various archaeological findings (architectural members and inscriptions) were found.

Thucydides writes that during Brasidas's strategic retreat through a difficult mountain pass following a confrontation with Arrhabaeus and his allies in the region of Lyncus, he managed to reach Arnisa safely. Arnisa was within Perdiccas's territory, who was his ally.

The region came under the control of the Roman empire in the 1st century BC.

At the beginning of the 11th century, Ostrovo was a Bulgarian fortress, attacked unsuccessfully by the troops of the Byzantine emperor Basil II around 1015 and around 1017. The fortress fell under Byzantine control after the mass capitulation at the end of the Bulgarian-Byzantine war. The Battle of Ostrovo was fought near the town in 1041.

At the end of the 14th century, with the Ottoman conquest, Ostrovo became the seat of a mudirlik. In 1798 it came under the jurisdiction of Ali Pasha.

At the end of the 19th century, approximately 300 families lived in the settlement, of which 200 were Christian and the rest Muslim, while the population was Slavic-speaking. At the same time, tensions had begun between the patriarchal and Bulgarian Exarchists, with the latter occupying by force the two most important holy sites of the village. The survey "La Macédoine et sa Population Chrétienne" by Dimitar Mishev concluded that the Christian population in 1905 was composed of 768 Bulgarian Exarchists and 272 Bulgarians, subordinate to the Patriarchate of Constantinople.

During the Macedonian Struggle, some Ostrovites participated in the Greek guerrilla forces, with the main Macedonian fighters being the chieftain Christos Stogiannidis. Clashes took place in the area between the Greek and Turkish armies on 3 and 4 November 1912 during the Balkan Wars.

== Sights ==
In 1953, when the waters of the lake receded, the ruins of a prehistoric necropolis were revealed, which are also one of the attractions of the area. The holy churches of the Assumption (1860) and of the Holy Trinity (built in 1865) are also worth mentioning .

== Geography ==
Arnissa is located at an altitude of 560 meters, it is 20 km from Edessa and is located on the border with the prefecture of Florinis, while a short distance away, at an altitude of 1,150 meters, is the old settlement of Agios Athanasios, one of the most famous tourist places in the area.

== Economy ==
Arnissa is known for its apple crops, while there is also a women's cooperative that produces, using traditional means, pasta, spoon sweets, pickles, paprika and compotes.

== Transport ==
The settlement is served by Regional and Proastiakos services to Thessaloniki and Florina.
