= Grynchae =

Town of ancient Euboea

Coordinates: 38°23′01″N 24°09′03″E

Grynchae or Grynchai (Ancient Greek: Γρύγχαι or Γρύνχαι) was a town of ancient Euboea. Probably it is identifiable with the place-names that Stephanus of Byzantium mentions under the variants Rhyncae or Rhynkai (᾿Ρύγκαι) and Trychae or Trychai (Τρύχαι). It belonged to the Delian League since it appears in the tribute lists of Athens between the years 451/0 BCE and 416/5 BCE, where it paid a phoros of 1000 drachmae. At the end of the 5th century BCE, it became a deme of Eretria.

Its site is located near modern Krieza.
