= Diacria (Euboea) =

Diacria or Diakria (Ancient Greek: Διακρία) was a town of ancient Euboea.

It is mentioned by Lycophron, who says that the territory of the Diacrians was one of the places where, according to the prophecies of Cassandra (Alexandra), shipwrecked Hellenes returning from the Trojan War would be found.

Diacria belonged to the Delian League since it appears at least on the lists of tributes to Athens of 429/8 BCE and 417/6 BCE. It is near modern Pili. Its exact location is unknown, although it has been suggested that it could be identified with a deme of Eretria called Peraea.
