= Voras Mountains =

Mountain range on the border between Greece and North Macedonia

- Nidže
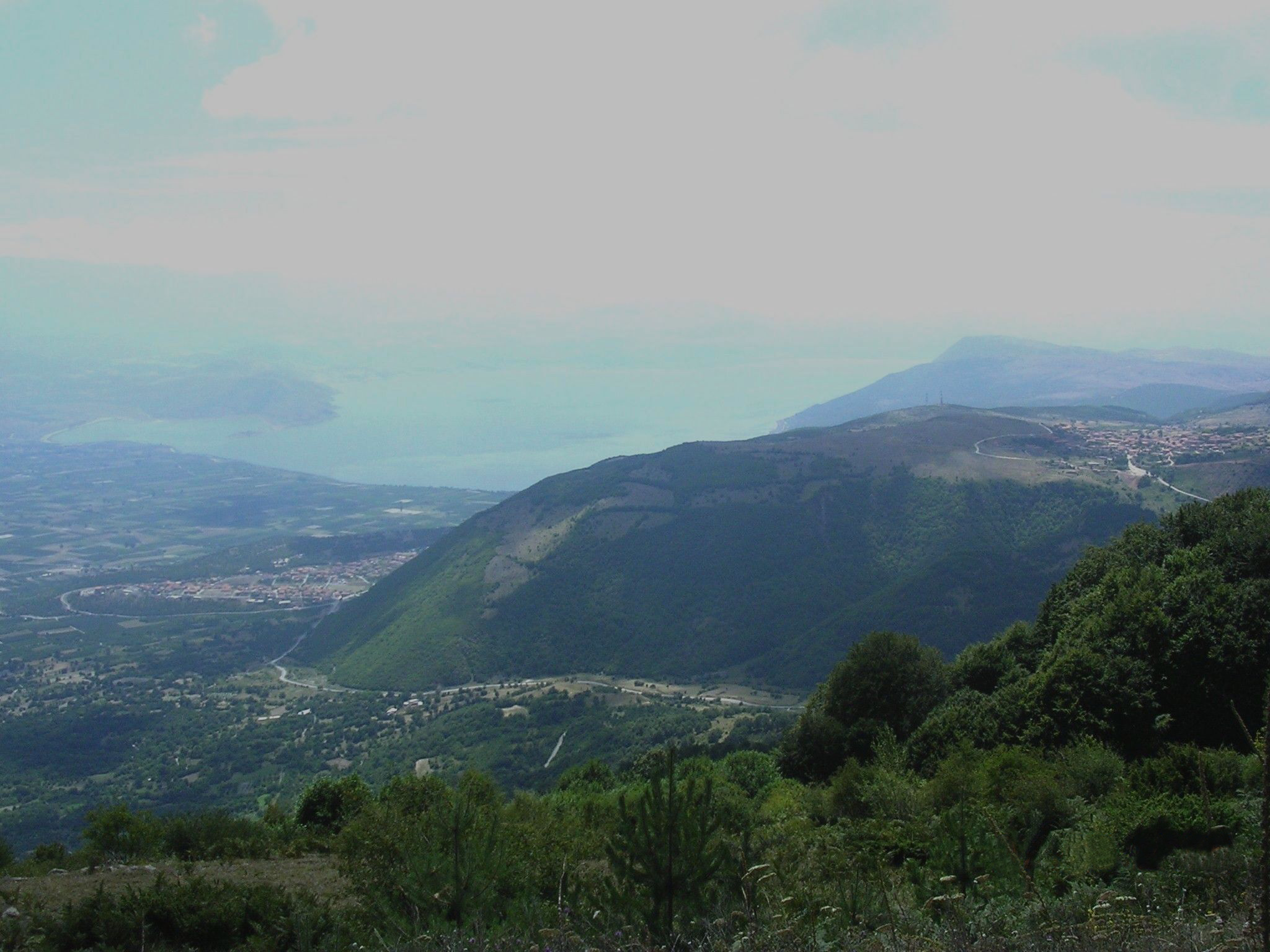
- Village of Agios Athanasios, near the Voras Mountains

Highest point
- Peak: Kaimakchalan
- Elevation: 2,524 m (8,281 ft)

Geography
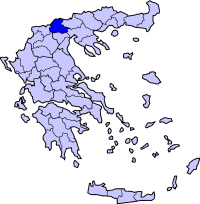
- Location in Greece
- Countries: Greece and North Macedonia

The Voras Mountains (Greek: Όρος Βόρας; also Boras), also known as Nidže (Macedonian: Ниџе, Turkish: Nice Dağı) are a mountain range situated on the border between Greece and North Macedonia. It separates the Pella regional unit on the Greek side in the south from the Mariovo region on the North Macedonia side in the north. The tallest peak in the range is Kaimakchalan at 2,524 m (8,281 ft). Adjacent peaks are Starkov grob (1,876 m) and Dobro Pole (1,700 m).

The mountain range hosts a ski resort and the hot springs at Loutra Loutrakiou (Pozar) on the Greek side.

The mountain can be reached from the town of Bitola and nearby villages on the North Macedonia side.

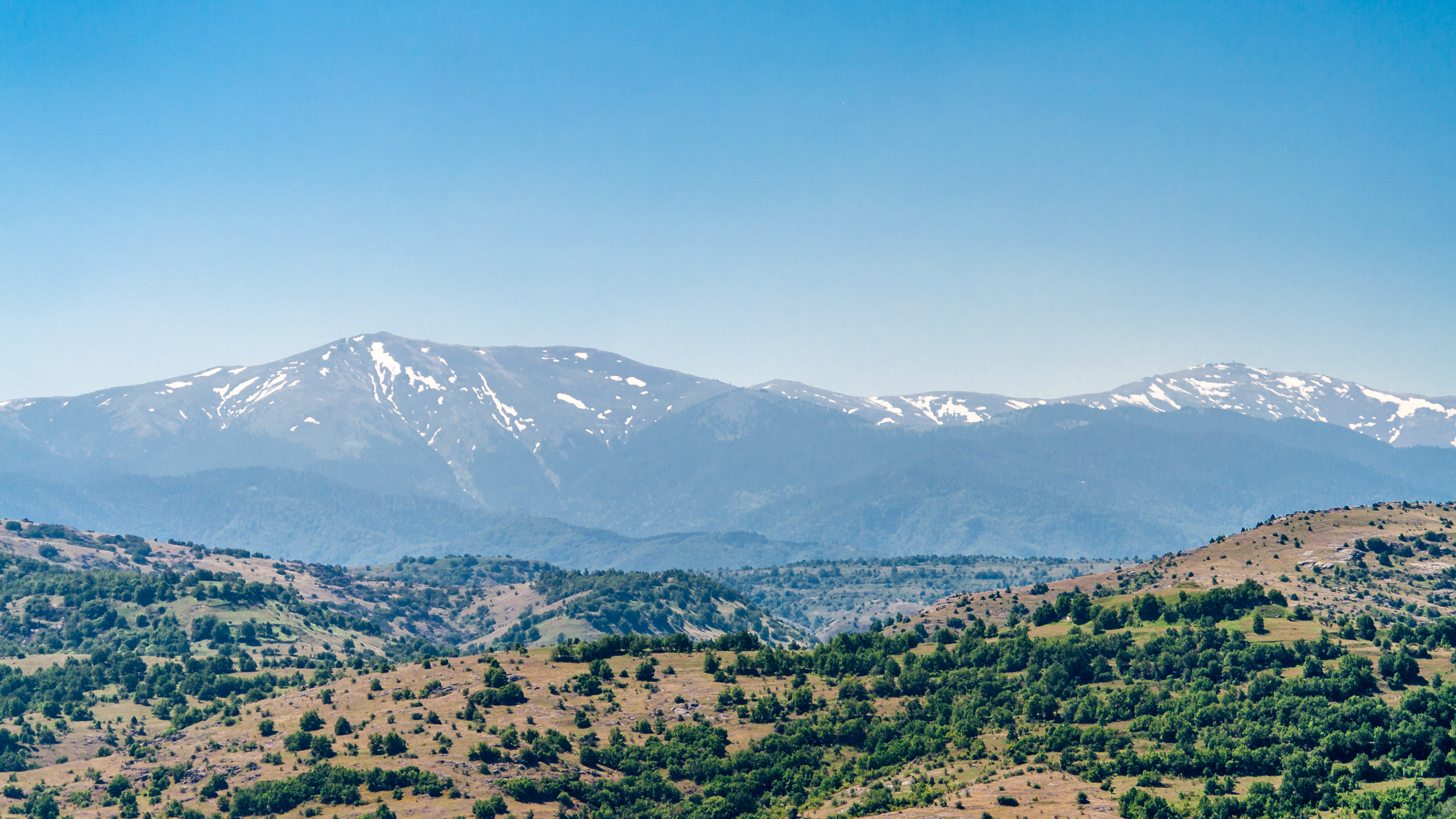
Voras
