= Latomeio, Kilkis =

Village in Central Macedonia, Greece

Coordinates: 41°02′N 22°36′E

Latomeio (Greek: Λατομείο, also: Latomi or Karathodoreika) is a small village of Polykastro municipal unit of the municipality of Paionia, Kilkis regional unit. Its inhabitants were 12 people in 2001 census. The former name was Spantzovon or Spantzion until 1928. It is 5km northeast of Polykastro, near the international road Thessaloniki - Belgrade.

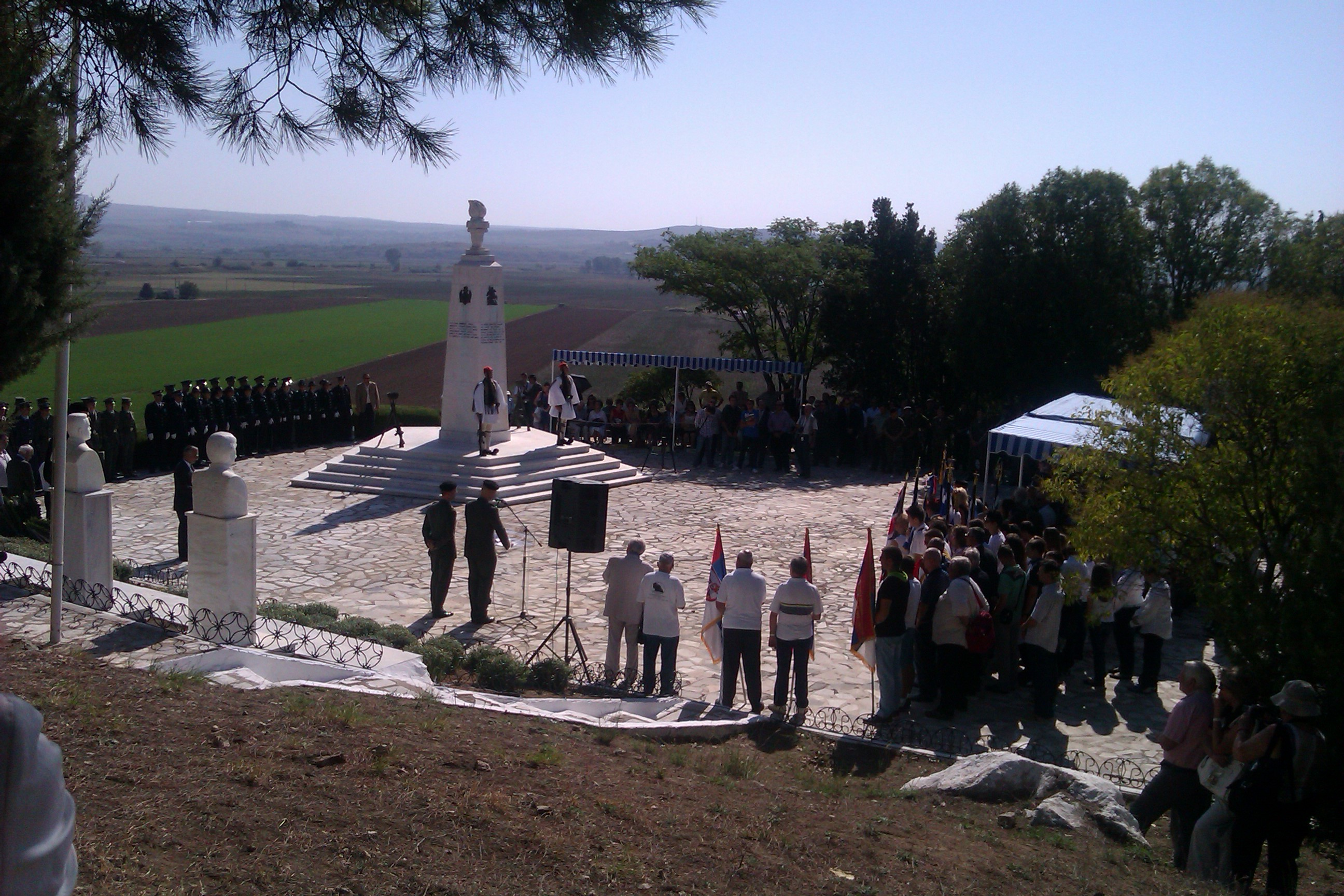
WWI monument

It was abandoned in 1920 after the Neuilly treaty and it was re-inhabited by two Sarakatsani clans (Karathodoros': 5 families and Arkoudas': 1 family), which used to transfer their sheep in Vermion Mountains, in summer.
