= Pozar Baths =

Thermal baths in the region of Macedonia, Greece

Coordinates: 40°58′13″N 21°54′59″E

Pozar thermal baths (Greek: Λουτρά Πόζαρ) are located 32 km north of Edessa and 13 km west of Aridaia in the region of Macedonia, Greece.

The baths are naturally heated at 37 °C (99 °F) and are a popular tourist attraction in the cooler months.
