= Lake Vegoritida =

Lake in Macedonia, Greece

- Λίμνη Βεγορίτιδα (Greek)
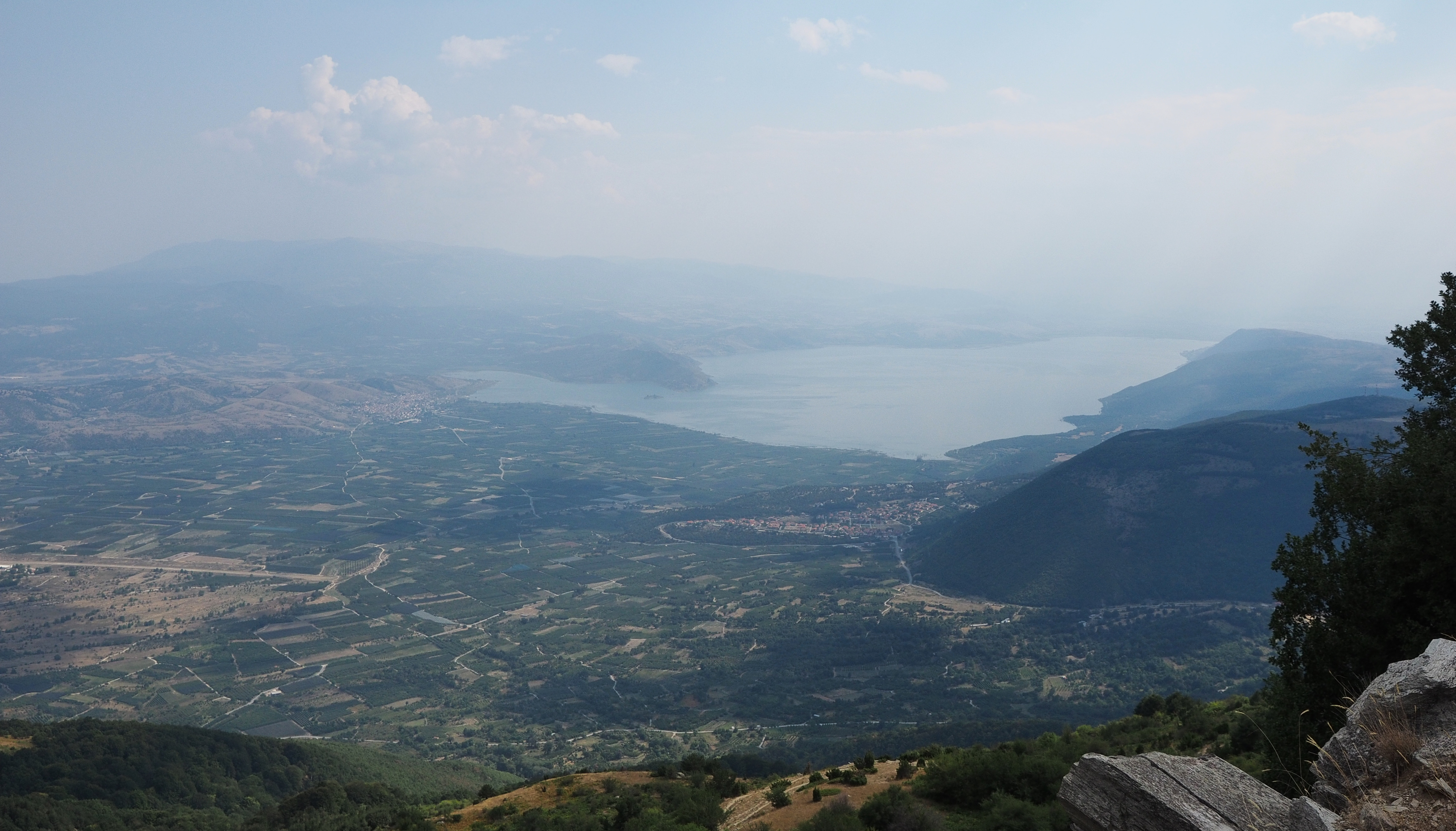
- Lake Vegoritida with a view of the surrounding mountains

- Location within Greece
- Location: Macedonia, Greece
- Coordinates: 40°45′N 21°47′E
- Lake type: Natural
- Primary inflows: Local rivers and streams
- Basin countries: Greece
- Surface area: 54.3 km^{2} (21.0 sq mi)
- Surface elevation: 540 m (1,770 ft)
- Settlements: Peraia, Pella, Arnissa, Agios Panteleimonas

Lake Vegoritida (Greek: Λίμνη Βεγορίτιδα, Limni Vegoritida), also historically referred to as Lake Ostrovo (Greek: Λίμνη Οστρόβου, Limni Ostrovou), is one of the largest natural lakes in northern Greece. Located in the region of Macedonia, it lies 6 km northeast of Amyntaio and 18 km west of Edessa, at an elevation of 540 meters. The Voras Mountains provide a scenic backdrop to the north of the lake, which spans parts of the Florina and Pella regional units.

== See also ==
- List of lakes in Greece
- Ostrovo Unit of the Scottish Women's Hospitals during World War I

== Sources ==
- K. Fytianos, V. Samanidou, T. Agelidis. "Comparative Study of Heavy Metals Pollution in Various Rivers and Lakes of Northern Greece," *Chemosphere*, Vol. 16, Nos. 2/3, pp. 455–462, 1987.
