= Edessan =

Edessan, Edessian, or Edessene may refer to:

- in general:

- someone or something related to the city of Edessa in northern Greece
- someone or something related to the city of Edessa in southeastern Turkey

- in particular:

- Edessan Middle Aramaic language, variant term for the Syriac language
- Edessan Kingdom, ancient kingdom of Osroene, centered in Edessa, modern Turkey
- Edessan County, a Crusader medieval state, centered in Edessa, modern Turkey
- Edessan Chronicle, a chronicle written in the 6th century in Edessa, modern Turkey
- Edessan martyrs, Christian martyrs Shmona and Gurya, martyred in Edessa, modern Turkey
- Edessan Mandylion, a holy relic in Christian tradition of Edessa, modern Turkey
- Edessan Ecclesiastical Museum, an ecclesiastical museum in Edessa, Greece
- Edessan Waterfalls, a waterfall site near Edessa, Greece

== See also ==
- Edessaikos F.C.
