= Varosi =

Neighborhood of Edessa, Central Macedonia, Greece

Coordinates: 40.801385°N 22.053391°E

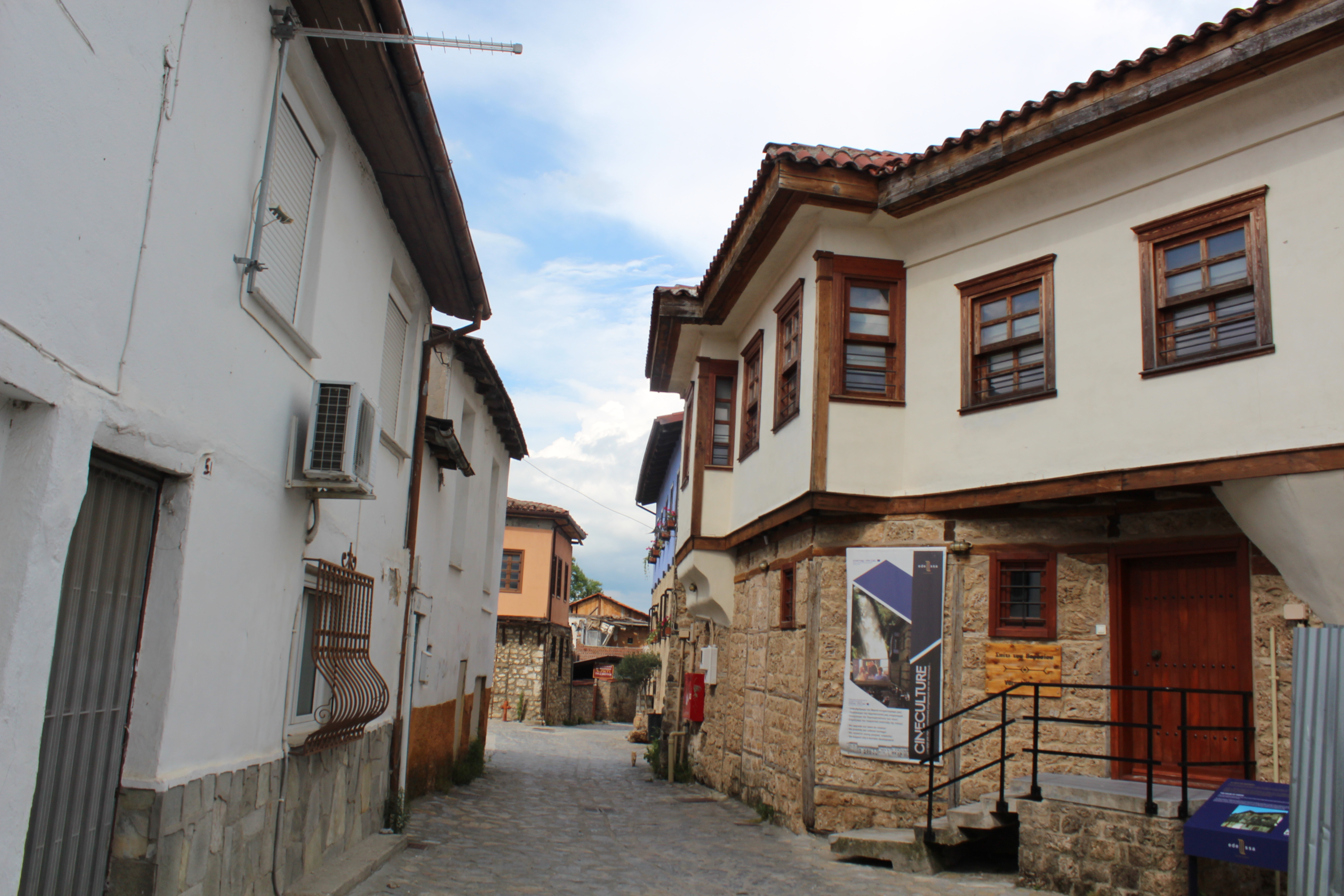
Street in Varosi

Varosi is an old neighbourhood of Edessa, in Central Macedonia, Greece.

== Location ==
The neighbourhood is in the southeast of Edessa, south of the Waterfalls Park. It was originally located next to the rock that had been the site of the Byzantine acropolis, so it is built along the top of a cliff on the remains of the citadel and the city walls, overlooking the site of the ancient city.

== History ==
Varosi was the first Christian section of Edessa. Its walls withstood Turkish bombardment for eight months, after which they were torn down; Christians there continued to worship under the Ottomans.

During the Nazi occupation of Greece, resistance fighters used Varosi as a base, because their knowledge of the neighbourhood and its proximity to the plains made it relatively easy to escape searchers. As a result, the Germans burnt a large part of the neighbourhood in 1944.

Varosi is the only old quarter of the city to have survived. It was declared a traditional settlement in 1983, and has been restored. Several 19th-century houses in traditional Macedonian style are preserved, including some mansions. They characteristically have stone foundations and protruding upper storeys supported by wooden beams.

== Notable buildings ==
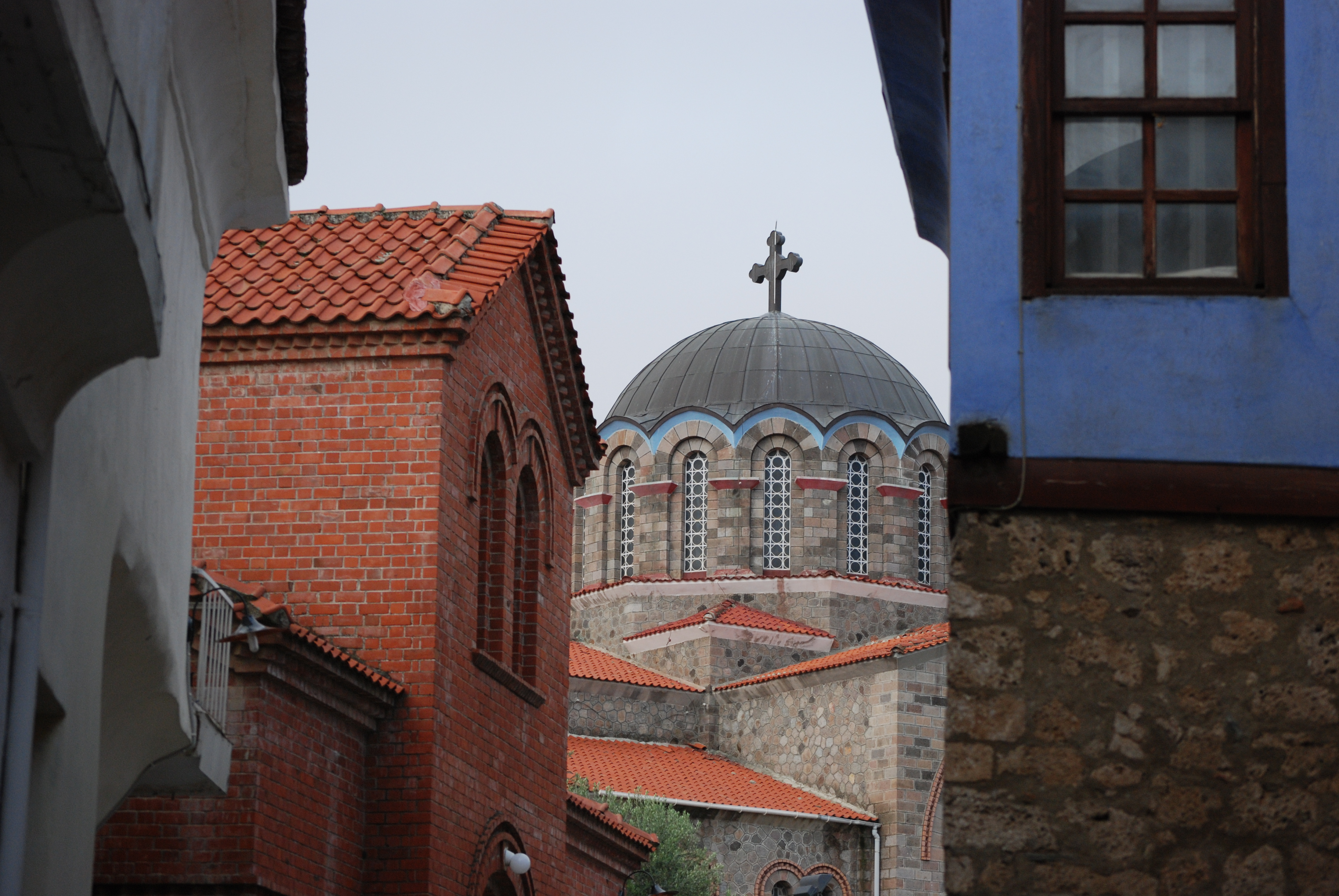
Dome of Intercession of the Blessed Virgin Mary Church (left, Saint Paraskevi Church, Edessa)

- Old Metropolitan Cathedral of Edessa (Church of the Dormition of the Mother of God)
- Saints Peter and Paul Church, Edessa
- Intercession of the Blessed Virgin Mary Church, Edessa
- Edessa Ecclesiastical Museum
- Folklore Museum of Edessa
