= Open-air Water Museum =

Museum in Edessa, Greece

The Open-air Water Museum (Greek: Υπαίθριο Μουσείο Νερού) is located in the city of Edessa, Central Macedonia, Greece. In the early 20th century there were many water-powered workshops in the city. In 1991 the Municipality of Edessa decided to improve and develop the Mills area, the Kannavourgio and the ‘Estia’ works, by establishing an open air, water-power museum, and creating recreation areas. The Open-Air Water Museum, which opened early in 2000, aims to acquaint visitors with the history of water-power from the workshops of pre-industrial times up to the early 20th century.

The museum consists of the buildings of the Mills area and the Old Hemp Factory of Edessa. Within this area there are two flour mills, with their grinding machinery, a water mill and a sesame mill, complete with equipment and capable of operation. They are restored buildings containing authentic machinery which was in use until the mid-1960s. Visitors are therefore able to see how flour and sesame were processed. In one of the flour-mills there is an aquarium with fish from Lake Agra-Nissi in Vretta, which is the only aquarium in Greece with fresh-water fish.

On the same site there is a row of small shops, a multi-purpose hall, a recreation area and an open-air cinema. There are many water channels on the site.

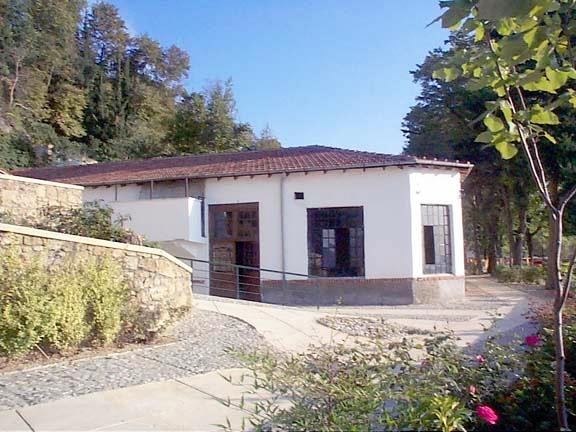
External view of the cordage and rope mill

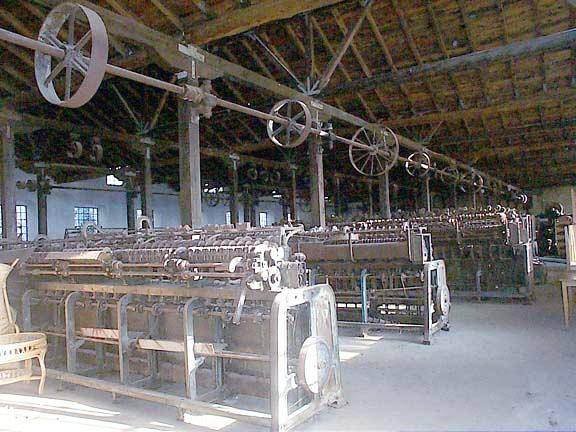
Production section of the cordage and rope mill

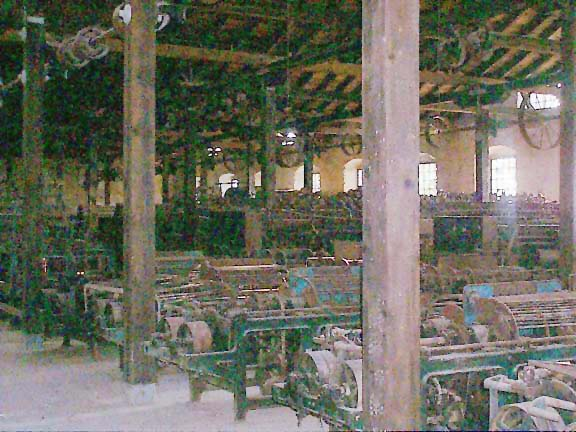
Production section of the cordage and rope mill

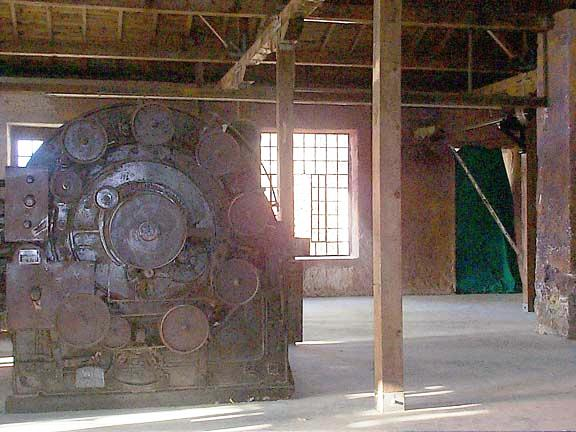
Water driven machinery
