= Old Hemp Factory of Edessa =

Hemp Factory of Edessa
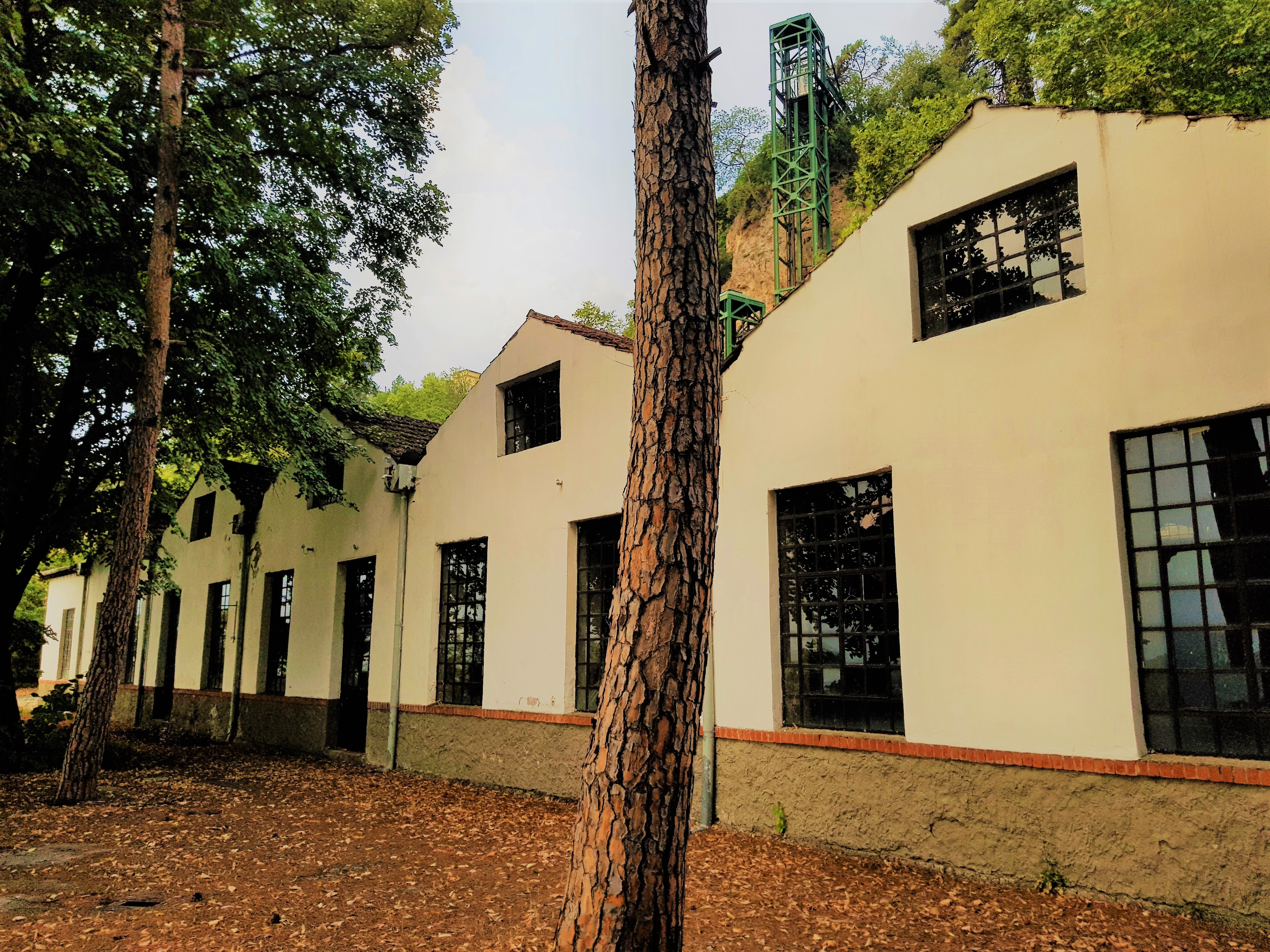
- Interactive map of the Hemp Factory of Edessa area
- Former names: Local Hemp Association

General information
- Status: Ιndestructible
- Type: Factory
- Architectural style: "Industrial European"
- Location: Edessa, Greece
- Coordinates: 40°48′8″N 22°3′20″E
- Elevation: 202
- Construction started: 1908
- Completed: 1911
- Opened: 1912
- Renovated: 1997
- Cost: 11.000.000 drachmas
- Owner: Municipality of Edessa

Height
- Height: 4 metres (13 ft)

Technical details
- Floor count: 2

Design and construction
- Architect: Iason Rizos
- Awards: "National Monument Awards 1997"

Other information
- Parking: Non

Website
- kannavourgio.gr

The Hemp Factory (Greek: Κανναβουργείο) of Edessa, Greece, was an industrial unit focused on the creation of ropes from Indian hemp twine. It was the largest of the four hemp factories in Greece, in production and facilities. It is also a unit of the Water Museum of Edessa, where it is placed at the site "Megalos Kremnos" next to the traditional quarter of the city and the well-known Park of Waterfalls. It operated as a factory until 1967, and then it was abandoned. Later in 1997, the factory turned into a Recreation and Education Center, where it continues to operate until 2014, when it is finally closed.

== Establishment ==
The founding of the company was made in 1908 by the company Totskas and Co. and other smaller shareholders from Thessaloniki, who wanted to develop the textile industry in Greece. The choice of location where the factory was built was because Edessa's wider area was abundant in waterfalls where it would help to operate the engines as they were supported by waterworks. Its address was assigned to the experienced industrialist Iraklis Hatzidimoula

== Acme 1928-1950 ==
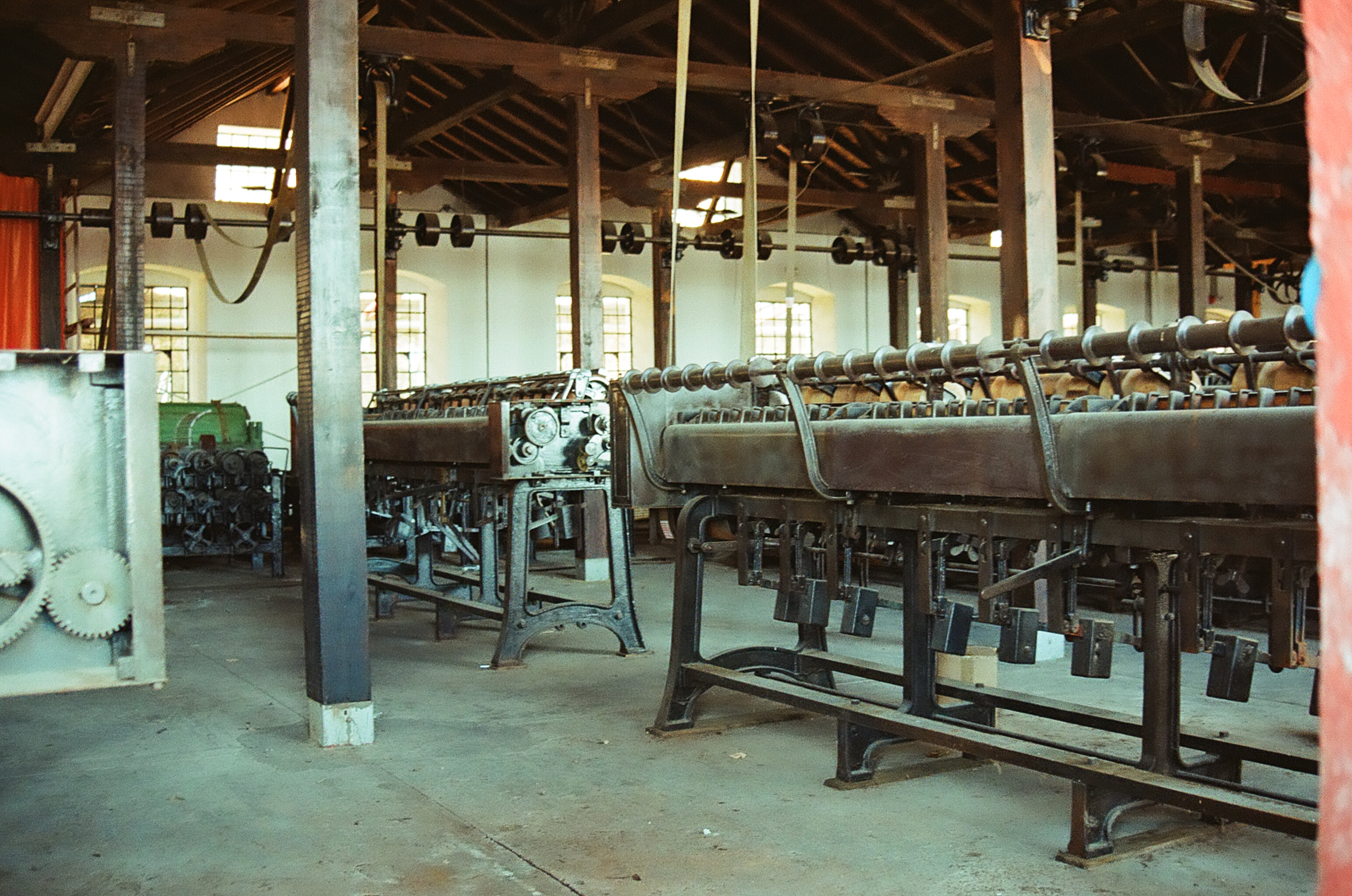
The main building where ropes been created.

The full edge of the factory is placed in the period 1928 - 1940, during which it employs 150 workers (mainly from Edessa). Particularly during the interwar period, the factory covered the demand for fabrics and twine all over Greece. Coarse ropes went to Crete (the largest consumption center), to Thessaly and Epirus, while the thin ropes in Eastern Macedonia and Thrace. However, there was a stagnation in the distribution of products between October and March.

== Decline 1952-1966 ==
The loss of aquaculture acquis, the amount of debts to banks, shareholders' disputes, and government led to bankruptcy and closure of the factory in May 1966. The 100 workers of the Hemp Factory founded the "Production Cooperative Pella" and undertake its management. Later in 1967, the management committee asked I.S.R.S (Industrial Safety Regulation Staff) a loan to continue the factory operation, but in vain. The factory closed and the state became the owner.

== Factory Complex ==
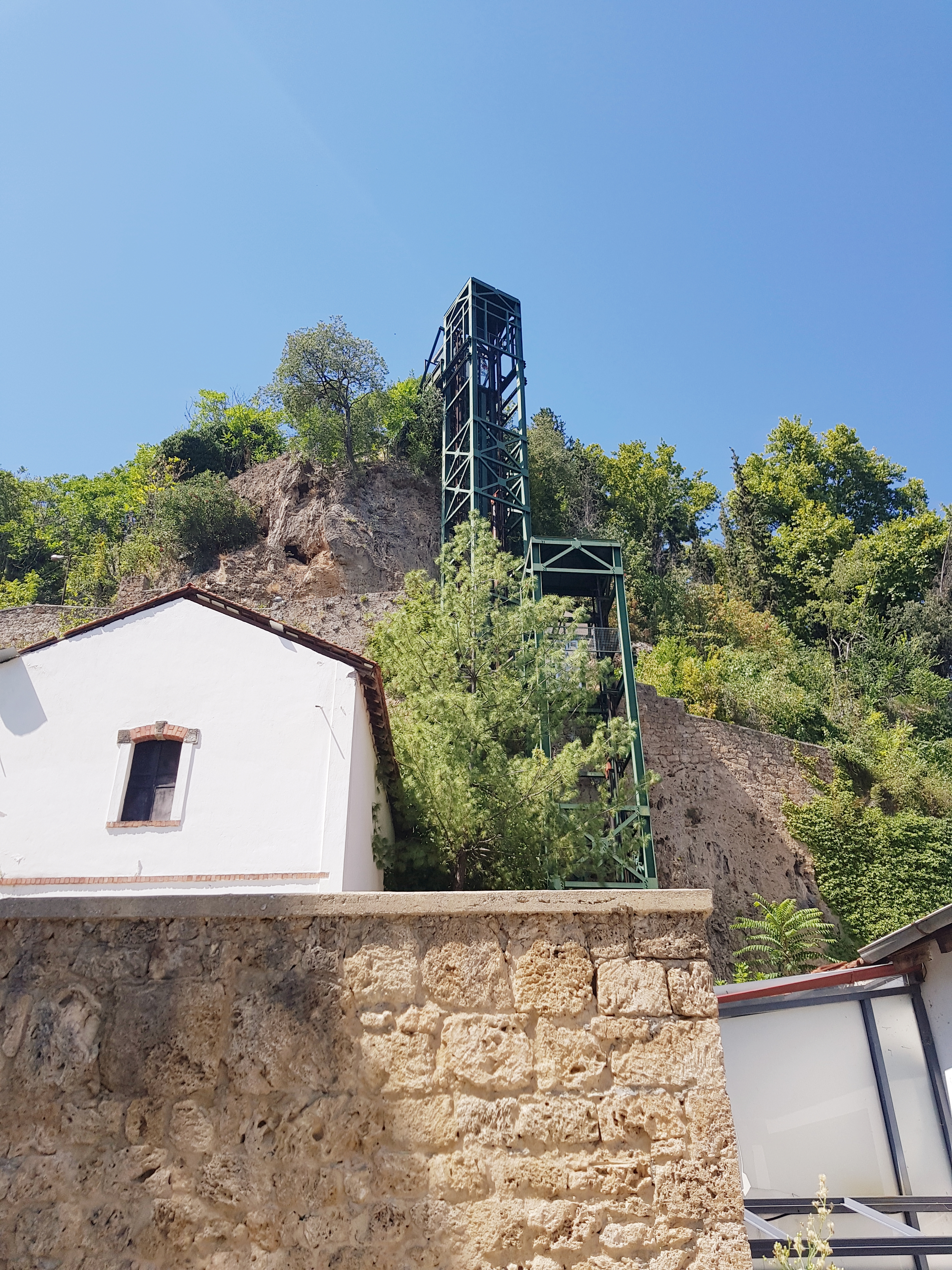
The outdoor elevators as seen from the level of the main building.

=== Pre-existing Infrastructures ===
- Two-storey building for packaging and shipping the product.
- The storage building of the raw material.
- Station of water course for moving the engines.
- Single-story building of the product.
- The building of the machine shop and the boiler room.
- Two outposts (one at the entrance to the factory and the other on the north side).
- Two-storey building with offices and sanitary facilities.

=== Subsequent Infrastructures (Renovation of 1997) ===
- 2 Outdoor Lifts (from the top of the clif behind the complex)
- Path along the cliff
- Recreation Center
- Information Building

== Educational and Entertainment Use ==
=== Start of Operation 1997 ===
At the end of 1990, after 40 years of abandonment, the complex was partially renovated by the municipality of Edessa where in 1997 a restaurant and leisure center served by a double lift along the cliff was constructed. Later, the Hemp Factory became part of the "Mill Rehabilitation Program" for the complete upgrading and refurbishment of the surrounding area.

The program included:

- Remodeling of the Industrial complex
- Reconstruction of old Machine site and Shelters
- Establishment of Industrial Museum.
- Construction of 2 outdoor lifts to facilitate access
- Construction of sites for recreational and cultural use.

Upon completion of the rehabilitation, the site is re-opened as a Culture and Event site, focusing on highlighting the history of the factory. It has also been incorporated as a new section of the Edessa Water Museum.

=== Shut down in 2014-today ===
After 17 years of continuous operation the center closes and the complex is deserted. The cost of reopening is high as debt and maintenance costs are high. Lifts have been deactivated since the end of 2013 to cut spending, which has subsequently proved to be fatal as it has reduced tourist traffic even further. There was an attempt to reopen in 2015 but unfortunately it did not favor. The complex was finally closed in December 2014 and its new owner is the Municipality of Edessa. Unfortunately, the site was not properly guarded and suffered huge damage.

=== New Hemp Factory ===
The "New hemp factory" is the definition that refers to the complete reconstruction of the complex and the official establishment of the Edessa Industrial Museum. At the end of June 2018, the Hemp Factory and the surrounding area were integrated with the resources of the C.A.D.F. (Corporate Agreement for the Development Framework), so that it can be reopened and used as an event hall, while at the same time there will be an Industrial Museum where its equipment will be demonstrably functioning. There will also be a recreation area and a complete remodeling of the lifts and the surrounding buildings for the benefit of culture.
