= Folklore Museum of Edessa =

- Λαογραφικό Μουσείο Έδεσσας
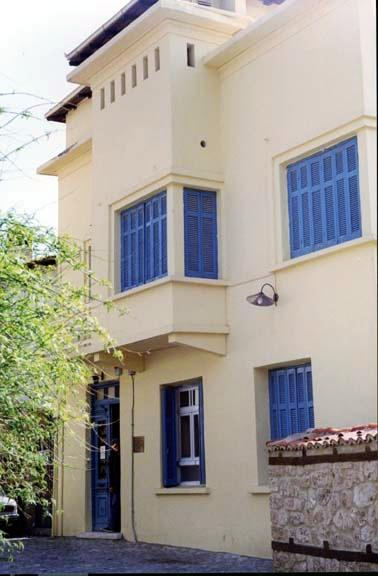
- Outside view
- Established: September 1998
- Location: Edessa, Greece
- Coordinates: 40.8008732°N 22.0510996°E
- Type: History museum
- Founder: Alexander the Great Association of Edessa
- Owner: Municipality of Edessa
- Website: www.edessacity.gr/museum/folkloremuseum/index.htm

The Folklore Museum of Edessa (Greek: Λαογραφικό Μουσείο Έδεσσας) is located in the city of in Edessa in Macedonia, Greece. It was founded twenty years ago on the initiative of the local Alexander the Great Association. It has recently passed into the hands of the Municipality of Edessa.

Following an anthropological and ethnographical study carried out by Prof. Nora Skouteri of the Aristotle University of Thessaloniki, the museum was re-organised and opened its doors to the public again in September 1998 in a new two-storey building at 10 Megalou Alexandrou Street, donated for the purpose by the Sivenas family (Costas & Tana Sivenas).

== Exhibits ==
The museum owns and displays permanent collections of artefacts of the folk culture of the Edessa area. On the ground floor, visitors may see artefacts, implements, and photographs relating to agriculture, stockbreeding, weaving (a very impressive entire loom), sericulture, and candlemaking. (Sericulture and the silk industry were highly developed in Edessa until the 1960s.) On the first floor are local costumes, as worn by townspeople and, mainly, by rural folk from the local mountain villages. The exhibits on the second floor illustrate the lifecycle of the local people, from birth through marriage to death.

The museum also intends to hold temporary exhibitions on specific themes.

== Gallery ==
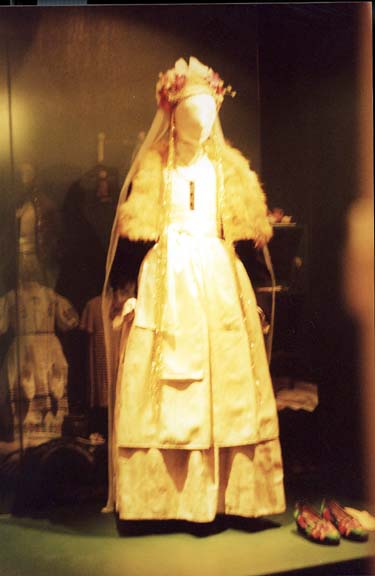
Wedding dress

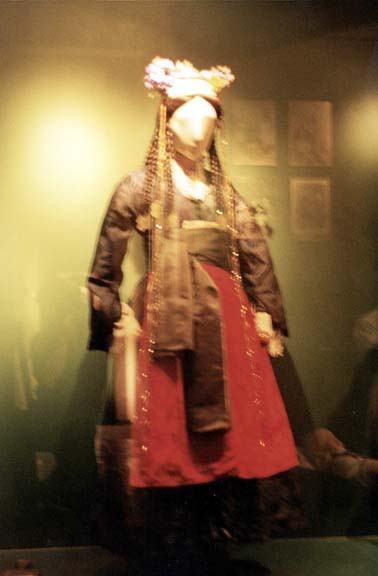
Traditional costume
