= Edessa Waterfalls =

Waterfall in Greece

Edessa Waterfalls Καταρράκτες της Έδεσσας
- Waterfalls of Edessa
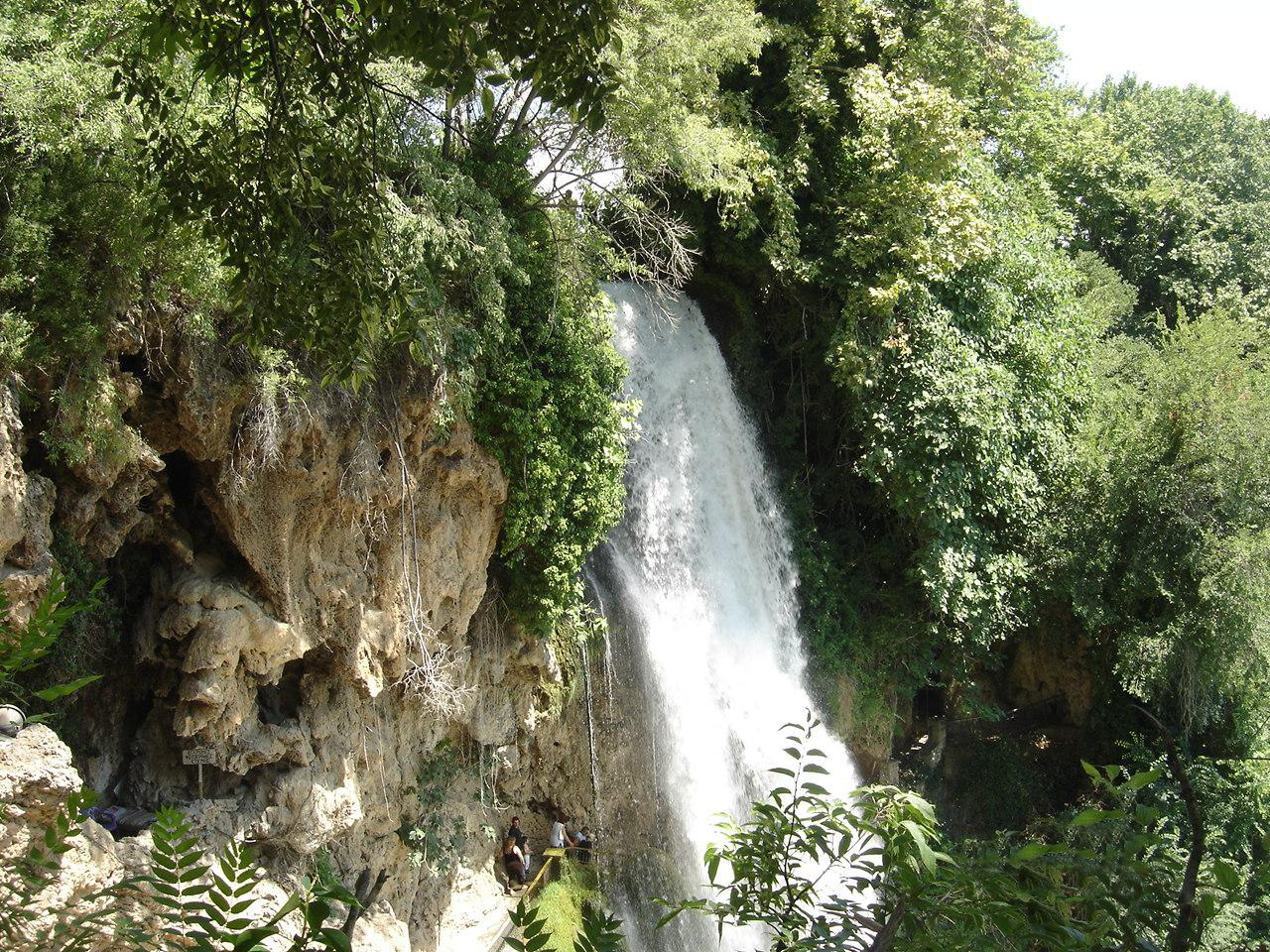
- Waterfall in Edessa, Macedonia, Greece
- Coordinates: 40.8037112596617°N 22.05557942390442°E

Area
  - Total: 01 km^{2} (0.39 sq mi)

Dimensions
  - Length: 1.1 km (0.68 mi)
- Website: http://www.edessacity.gr/tourism/ed800-01_en.htm

The Edessa Waterfalls or Edessis Waterfalls (Greek: Καταρράκτες της Έδεσσας) are located in Edessa city in Macedonia, Greece. The falls are a natural phenomenon that arose after a strong earthquake that struck the surrounding area in the 14th century. Since then, many changes have taken place in their morphology due to earthquakes of smaller scale.

The main source of these waterfalls is the wetland of Agra-Nissiou, from which flows the main river, Edessaios. Edessaios branches are the waterfalls. Furthermore, the Geopark of the Falls spreads over an area of over 100,000sqm and on a path on the rock for 1.1 km.

The waterfalls are the main attraction of visitors to Edessa. There are twelve waterfalls in the area, of which four are easily visible.

The paths of the Waterfall Park include the stone-paved path to Ancient Edessa through the plain of the city. This passage was a part of the ancient Egnatia road linking Ancient Edessa, the Acropolis of Edessa (Varosi district) and Thessaloniki until the beginning of the 20th century.

== History ==
=== Formation ===
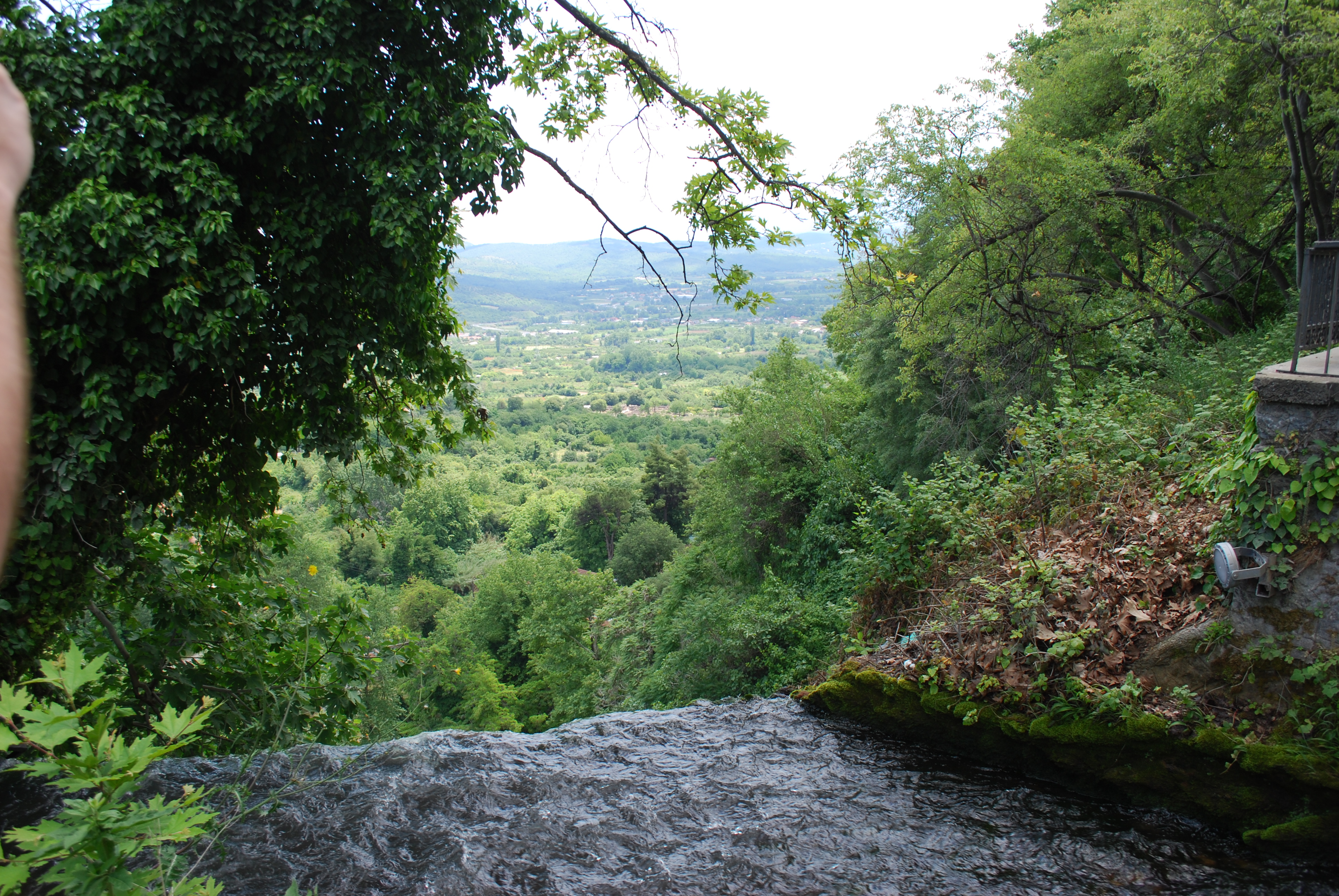
Waterfalls of Edessa in Greece

The waterfalls of Edessa were formed in the 14th century after a geological or weather phenomenon. Initially, the bulk of the water was held in a basin west of the city. Later, the waters began to pass through the city and started falling spectacularly from the high rocks resulting in the creation of many small rivers and waterfalls.

=== Industrial exploitation ===
At the end of the 19th century several factories were built on the rock of the city as waterfalls could be used to produce electricity without cost. Altogether, five large textile factories and several labs and tanneries were erected. Each factory used a waterfall to achieve production and create an autonomous electricity system.

=== Tourism ===
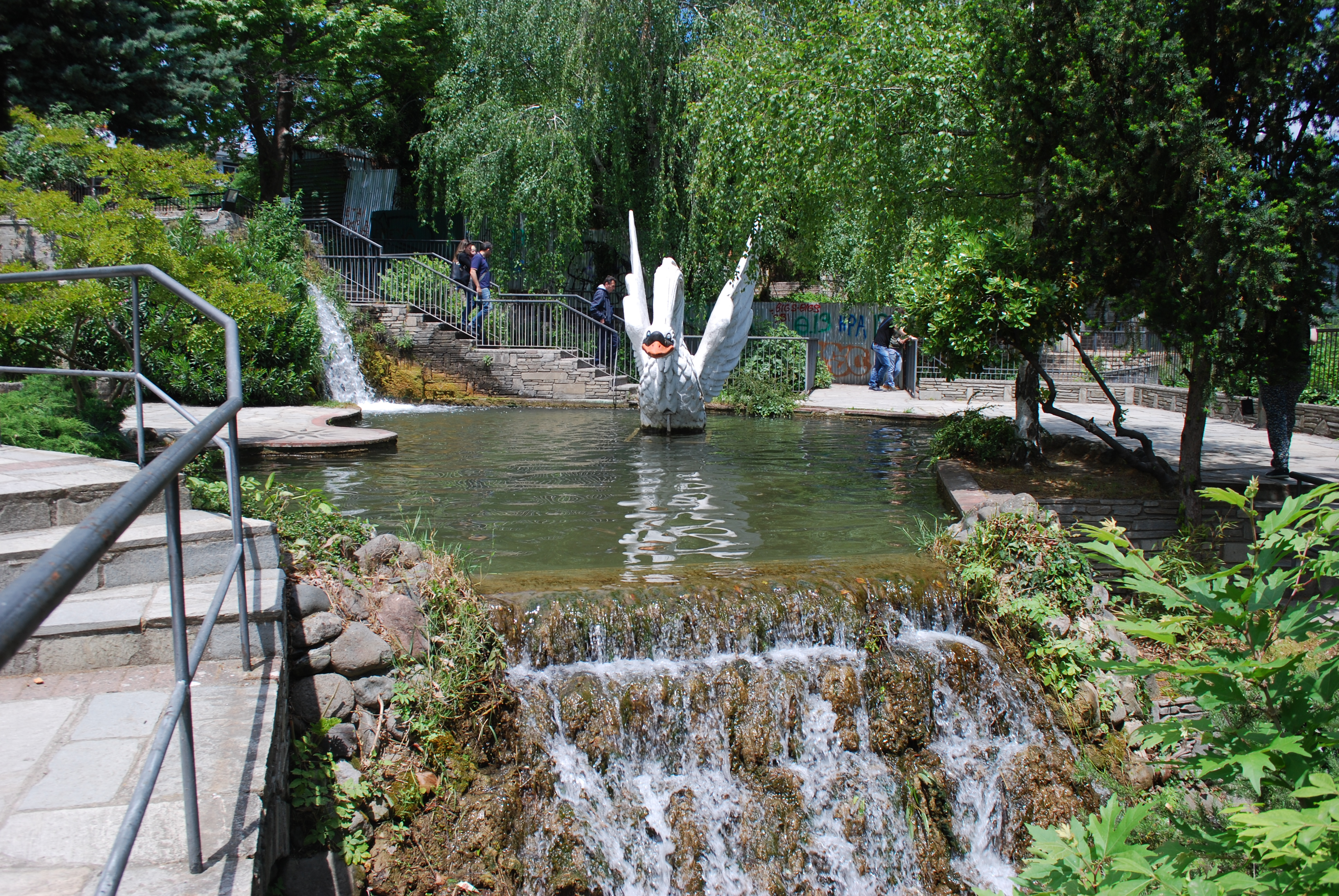
Tourists can drink their coffee inside the waterfalls

After World War II and the re-establishment of the municipality of Edessa, the waterfall area passed into the hands of the state. The Municipality recruited collaborators and gardeners to redevelop and highlight the area, and large gardens and paths were constructed. The works were completed in 1953. A municipal restaurant called "POINTS" was set up on the islet between the two big waterfalls. In 1960s, paths and signs were constructed to allow the visitor to approach safely.

Since 2003, the waterfalls are illuminated in the rainbow colors during the night.

== See also ==
- List of waterfalls
