= Edessa Ecclesiastical Museum =

- Εκκλησιαστικό Μουσείο Έδεσσας
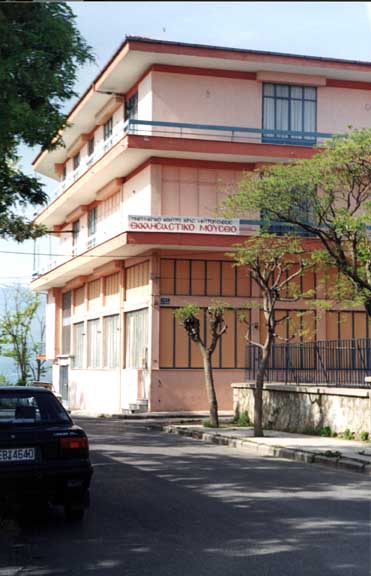
- Outside view
- Established: 1996
- Location: Edessa, Greece
- Coordinates: 40.7992781°N 22.0524986°E
- Type: Art museum
- Founders: Diocese of Edessa, Pella, and Almopia

The Edessa Ecclesiastical Museum (Greek: Εκκλησιαστικό Μουσείο Έδεσσας) was founded in the northern Greek city of Edessa in 1996, by the local Diocese of Edessa, Pella, and Almopia. The museum is located on the outskirts of the district of Varosi and adjacent to Kokkinos Vrahos. It occupies the second floor of a three-storey building owned by the Diocese at 23 Megalou Alexandrou Street.

== Exhibits ==
The most important exhibits are ecclesiastical, but there are also mementoes of the Greeks' liberation struggles, of resistance to external foes, and of the fostering of the Christian faith.

Exhibits include altar doors from old churches in the Pella prefecture, post-Byzantine icons of the Panagia, the crucified Christ, and saints, oil lamps and candelabra, chalices, ecclesiastical vessels, icons from chancel screens, epitaphii (most notable among which is the Russian epitaphios from the church of Aridaia, which dates from the time of the tsars), the vestments of the last three metropolitans of Edessa, Pella, and Almopia, rare ecclesiastical books, and numerous photographs of the various activities carried out within the diocese.

There are also portraits and uniforms of men who took part in the Macedonian Struggle in the 1900s, traditional women's costumes, an Italian weapon that is a trophy of the Greco-Italian War of 1940, and the front page of the Makedonia newspaper describing the victories of the Greek army on the Albanian front during that war.

== Gallery ==
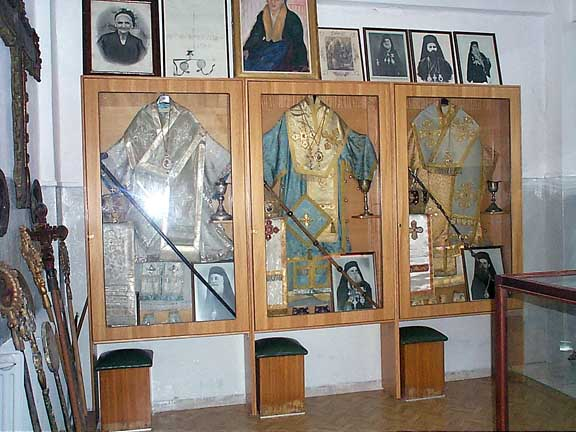
The Vestments of the last three Metropolitans

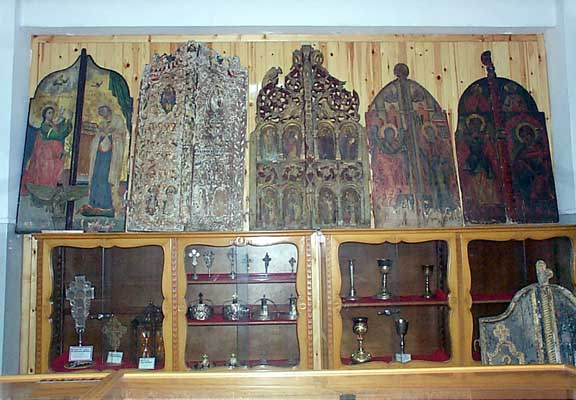
Bema doors

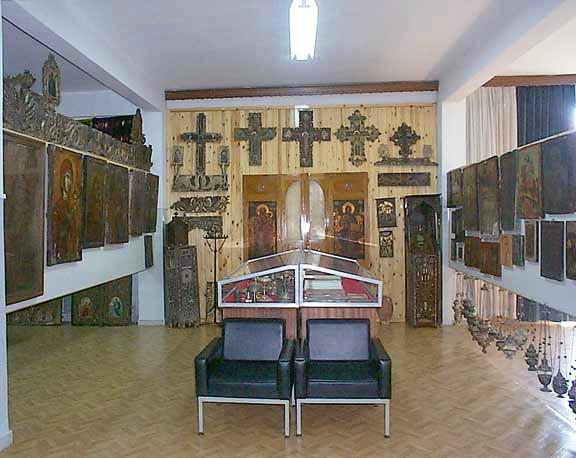
Holy crosses and icons

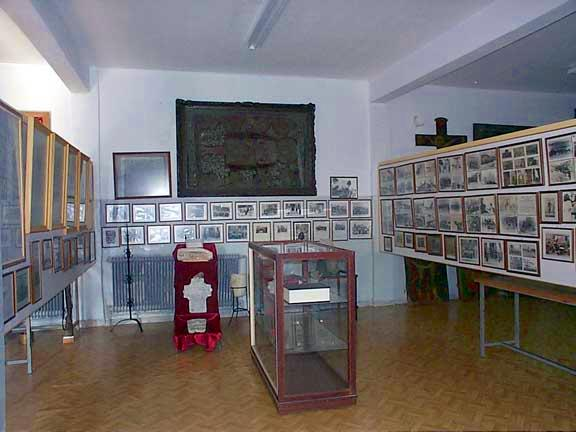
Photos of the activities of the Diocese
