= Edessa, Greece =

City in Macedonia, Greece

Edessa Έδεσσα
- Municipality
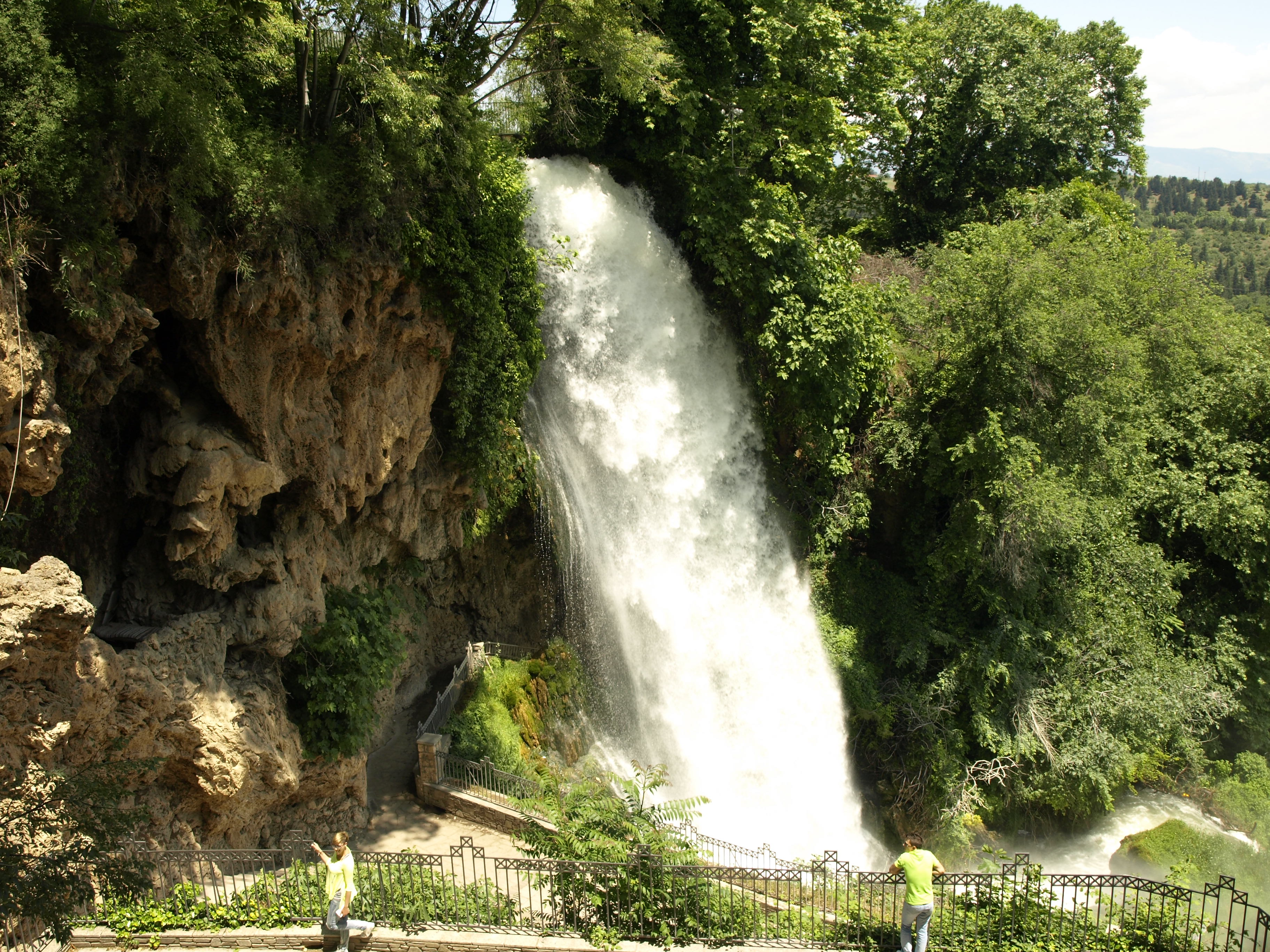
- Edessa's waterfalls, landmark of the town

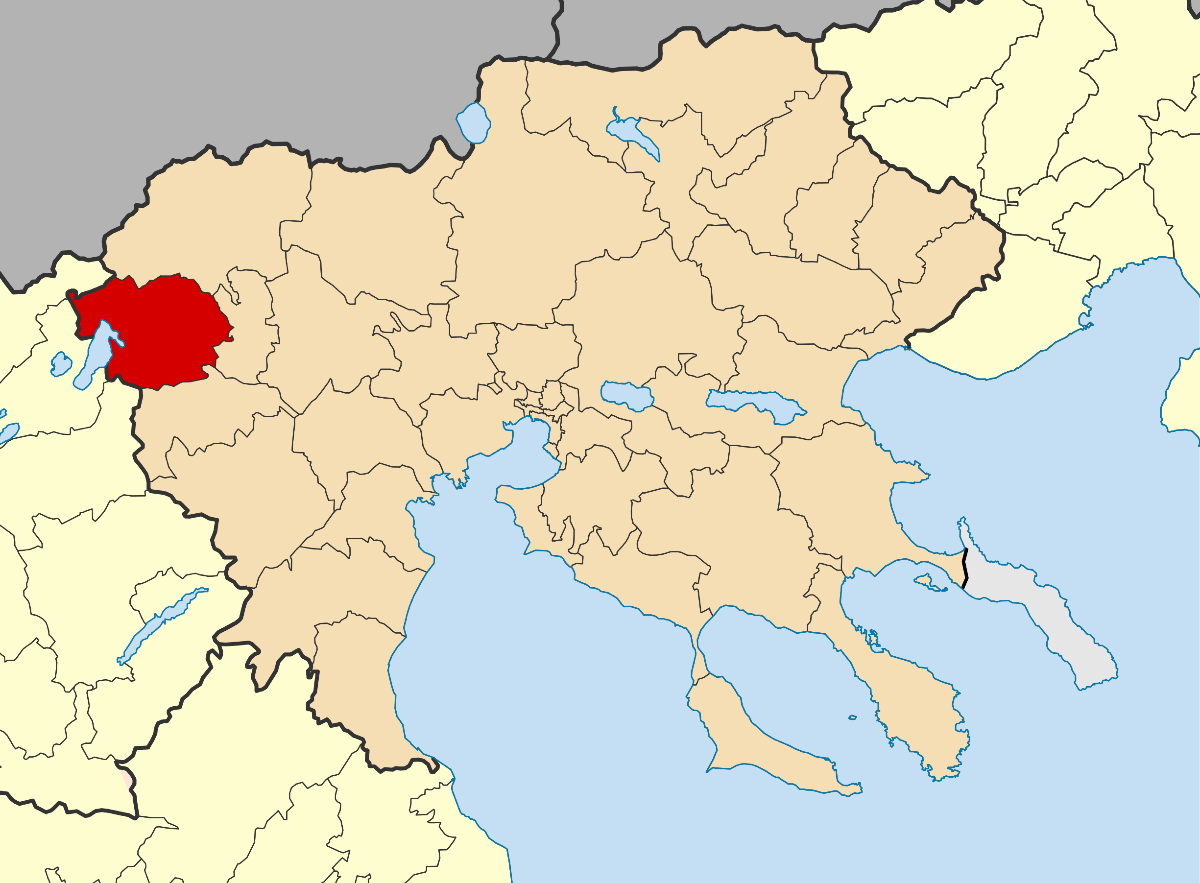
- The location of the Municipality of Edessa

- Location within Greece
- Coordinates: 40°48′N 22°3′E
- Country: Greece
- Geographic region: Macedonia
- Administrative region: Central Macedonia
- Regional unit: Pella
- Districts: 15

Government
  - Mayor: Ioannis Tsepkentzis (since 2023)

Area
  - Municipality: 611.212 km^{2} (235.990 sq mi)
  - Municipal unit: 321.2 km^{2} (124.0 sq mi)
  - Community: 39.0 km^{2} (15.1 sq mi)
- Elevation: 320 m (1,050 ft)

Population (2021)
  - Municipality: 26,407
  - Density: 43.204/km^{2} (111.90/sq mi)
  - Municipal unit: 23,210
  - Municipal unit density: 72.26/km^{2} (187.2/sq mi)
  - Community: 19,036
  - Community density: 488/km^{2} (1,260/sq mi)
- Time zone: UTC+2 (EET)
  - Summer (DST): UTC+3 (EEST)
- Postal code: 582 00
- Area code: 23810
- Vehicle registration: ΕΕ
- Website: dimosedessas.gov.gr

Edessa (Greek: Έδεσσα, pronounced [ˈeðesa]), known until 1923 as Vodena (Greek: Βοδενά), is a city in Northern Greece and the capital of the Pella regional unit in the region of Central Macedonia. It was also the capital of the defunct province of the same name.

Edessa holds a special place in the history of the Greek world as, according to some ancient sources, it was here that Caranus established the first capital of ancient Macedon. Later, under the Byzantine Empire, Edessa benefited from its strategic location, controlling the Via Egnatia as it enters the Pindus mountains, and became a center of medieval Greek culture, famed for its strong walls and fortifications. In the modern period, Edessa was one of Greece's industrial centers until the middle of the 20th century, with many textile factories operating in the city and its immediate vicinity. Today however its economy mainly relies on services and tourism. Edessa hosts most of the administrative services of the Pella regional unit, as well as some departments of the Thessaloniki-based University of Macedonia.

== Name ==
The Greek name Ἔδεσσα (Édessa) means "tower in the water" and is generally thought to be of Phrygian origin, although a minority of scholars consider it to be Illyrian instead. The Slavic name Vodĭnŭ (Водьнъ) commonly held to derive from the Slavic word for "water" was first attested in the 10th century, and became the common name until the 20th century.

Vodená (Βοδενά) was the name used in Greek until 1923, when the ancient name was revived. The Bulgarian and Macedonian name remains Voden (Cyrillic: Воден). In Turkish, the city is known as Vodina, and in Aromanian the city is known as either Edessa, Vudena or Vodina.

Seleucus I Nicator named the city of Edessa in Mesopotamia (modern Şanlıurfa, Turkey) after the Macedonian Edessa.

== Municipality ==
The municipality Edessa was formed at the 2011 local government reform by the merger of the following 2 former municipalities, that became municipal units:

- Edessa
- Vegoritida

The municipality has an area of 611.212 km^{2}, the municipal unit 321.225 km^{2}.

== History ==
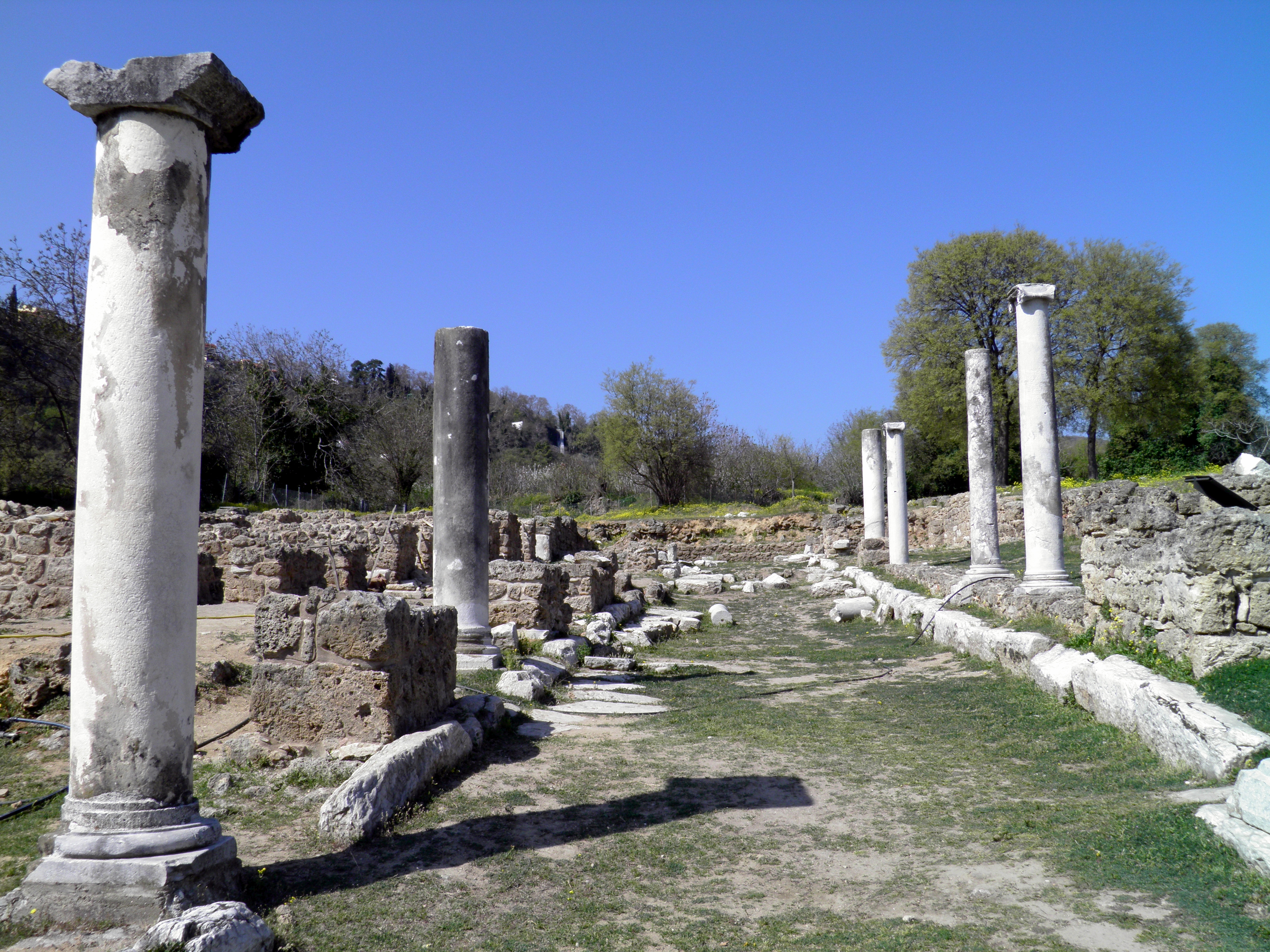
Street of ancient Edessa.

According to some ancient writers, Caranus, the legendary founder of the Argead Dynasty (whose most famous member was Alexander the Great), established the city of Edessa and made it the first capital of ancient Macedon, and later Argead rulers moved Macedon's capital to Aegae and eventually Pella. Archaeological remains have been discovered on the site of ancient Edessa, just below the modern city (40°47'48.48"N 22° 3'26.24"E). The walls and many buildings have been unearthed so far. A colonnade with inscription in Greek dates from Roman times. The city achieved certain prominence in the first centuries AD, being located on the Via Egnatia. From 27 BC to 268 AD it had its own mint. The Orthodox Christian Saint Vassa and her three children were put to death here in the 3rd century AD.

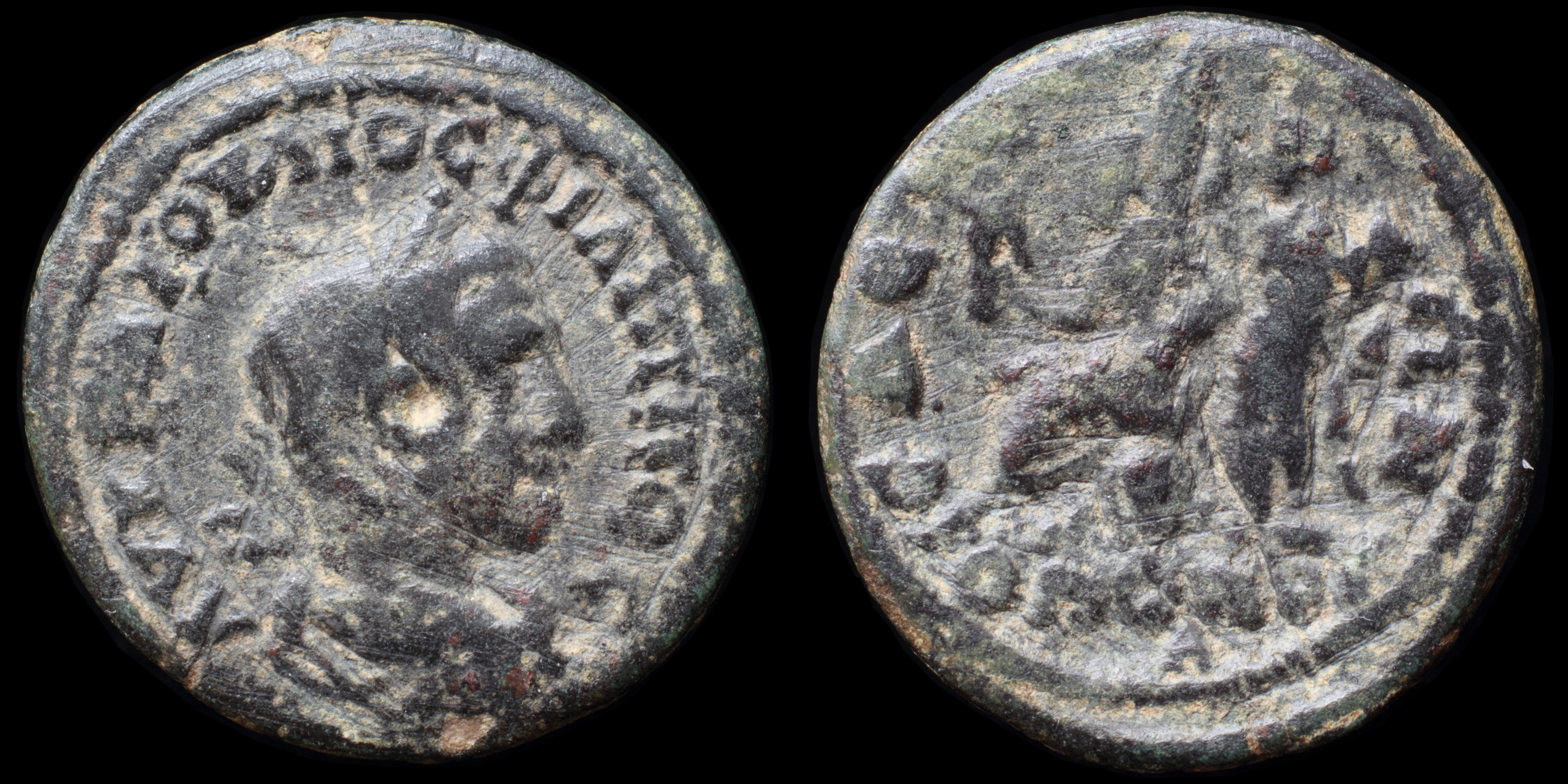

First side of the image: O: laureate draped and cuirassed bust AV K MA ΙΟΥΛΙΟϹ ΦΙΛΙΠΠΟϹ
Second side of the image: R: Roma seated on shield holding Nike with wreath and palm and parazonium is crowned with a wreath by Tyche holding cornucopia standing behind ΕΔΕϹϹΑΙΩΝ / ΟΜΟΝΟΙ / Α
bronze coin struck by Philip the Arab in Edessa 244-249 AD; ref.: Moushmov 6277 Plate XLIV 21

Little is known about the fate of the city after 500 AD, but we know that its Greek bishop, Isidoros, participated in the Ecumenical Council of 692.

The city disappears from the sources thereafter, and re-emerges only in the 11th century, in the account of the Bulgarian wars of Emperor Basil II by the chronicler John Skylitzes, with the Slavic name Vodena (τὰ Βοδηνά in Greek). The Bulgarian historian Vasil Zlatarski hypothesized that it was Vodena, and not Vidin on the Danube, that was a base of the Cometopuli in their revolt against Byzantium.

Due to its strategic location, controlling the Via Egnatia as it enters the Pindus mountains, the town was much fought over in the subsequent centuries: the Normans under Bohemond I captured it briefly in 1083, but were eventually repelled by the forces of Emperor Alexios I Komnenos. The Nicaean emperor John III Vatatzes captured in 1253, while in the mid-14th century its possession was disputed between the Byzantines and the Serbs under Stephen Dushan, with the latter securing its possession in January 1351. The city was for some time under control of Radoslav Hlapen, who gave it as dowry to his son-in-law Nikola Bagaš probably around 1366/7. The city remained in Bagaš's hands at least until 1385. It was conquered by the Ottoman commander Evrenos Bey in the late 14th century, along with the rest of Macedonia. In 1519 (Hijri 925) the town had 68 Muslim and 116 Christian households; it was a joint zeamet of Murad of İpek, and Hüseyin the son of dizdar.

During the period of Ottoman rule, the Turkish and Muslim component of the town's population steadily increased. From the 1860s onwards, the town was a flashpoint for clashes between Greeks and Bulgarians. According to the Ottoman general census of 1881/1882–1893, the district of Edessa (Vodine) had a total population of 33,113, consisting of 14,962 Muslims, 14,208 Greek Patriarchists, and 3,943 Bulgarian Exarchists.

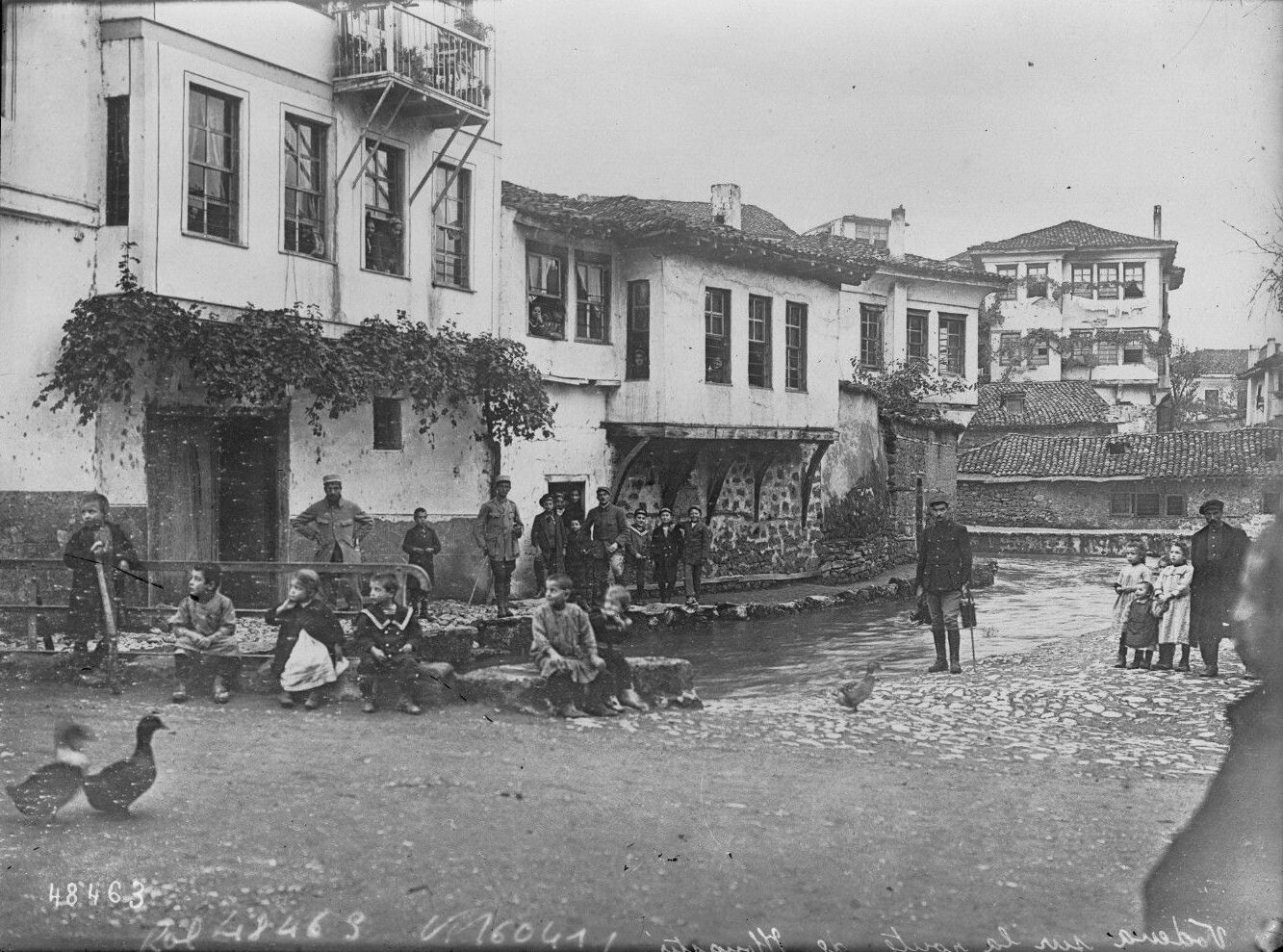
View of Vodena, nowadays Edessa, in 1916.

After almost 500 years of Ottoman rule, Edessa was annexed by Greece on 18 October 1912 during the First Balkan War, following the Hellenic Army's military victory against the Ottomans in the battle of Sarantaporo. At that time, Edessa was already well on its way to becoming a major industrial center in Macedonia. Four large textile factories with the Hemp Factory being the biggest, employing the abundant waterfalls as a source of energy. Prior to World War I, in addition to Greeks, the region of Edessa was also populated by Turks, Bulgarians, Pomaks and Vlachs, but during the population exchange between Greece and Turkey most of the Turks and Pomaks living in Edessa were transferred to Turkey. Large numbers of Greek refugees from Asia Minor were settled in the area in 1923. The population swelled from 9,441 to 13,115 in the 1920s. A large segment of the population specialized in silk production, allowing Edessa to enjoy a high standard of living in the interwar period (1922–1940).

The town suffered during the last days of German occupation of Greece in 1944. As a retaliation for the shooting of one soldier by resistance fighters, the Nazis set Edessa on fire. Half of the city, including the Cathedral and the First Primary School, was destroyed and thousands of people were left homeless.

During the Greek Civil War (1946-1949) Edessa was twice attacked in 1948 by the Democratic Army of Greece (DSE), under the control of the Communist Party of Greece. The Slavic-Macedonian National Liberation Front (SNOF), later simply the National Liberation Front (NOF) was heavily established in the area, with eleven Slav Macedonian partisan units operating in the mountains around the city. When the NOF merged with the Democratic Army of Greece (DSE), many Slav Macedonians in the region enlisted as volunteers in the DSE. In early 1949, the military forces of the Greek Government conducted a series of successful military operations that destroyed all communist forces and after the end of war in August 1949, many communists and sympathizers, both ethnic Greeks and Slav Macedonians were expelled from Greece and fled to the countries of Eastern Europe.

Since the 1970s Edessa's economy no longer relies on industry. At the beginning of the 21st century, it is a city based on services (mostly linked to its function as capital of the Pella regional unit) and tourism due to the many ancient sights nearby, including ancient Pella, the waterfalls and winter sports.

== The ancient site (Longos) ==
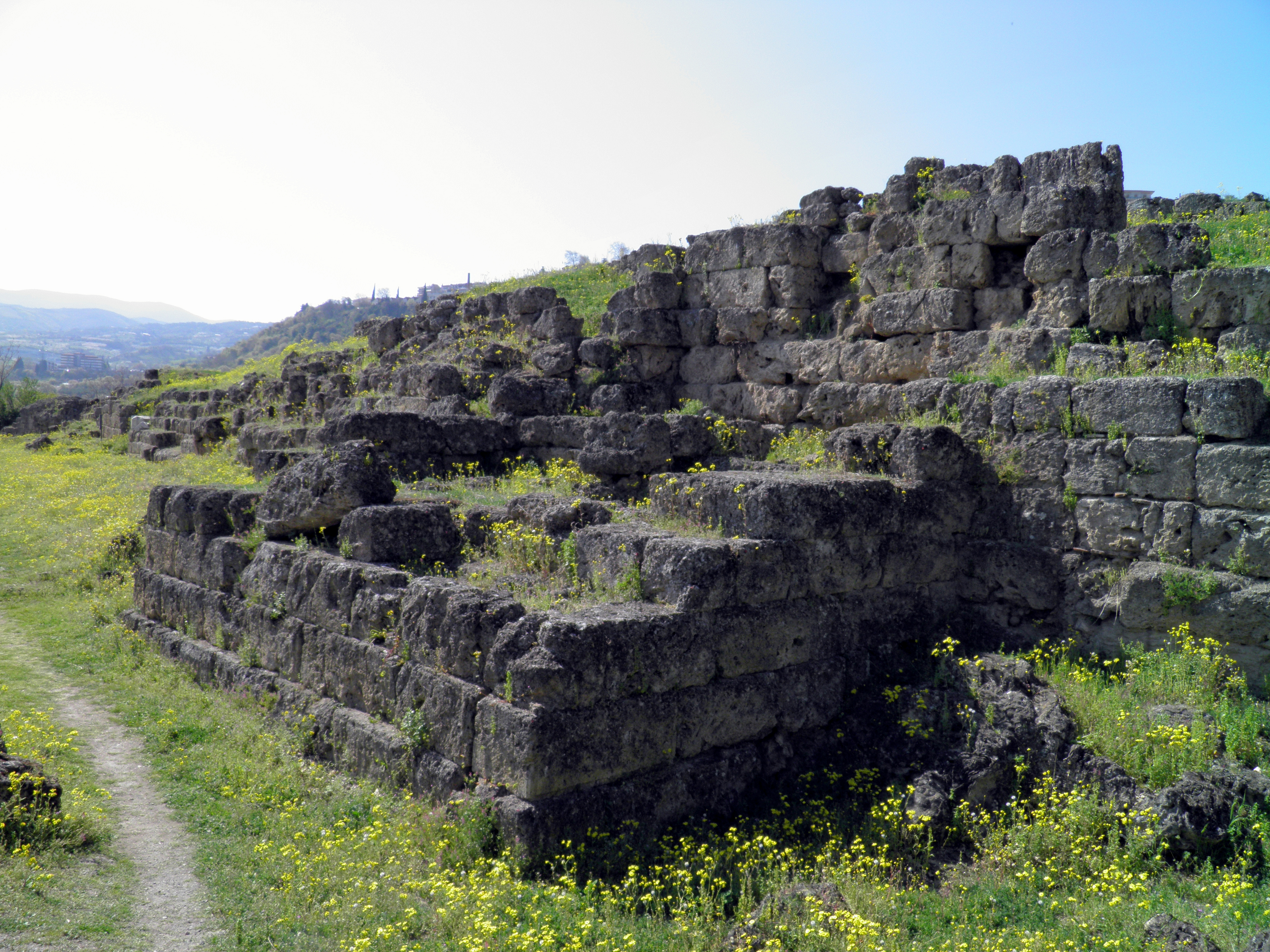
Edessa's Hellenistic Wall

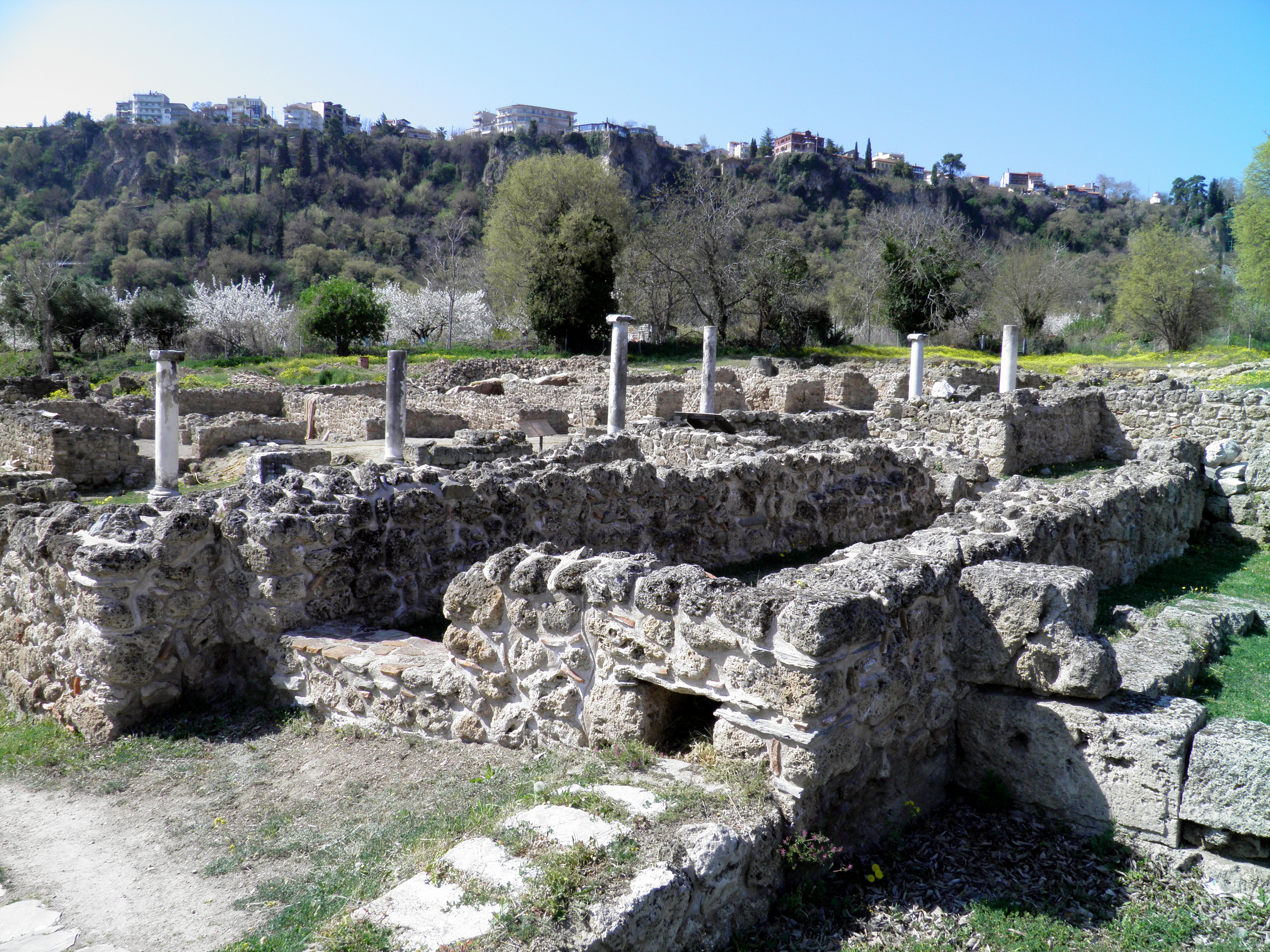
Military lodgings of ancient Edessa

== Demographics ==
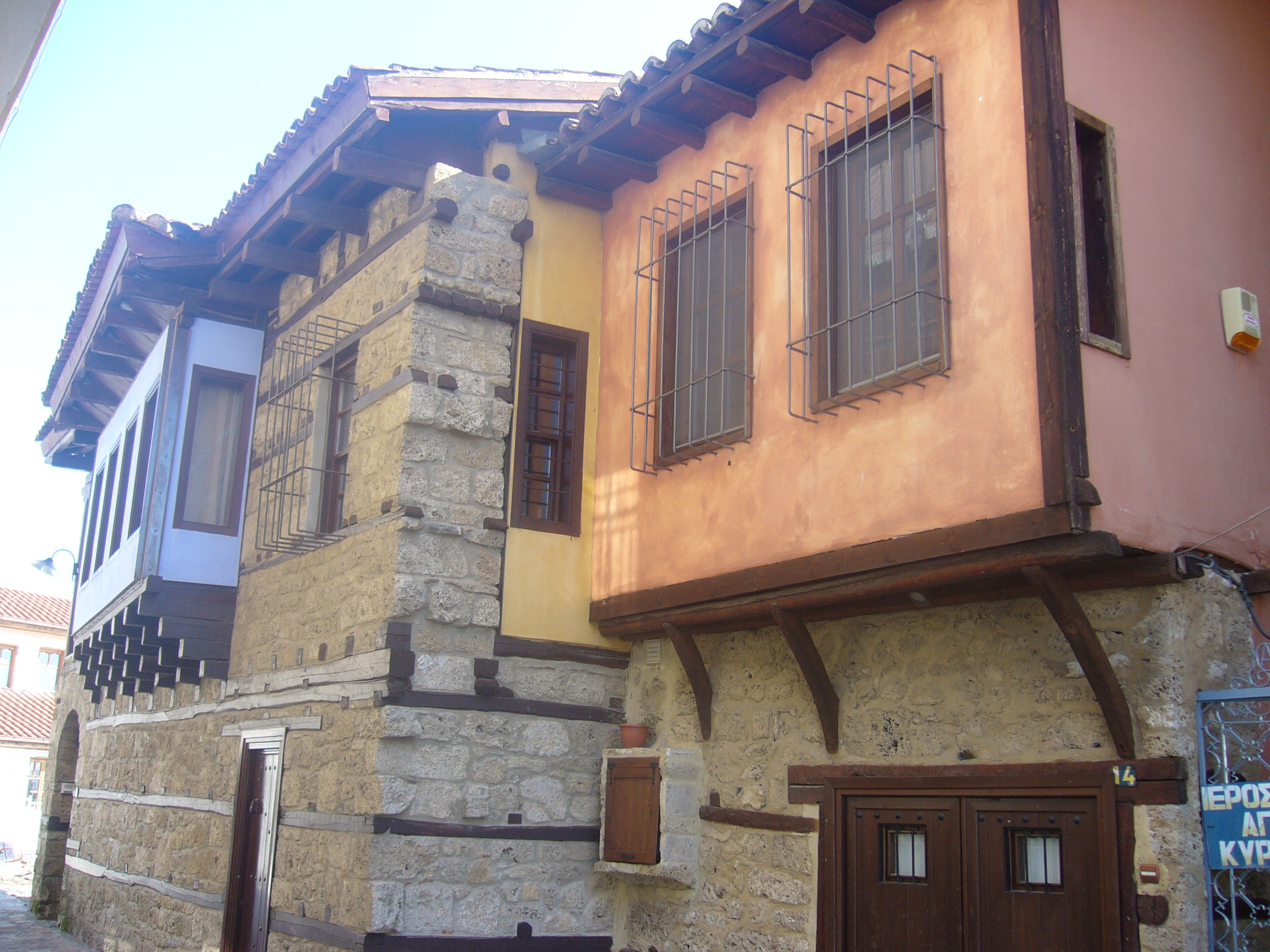
Old street

Historical populations
Year	Town	Municipal unit	Municipality
1913	8,846	-	-
1920	9,441	-	-
1928	13,115	-	-
1940	12,000	-	-
1951	14,940	-	-
1961	15,534	-	-
1971	13,967	-	-
1981	16,642	-	-
1991	17,659	25,051	-
2001	18,253	25,619	-
2011	19,036	25,179	28,814
2021	17,848	23,210	26,407

== Infrastructure ==
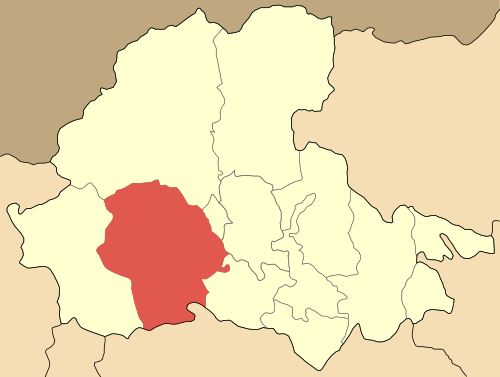
Location of Edessa in its municipal unit.

=== Transportation ===
Vodena (today Edessa) station in 1899

Edessa railway station is located on the Thessaloniki–Bitola railway and is currently served by Line 2 of the Thessaloniki Regional Railway.

=== Media ===
- Pella TV
- Egnatia TV

== Sports ==
Edessa hosts two sport clubs with presence or earlier presence in the higher national divisions in Greek football and handball. These clubs are shown below.

Sport clubs based in Edessa
Club	Founded	Sports	Achievements
Edessaikos F.C.	1960	Football	Earlier presence in A Ethniki
Aeropos Edessas	1978	Handball	Presence in A1 Ethniki handball

== Notable people ==
- Tašo Ajanovski, activist
- Risto Kordalov, partisan
- Grigorie Hadzi Taskovic, revolutionary
- Minas Minoidis (18th century), Greek scholar, figure of the Modern Greek Enlightenment
- Solon Grigoriadis, Greek army officer and journalist
- Georgi Urdov, partisan
- Dimitris Beis, Greek resistance figure against the junta of the Colonels and Mayor of Athens, 1979–1986
- Vane Zaneshev, activist
- Trifun Hadjijanev, communist
- Giorgos Paschalidis, Greek former Minister and close associate of Prime Minister Costas Simitis
- Velko Dumev, revolutionary
- Aggelis Gatsos, Greek fighter in the Greek War of Independence
- Vangel Ajanovski-Oče, secretary of SNOF
- Trifun Buzev, American worker and participant in the Spanish civil war
- Hakkı Yeten, Turkish football player of Beşiktaş J.K.
- Dimitar Zaneshev, revolutionary
- Hadži-Neimar, Serbian architect and chief builder of the autonomous Principality of Serbia
- Markos Meskos, Greek writer and poet
- Georgi Ajanovski, writer
- Marietta Chrousala, Greek fashion model and television presenter

== Twin cities ==
- Gornji Milanovac, Serbia
- Pleven, Bulgaria
- Bitola, North Macedonia

== Gallery ==
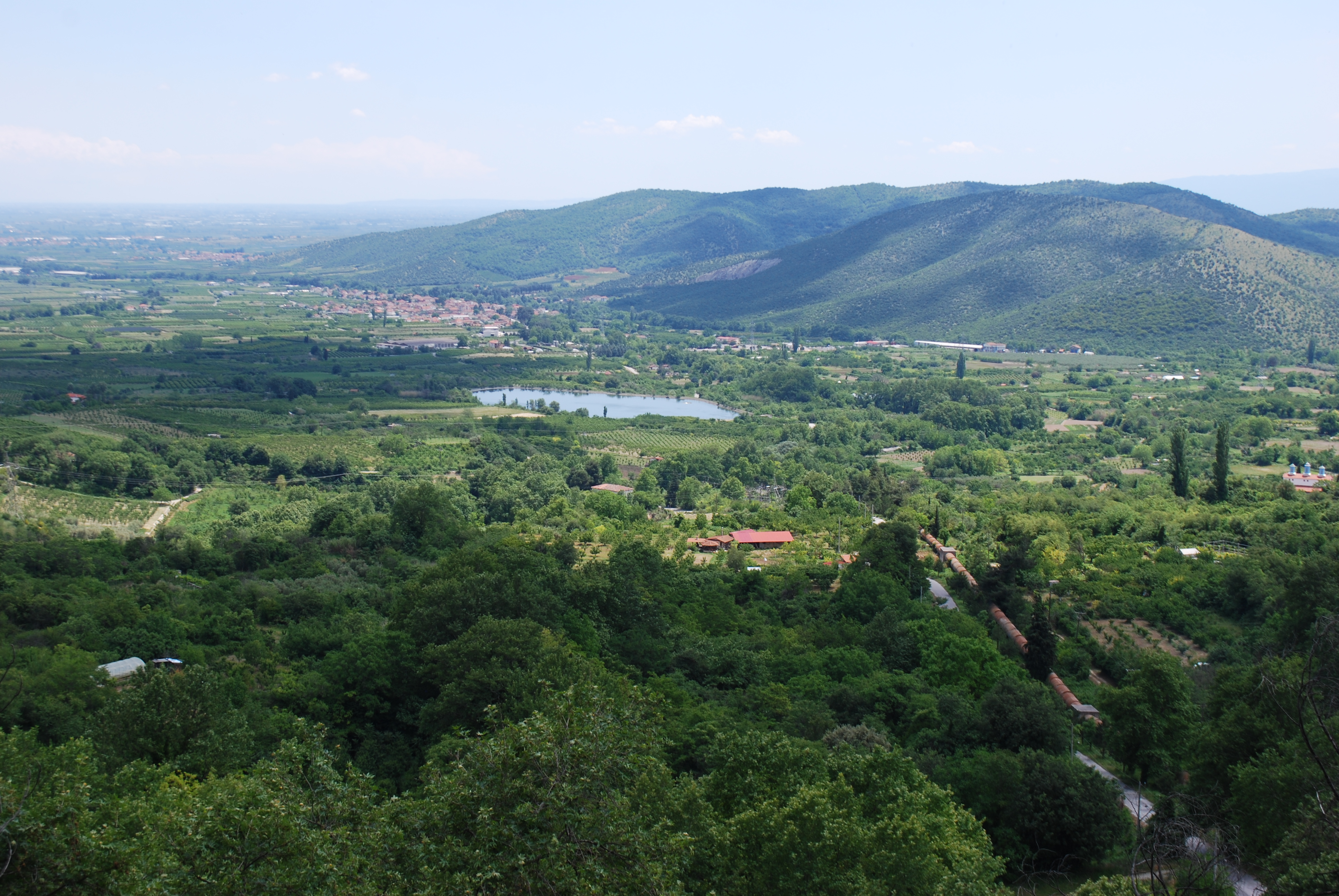
View of the area

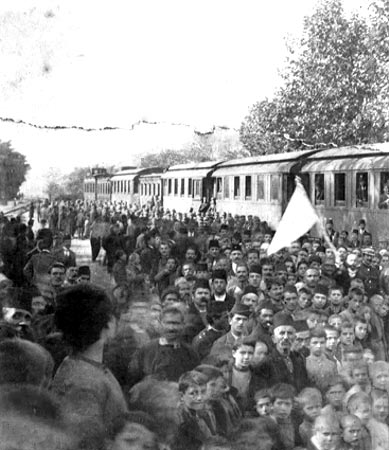
Crowd celebrating the liberation of Edessa (First Balkan War)

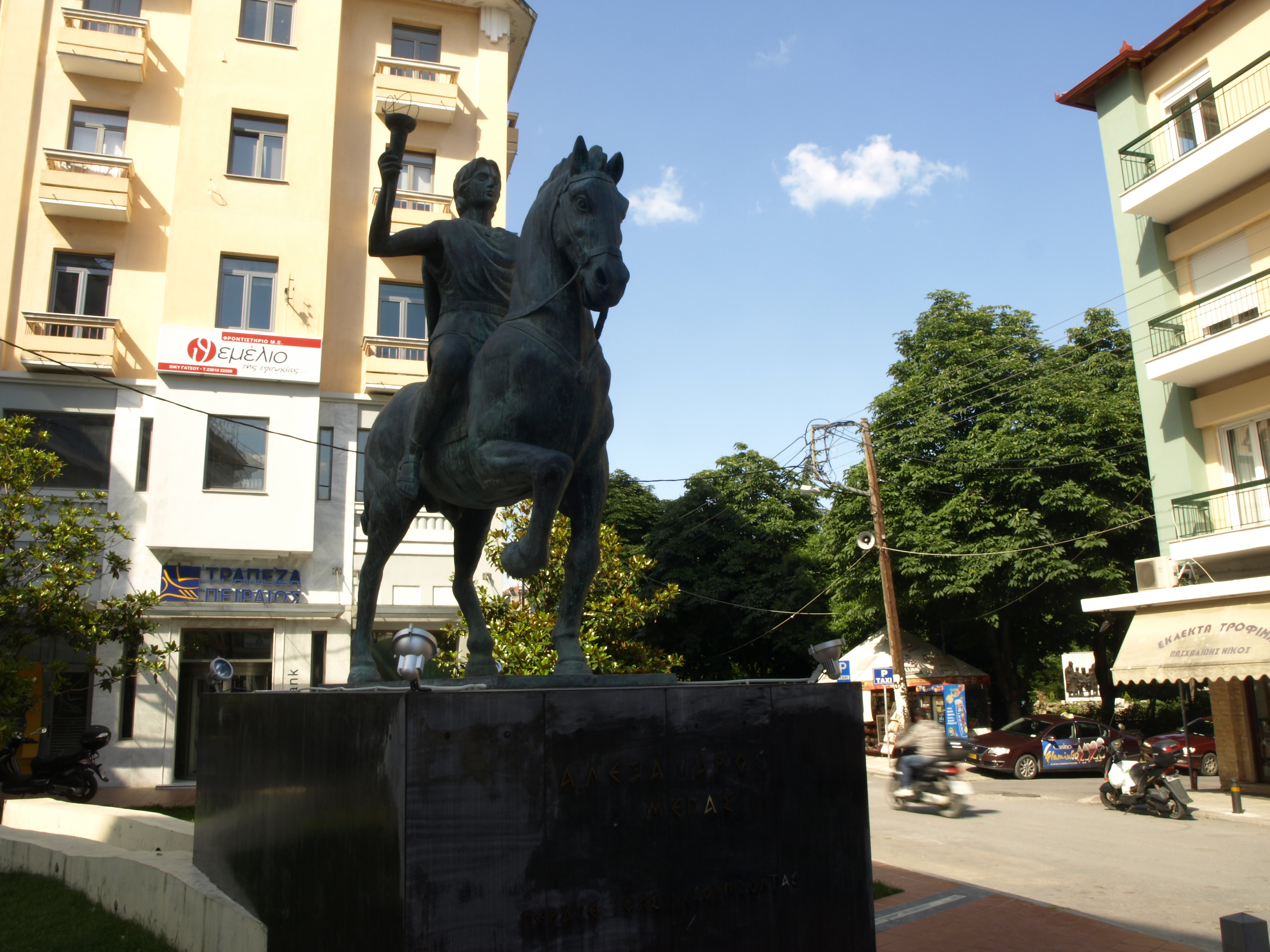
A statue of Alexander the Great

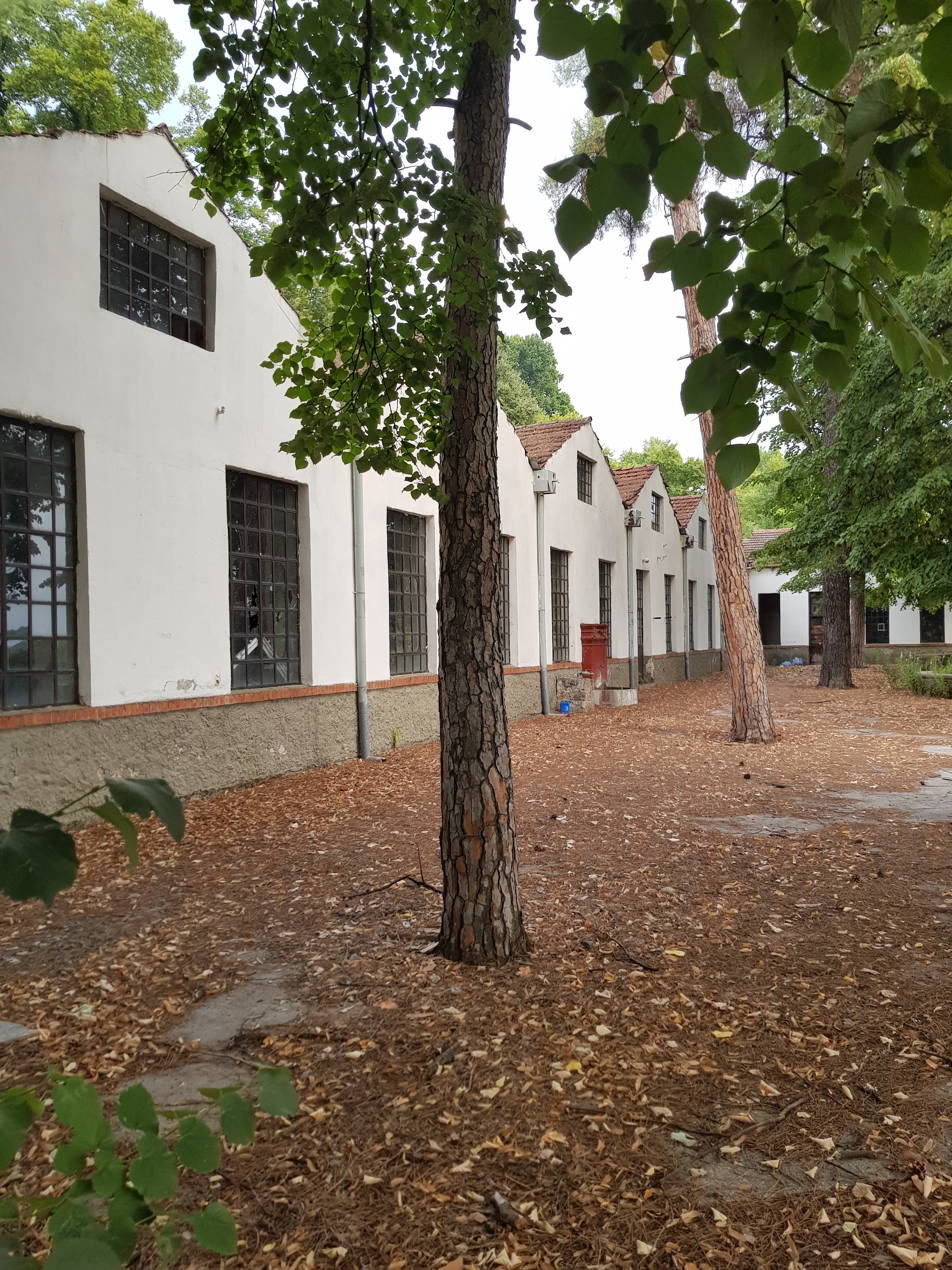
View of the old Kanavourgeio (cannabis factory)

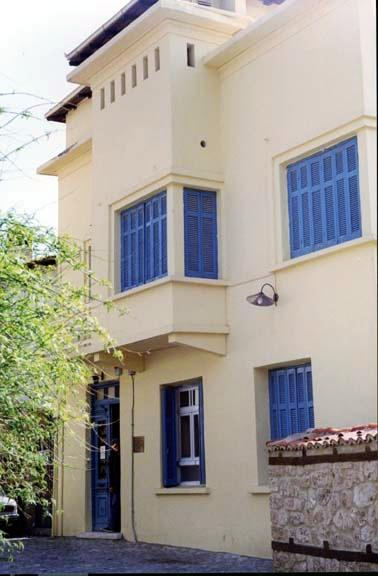
Folklore museum

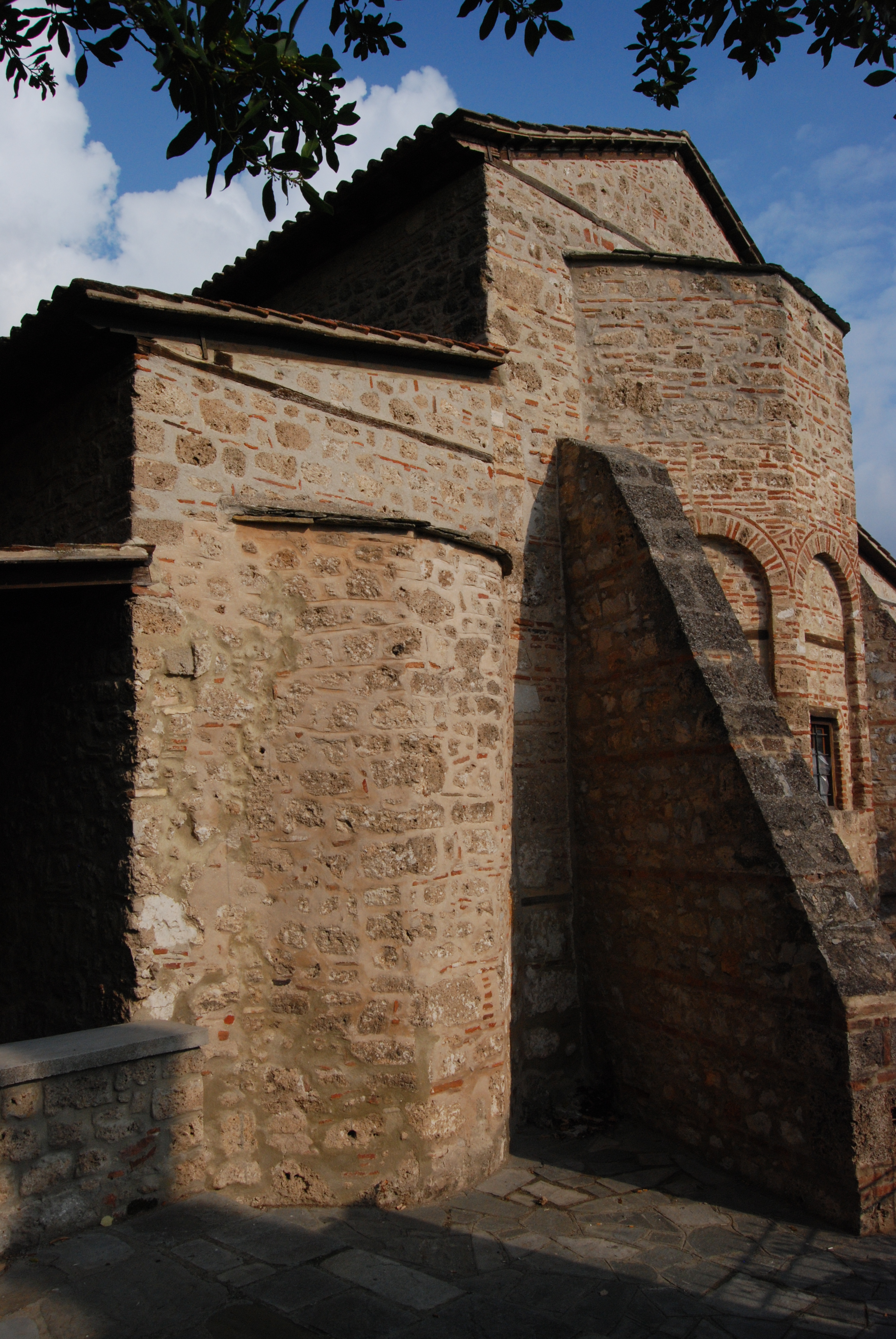
Dormition of Theotokos (14th)

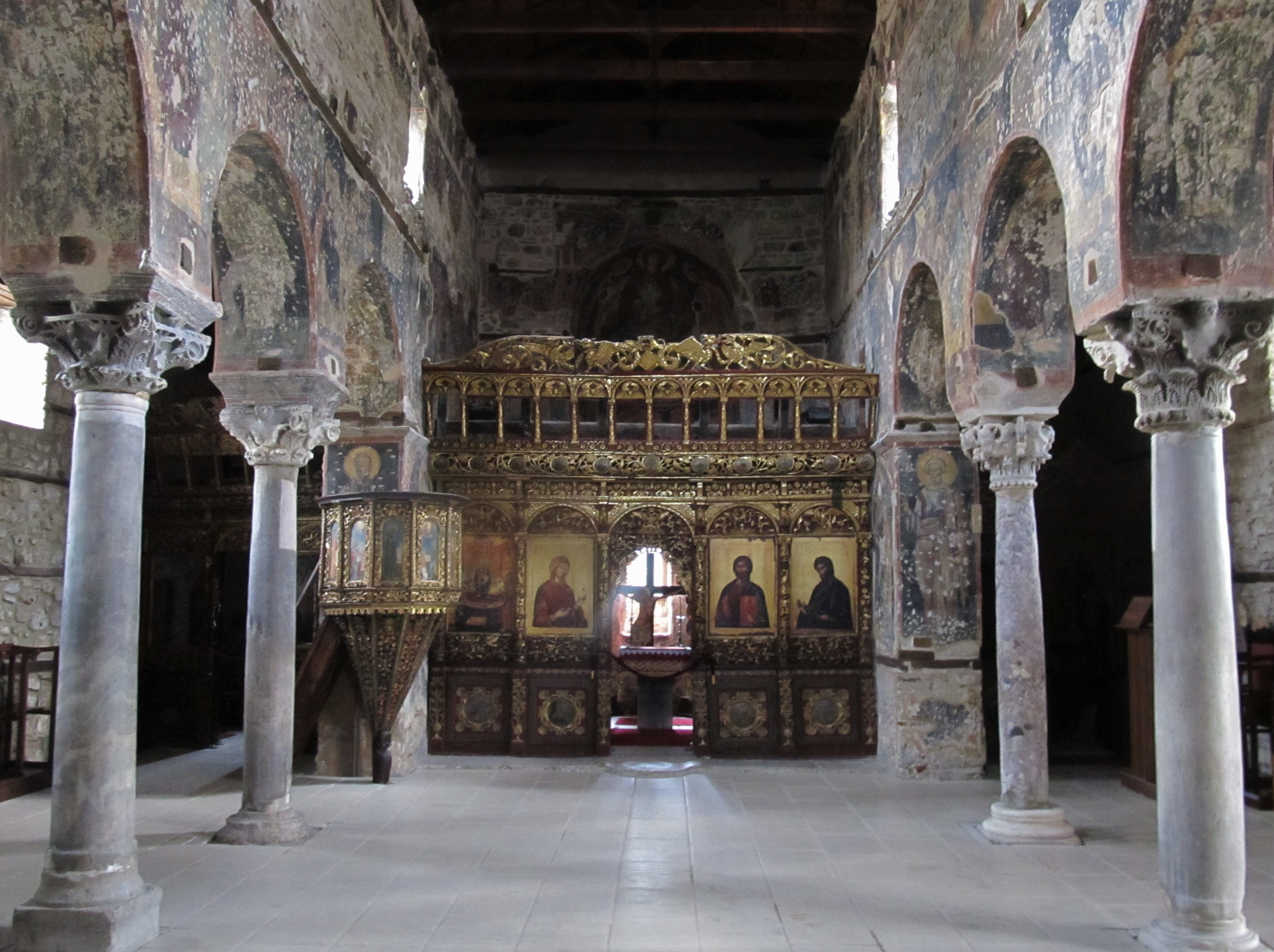
Interior

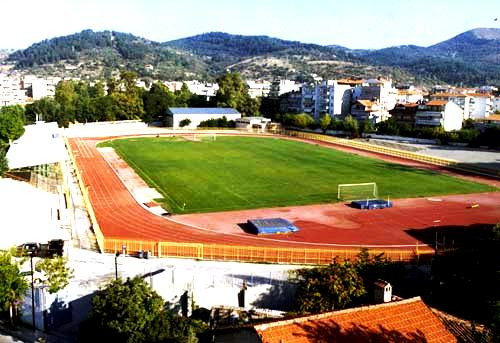
Municipal stadium

== See also ==
- List of settlements in the Pella regional unit
- Edessa Ecclesiastical Museum
- Folklore Museum of Edessa
