= Center for Nanophase Materials Sciences =

Science research center

The Center for Nanophase Materials Sciences is the first of the five Nanoscale Science Research Centers sponsored by the United States Department of Energy. It is located in Oak Ridge, Tennessee and is a collaborative research facility for the synthesis, characterization, theory/ modeling/ simulation, and design of nanoscale materials. It is co-located with Spallation Neutron Source.

== Science ==
The Center for Nanophase Materials Sciences (CNMS) at Oak Ridge National Laboratory is a United States Department of Energy / Office of Science Nanoscale Science Research Center operating as a collaborative and multidisciplinary user research facility. The CNMS is one of five Department of Energy nanoscale centers that form an integrated national user network. Each of the five is associated with other major national research facilities at one of Department of Energy's national laboratories, enabling their application to nanoscale science and technology.

To accomplish this, the CNMS integrates nanoscale science with three national needs:

- Neutron science, using the Spallation Neutron Source, and the recently upgraded High Flux Isotope Reactor.
- Synthesis science, also called “science-driven synthesis,” facilitated by extensive and novel synthesis capabilities in the CNMS' first five scientific themes (described below) and by a new nanofabrication research laboratory.
- Theory, modeling and simulation, through establishing a new nanomaterials theory institute, with close connections to the staff expertise and computational capabilities of Oak Ridge's Center for Computational Sciences and the new national Leadership Scientific Computing Facility.

== Scientific themes ==
Research in the CNMS is organized under seven related scientific themes and a nanofabrication research laboratory clean room) that have been selected to address challenges to scientific understanding as well as nanotechnology opportunities and needs.

- Macromolecular complex systems
- Functional nanomaterials
- Catalysis and nano-building blocks
- NanoPhysics: magnetism, transport, and scanning probes
- Bio-inspired nanomaterials
- Nanomaterials Theory Institute: theory, modeling, and simulation
- Nanoscale Structure and Dynamics: neutrons, electrons, and X-rays
- Nanofabrication research laboratory

== Facility and capabilities ==
The CNMS is housed in a new 80,000-square foot building on Chestnut Ridge adjacent to the Spallation Neutron Source. Construction of the facility began in August 2003 and was completed in April 2005, with the research program beginning operation in October 2005. The four-level main building comprises wet and dry laboratories, office space, and common areas to promote interaction among staff, long-term research guests, and users. It is equipped with a wide range of specialized tools for synthesis, characterization, and integration of hard and soft materials. The 10,000-square foot nanofabrication research laboratory, housed in a one-level wing of the building, includes clean rooms and an area designed to meet the requirements of electron beam imaging and writing instruments (low electromagnetic field, low vibration, low acoustic noise). The Nanomaterials Theory Institute provides collaborative work spaces, visualization equipment, and high-speed connections to the terascale computing facilities of Oak Ridge's National Center for Computational Sciences and the national Leadership Scientific Computing Facility. The intense neutron beams of the Spallation Neutron Source and of the recently upgraded High Flux Isotope Reactor afford unique opportunities for fundamental studies of the structure and dynamics of nanoscale materials. The CNMS provides a gateway to these and other Oak Ridge user facilities, including electron microscopy, for users whose research can benefit from access to multiple facilities.

== User research program ==
The CNMS user program provides access to equipment for nanoscale research and engineering. Access is through brief user research proposals that are peer-reviewed by an external Proposal Review Committee. Nanoscience user activities were initiated during 2003, prior to completion of the CNMS building, with the first CNMS "Jump Start" Call for Proposals (July–August 2003).
