= Linda Horton =

American materials scientist

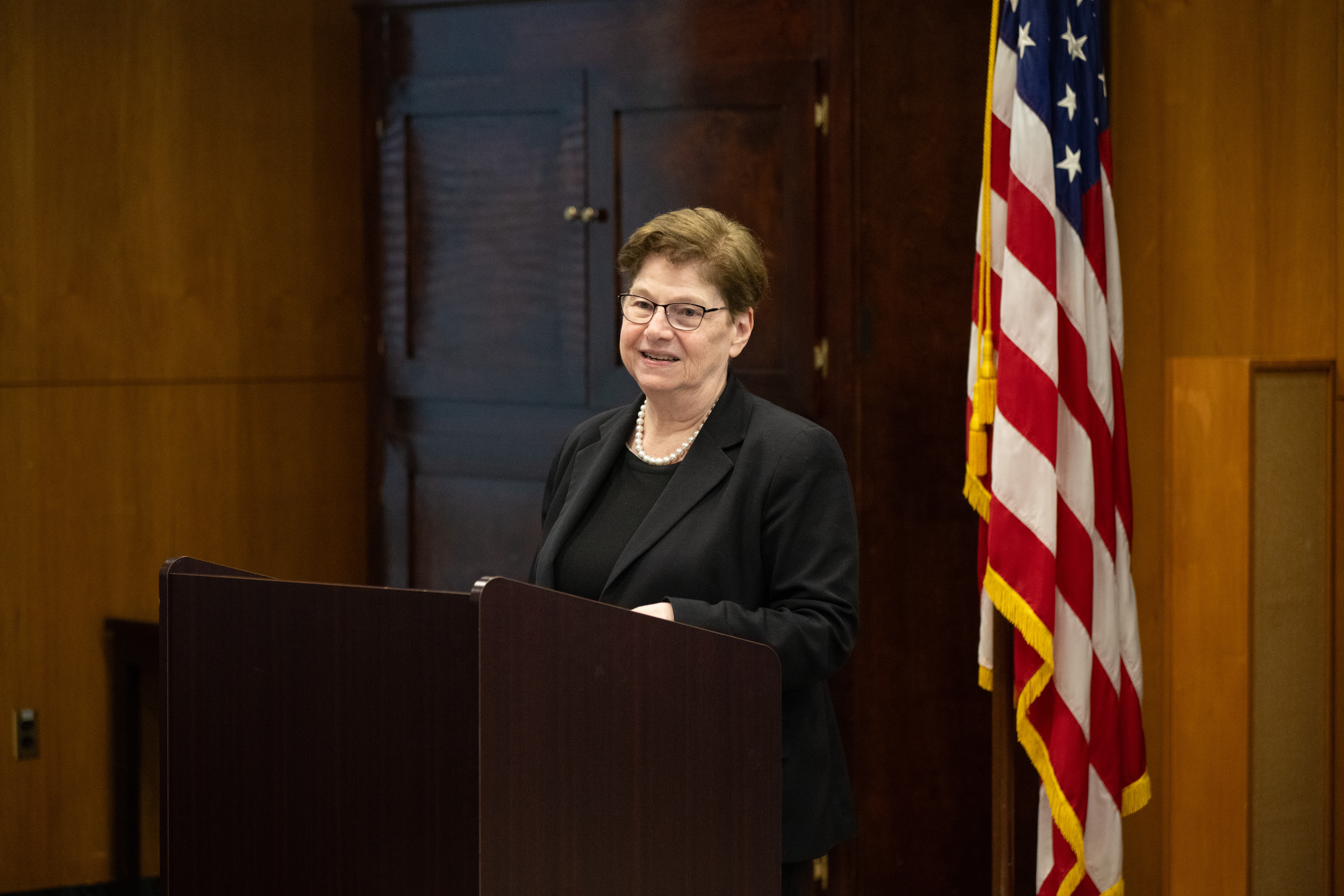
- Education: University of Virginia
- Scientific career
- Fields: Materials science
- Workplaces: Office of Basic Energy Sciences at the US Department of Energy; Oak Ridge National Laboratory

Linda L. Horton is an American materials scientist and the director of the Office of Basic Energy Sciences (BES) at the United States Department of Energy. She is also acting in the role of director of the BES' Materials Sciences and Engineering Division.

== Education ==
Horton received her Ph.D. from the University of Virginia in Materials Science, and worked in the field of electron microscopy at Oak Ridge National Laboratory, where she became the Director for the Center for Nanophase Materials Sciences. She served on the Board of Directors for the Microscopy Society of America, the Materials Research Society, and ASM International.
