= Thomas Zacharia =

American computer scientist

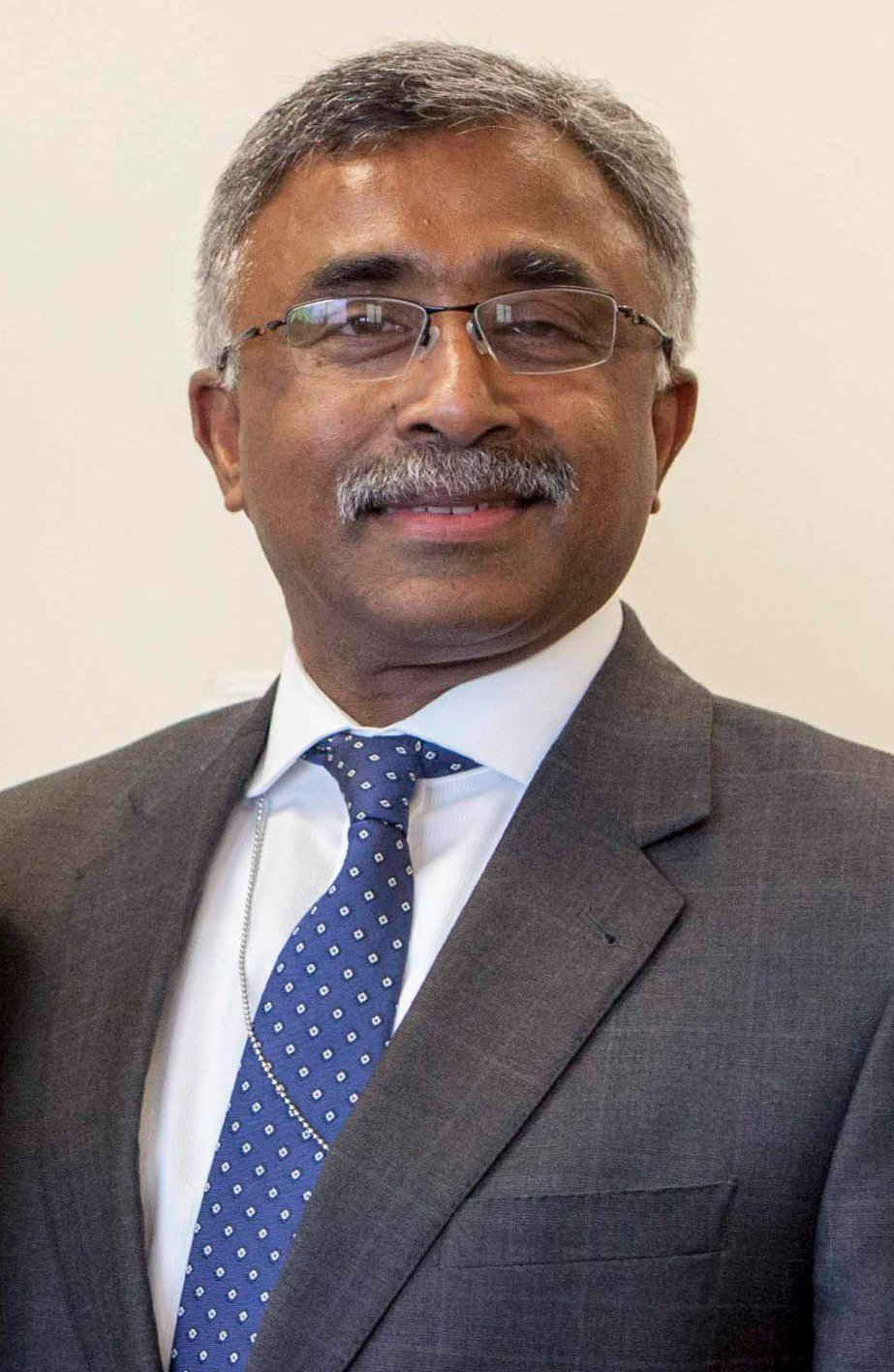
- Thomas Zacharia in 2017.
- Born: 1957 (age 68–69); Kerala, India

15th Director of the Oak Ridge National Laboratory
- In office July 1, 2017 – October 15, 2023
- President: Donald Trump; Joe Biden
- Preceded by: Thom Mason
- Succeeded by: Stephen Streiffer
- Scientific career
- Education: Clarkson University (Ph.D.); University of Mississippi (M.S.); National Institute of Technology, Karnataka (B.E.)
- Fields: Computational Materials Science
- Workplaces: Oak Ridge National Laboratory; Qatar Science & Technology Park; University of Tennessee; Clarkson University

Thomas Zacharia (born 1957 in Kerala, India) is an Indian-born American computer scientist. He received his bachelor's degree in mechanical engineering from National Institute of Technology, Karnataka in 1980 and a master's degree in Materials Science from the University of Mississippi in 1984. He obtained his doctoral degree from Clarkson University in 1987.

He has contributed to research in computational materials science, particularly on Marangoni Effect in solidification processes. He previously served as the executive vice president and chief port officer captain at Qatar Science & Technology Park at Qatar Foundation.

Zacharia was previously deputy director for science and technology at Oak Ridge National Laboratory and a professor at the University of Tennessee.

On June 1, 2017, UT-Battelle named Zacharia as ORNL's new laboratory director, succeeding Thom Mason. During his tenure, he launched the UT-Oak Ridge Innovation Institute, the Stable Isotope Production and Research Center, and the Quantum Science Center, among other initiatives. He retired in December 2022.

Notably, as director at ORNL, Zacharia oversaw the creation and implementation of the AMD-powered Frontier supercomputer; the first supercomputer to break the Exascale barrier. Zacharia subsequently joined AMD in 2024 as senior vice president of strategic technology partnerships and public policy, focusing on public/private relationships with governments, non-governmental organizations (NGOs) and other organizations to help fast-track the deployment of customized AI solutions for the public good.
