= Robert Coveyou =

American mathematician

Robert R Coveyou
- Born: February 9, 1915; Petoskey, Michigan, US
- Died: February 19, 1996; Oak Ridge, Tennessee, US
- Education: University of Chicago; University of Tennessee
- Known for: Pseudo-Random Number Generators, Medical Physics
- Scientific career
- Fields: Mathematics; Computer science
- Workplaces: Oak Ridge National Laboratory

Robert R. Coveyou (February 9, 1915 – February 19, 1996) was an American research mathematician who worked at the Oak Ridge National Laboratory. He also taught mathematics part-time for several years at Knoxville College and worked at the International Atomic Energy Agency in Vienna, Austria, while on leave from the Oak Ridge National Laboratory from 1968 until 1971.

An expert on pseudo-random number generators, today he is probably best known for the title of an article published around 1970: "Random Number Generation is too Important to be Left to Chance".

Coveyou was an original member of the small group of radiation protection specialists at the University of Chicago assembled under the leadership of Ernest O. Wollan in 1942/43 and moved to Oak Ridge, Tennessee as part of the Manhattan Project.

After the end of World War II he returned to Chicago to finish his undergraduate degree in Mathematics, and in the following year he received his master's degree from the University of Tennessee, both while employed at the Oak Ridge National Laboratory. He then returned to the laboratory for the remainder of his career, retiring in 1976.

In the early 1950s, Coveyou was one of the scientists and engineers involved in the early introduction of computers to the Oak Ridge National Laboratory and has been credited with naming the first computer housed at the laboratory: the ORACLE (Oak Ridge Automatic Computer and Logical Engine). In preparation for working on the computer in Oak Ridge, he spent two stretches of several weeks each at Remington Rand Corporation in New York City working with their staff to learn how they used the new UNIVAC computer.

Coveyou was a tournament chess player, and was Tennessee State Champion eight times. He is a member of the Tennessee Chess Hall of Fame, having been inducted with the inaugural class in 1990. He also mentored many young Oak Ridge and Tennessee chess players, with an unusual and effective approach to tutoring young players, emphasizing the mastery of simple end games before tackling more complex aspects of the game, including openings.

One of Coveyou's memorable chess experiences was hosting 13-year-old Bobby Fischer at his hotel room in Cleveland, Ohio, after Fischer had just won the 1957 U.S. Open. Coveyou, Fischer, and Edmar Mednis, a chess master from New York and friend of Fischer's, played informal games of chess for hours after the conclusion of the tournament, lasting into the early morning hours of the next day.

Bob Coveyou was also active politically and in the civil rights movement. He helped lead an effort to establish Scarboro High School in the African-American neighborhood of Oak Ridge. Prior to the school's opening, African American children there had had to bus to Knoxville, 30 miles away, to attend Austin High School. The school operated from 1950 until Oak Ridge High School was desegregated in the fall of 1955.
