= Oak Ridge National Laboratory =

Federal research center in Tennessee, US

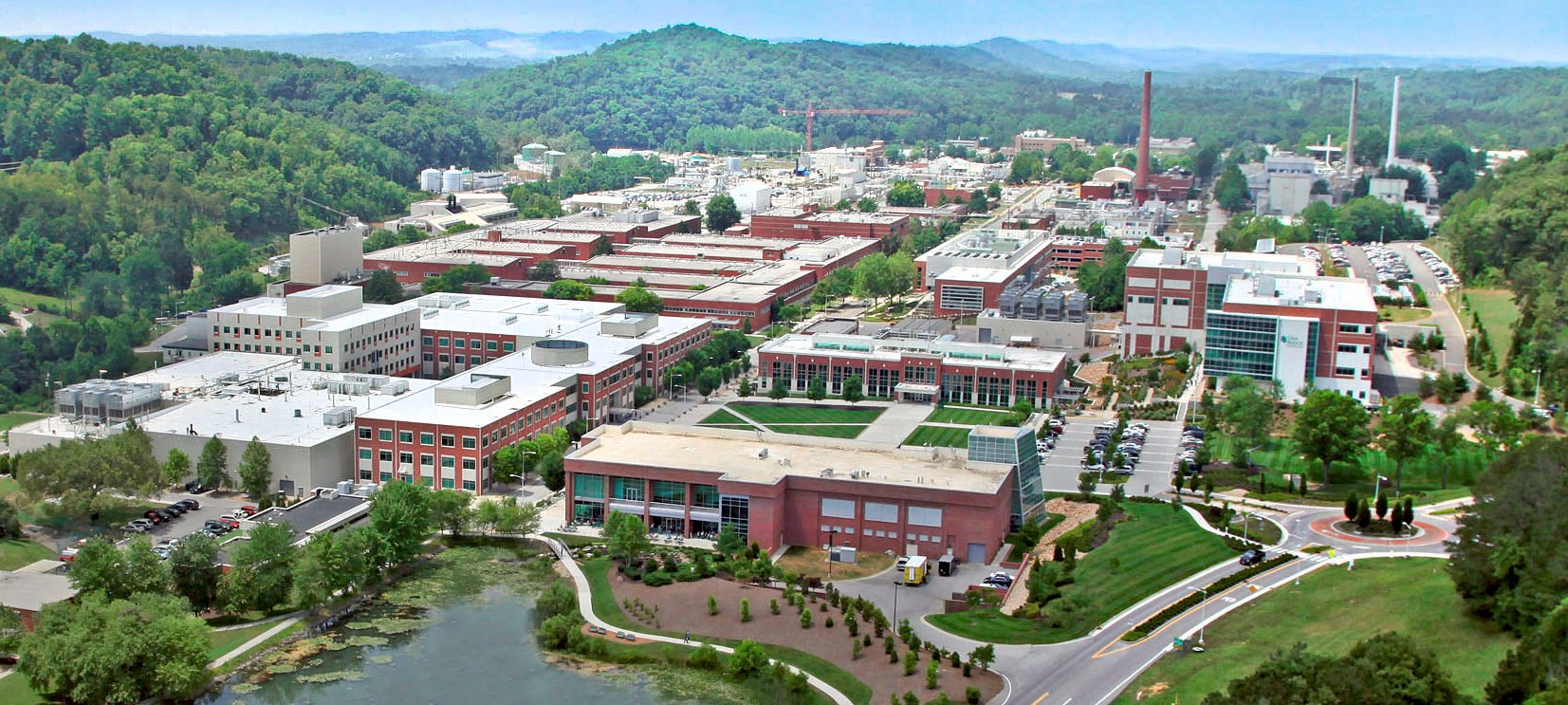
- Aerial view of ORNL's main campus in 2014
- Motto: "Solving Big Problems"
- Established: 1943; 83 years ago
- Research type: Multidisciplinary
- Budget: US$2.4 billion
- Field of research: Biology and Environment; Sustainable energy; Materials; National Security; Nuclear research; Neutron Science; Supercomputing
- Director: Stephen Streiffer
- Staff: 5,700
- Location: Oak Ridge, Tennessee, United States; 35.93°N 84.31°W
- Campus: ORNL occupies about 10,000 acres (40 km^{2}) of the approximately 35,000 acres (140 km^{2}) Oak Ridge Reservation
- Affiliations: United States Department of Energy (DOE)
- Operating agency: UT–Battelle
- Website: ornl.gov

Map
- Location within Tennessee

Oak Ridge National Laboratory (ORNL) is a federally funded research and development center in Oak Ridge, Tennessee, United States. Founded in 1943, the laboratory is sponsored by the United States Department of Energy and administered by UT–Battelle, LLC.

Established in 1943, ORNL is the largest science and energy national laboratory in the Department of Energy system by size and third largest by annual budget. It is located in the Roane County section of Oak Ridge. Its scientific programs focus on materials, nuclear science, neutron science, energy, high-performance computing, environmental science, systems biology and national security, sometimes in partnership with the state of Tennessee, universities and other industries.

ORNL has several of the world's top supercomputers, including Frontier, ranked by the TOP500 as the world's third most powerful. The lab is a neutron and nuclear power research facility that includes the Spallation Neutron Source, the High Flux Isotope Reactor, and the Center for Nanophase Materials Sciences.

== Overview ==
Oak Ridge National Laboratory is managed by UT–Battelle, a limited liability partnership between the University of Tennessee and the Battelle Memorial Institute, formed in 2000 for that purpose. The annual budget is US$2.4 billion. As of 2021, there is a staff of 5,700 working at ORNL, around 2,000 of whom are scientists and engineers, and an additional 3,200 guest researchers annually.

There are five campuses on the Department of Energy's Oak Ridge reservation: the National Laboratory, the Y-12 National Security Complex, the East Tennessee Technology Park (formerly the Oak Ridge Gaseous Diffusion Plant), the Oak Ridge Institute for Science and Education, and the developing Oak Ridge Science and Technology Park, although the four other facilities are unrelated to the National Laboratory. The total area of the reservation is 150 square kilometres (58 sq mi) of which the lab takes up 18 square kilometres (7 sq mi).

== History ==
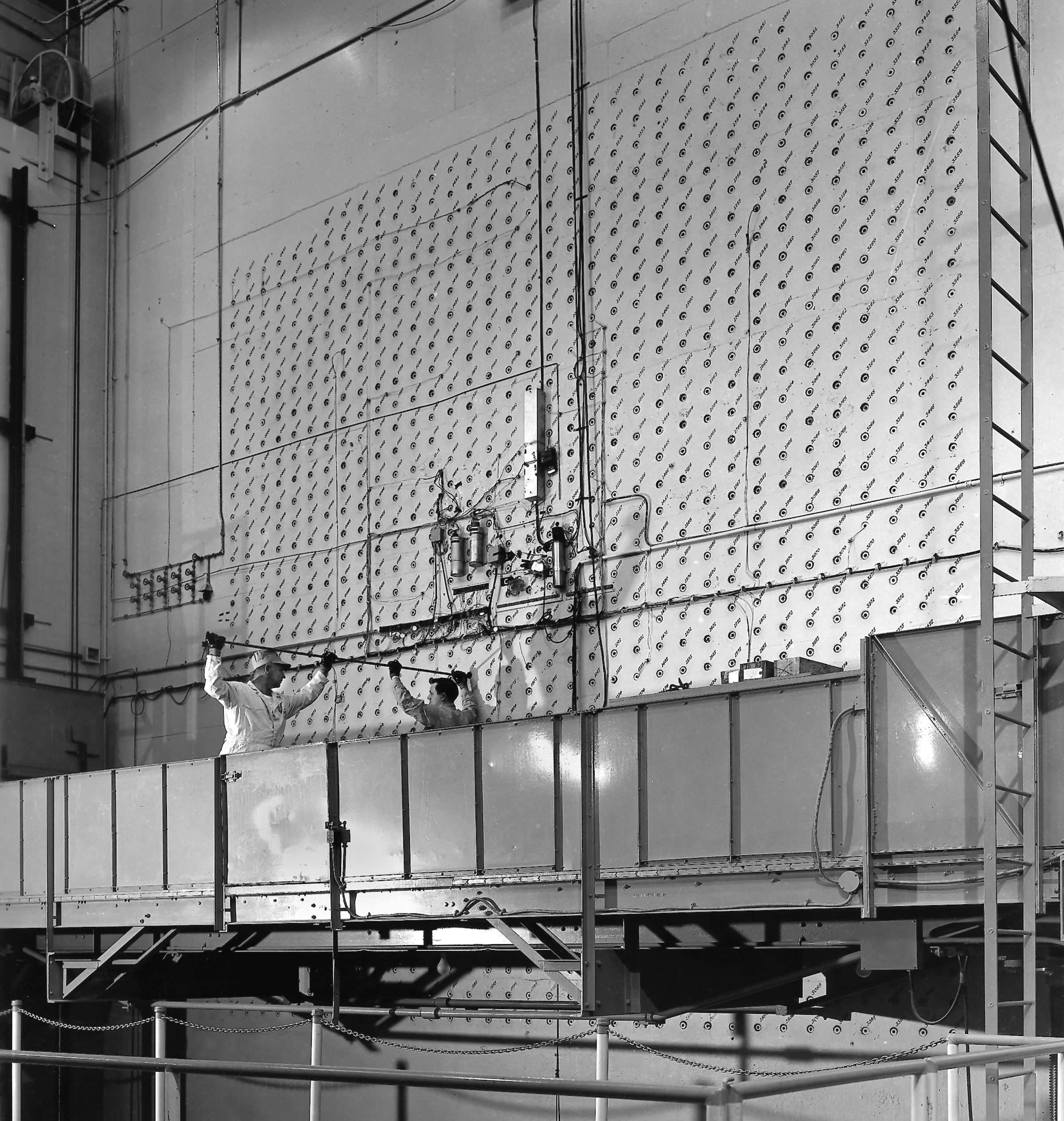
Workers in 1943 loading uranium slugs into the X-10 Graphite Reactor (now a National Historic Landmark)

In 1934, the Freel Farm Mound Site, an archaeological site and burial mound of the Late Woodland period was excavated. The site is currently inundated by Melton Hill Lake.

The city of Oak Ridge was established by the Army Corps of Engineers as part of the Clinton Engineer Works in 1942 on isolated farm land as part of the Manhattan Project. During World War II, advanced research for the government was managed at the site by the University of Chicago's Metallurgical Laboratory. In 1943, construction of the Clinton Laboratories, what would later be known as the Oak Ridge National Laboratory, was completed. The site was chosen for the X-10 Graphite Reactor, used to produce plutonium from natural uranium. Enrico Fermi and his colleagues developed the world's second self-sustaining nuclear reactor after Fermi's previous experiment, the Chicago Pile-1. The X-10 was the first reactor designed for continuous operation.

After the end of World War II, management of the lab was contracted by the US government to Monsanto; however, they withdrew in 1947. The University of Chicago temporarily re-assumed responsibility, with the site receiving the prestigious "National" laboratory designation, until in December 1947, when Union Carbide and Carbon Co., which already operated two other facilities at Oak Ridge, took control of the laboratory and renamed the site Oak Ridge National Laboratory (ORNL).

Post-war, the demand for military science had fallen dramatically, and the future of the lab was uncertain. The X-10 reactor and the laboratory's 1,000 employees were no longer involved in nuclear weapons. Instead, it was used for scientific research. In 1946 the first medical isotopes were produced in the X-10 reactor, and by 1950 almost 20,000 samples had been shipped to various hospitals. The quantity and variety of radionuclides produced by X-10 for medicine grew steadily in the 1950s. ORNL was the only Western source of californium-252. ORNL scientists also performed the world's first successful bone marrow transplant in mice by suppressing their immune systems.

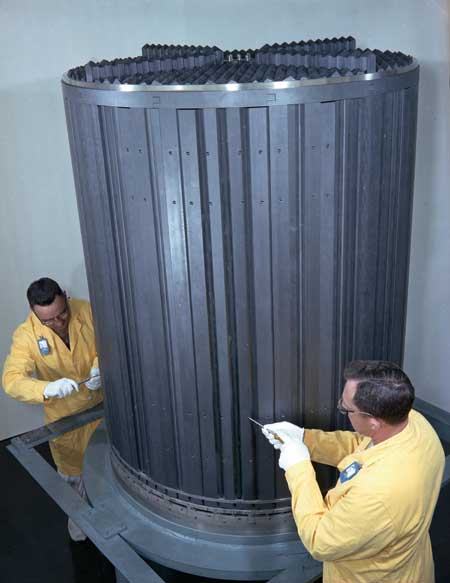
The core of the Molten Salt Reactor Experiment

In 1950 the Oak Ridge School of Reactor Technology was established with two courses in reactor operation and safety; almost 1,000 students graduated. Much of the research performed at ORNL in the 1950s was related to nuclear reactors as a form of energy production, both for propulsion and electricity. More reactors were built in the 1950s than in the rest of the ORNL's history combined. One of their most influential projects was the light-water reactor, a precursor to many modern nuclear power stations. The US Military funded much of its development, for nuclear-powered submarines and ships of the US Navy. The US Army also contracted the design of portable nuclear reactors in 1953 for heat and electricity generation in remote military bases. The reactors were produced by the American Locomotive Company and used in Greenland, the Panama Canal Zone, and Antarctica. The US Air Force also contributed funding to three reactors, the lab's first computers, and its first particle accelerators. ORNL built its first molten salt reactor in 1954 as a proof-of-concept for a proposed fleet of long-range bombers, but it was never used.

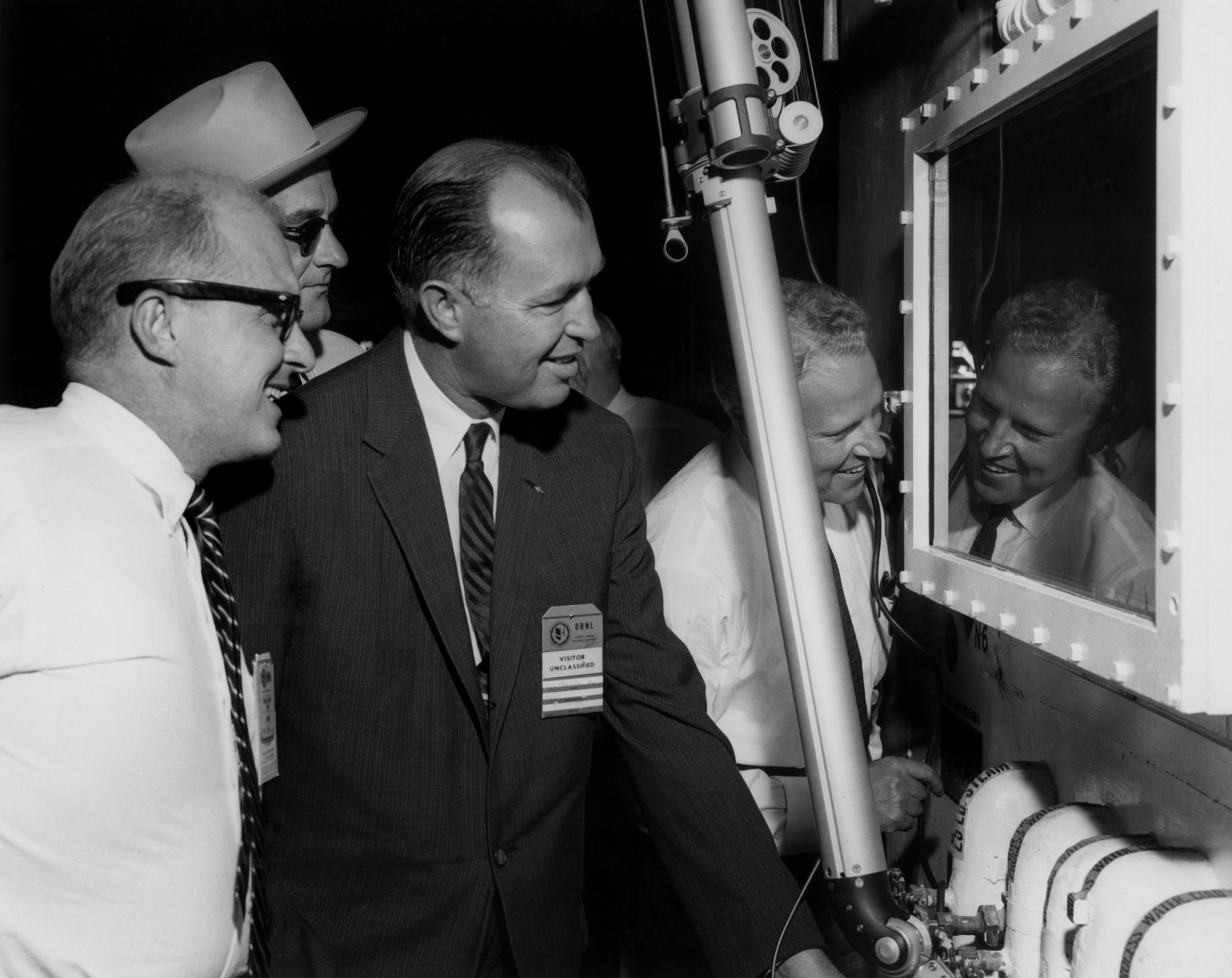
Cayce Pentecost, Lyndon B. Johnson, Buford Ellington and Albert Gore Sr. operating mechanical hands at a hot cell at Oak Ridge, on October 19, 1958

Alvin M. Weinberg was named Director of Research, ORNL, and in 1955 Director of the Laboratory. In the early 1960s there was a large push at ORNL to develop nuclear-powered desalination plants, where deserts met the sea, to provide water. The project, called Water for Peace, was backed by John F. Kennedy and Lyndon B. Johnson and was presented at a 1964 United Nations conference, but increases in the cost of construction and falling public confidence in nuclear power caused the plan to be shuttered. The Health Physics Research Reactor built in 1962 was used for radiation exposure experiments leading to more accurate dosage limits and dosimeters, and improved radiation shielding.

In 1964 the Molten-Salt Reactor Experiment began with the construction of the reactor. It operated from 1966 until 1969 (with six months down time to move from U-235 to U-233 fuel) and proved the viability of molten salt reactors, while also producing fuel for other reactors as a byproduct of its own reaction. The High Flux Isotope Reactor built in 1965 had the highest neutron flux of any reactor at the time. It improved upon the work of the X-10 reactor, producing more medical isotopes as well as allowing higher fidelity of materials research. Researchers in the biology division studied the effects of chemicals on mice, including petrol fumes, pesticides, and tobacco.

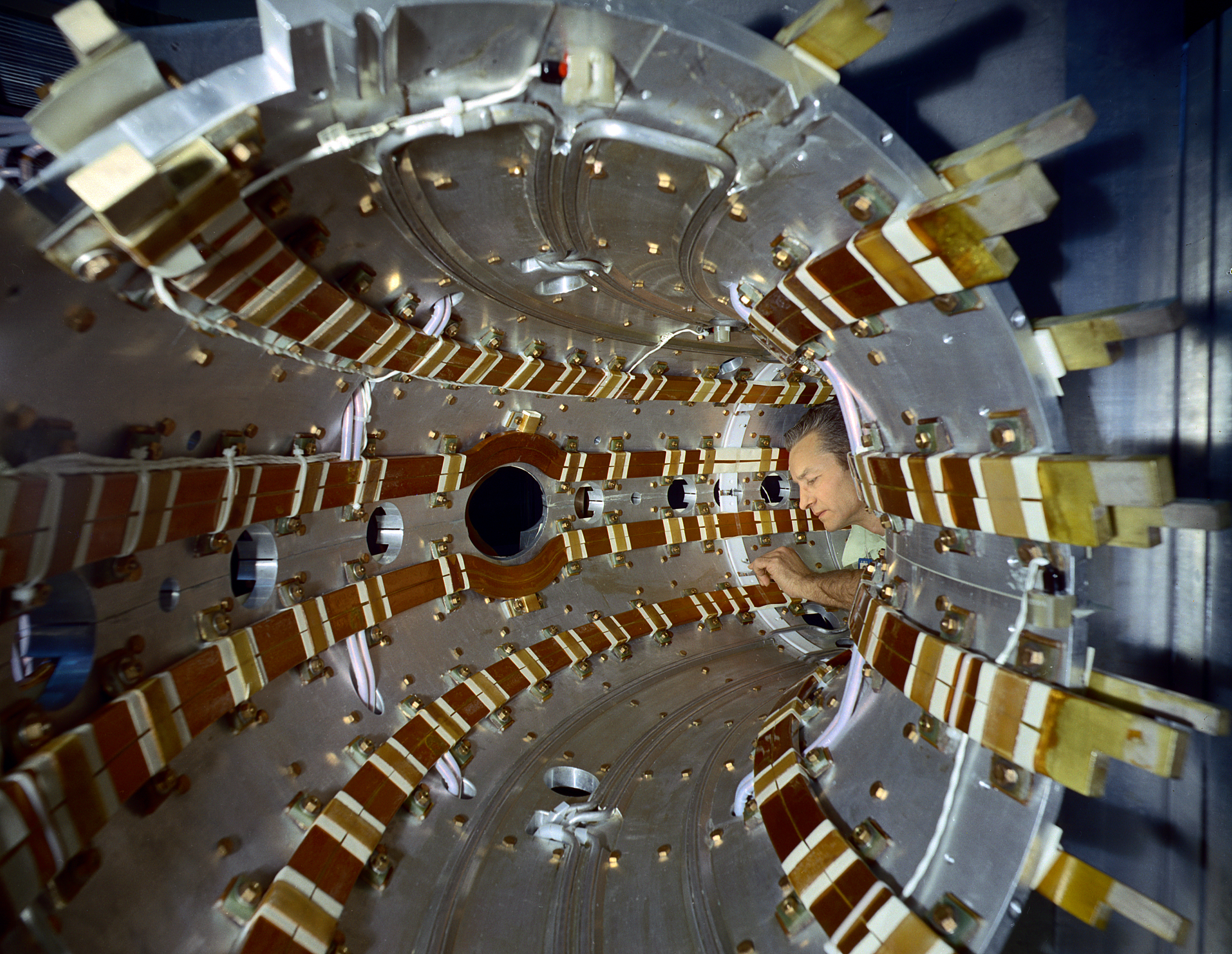
The inside of ORMAK, an early tokamak, was gold plated for reflectivity

In the late 1960s, cuts in funding led to the cancellation of plans for another particle accelerator, and the United States Atomic Energy Commission cut the breeder reactor program by two-thirds, leading to a downsizing in staff from 5,000 to 3,800. In the 1970s, the prospect of fusion power was strongly considered, sparking research at ORNL. A tokamak called ORMAK, made operational in 1971, was the first tokamak to achieve a plasma temperature of 20 million Kelvin. After the success of the fusion experiments, it was enlarged and renamed ORMAK II in 1973; however, the experiments ultimately failed to lead to fusion power plants.

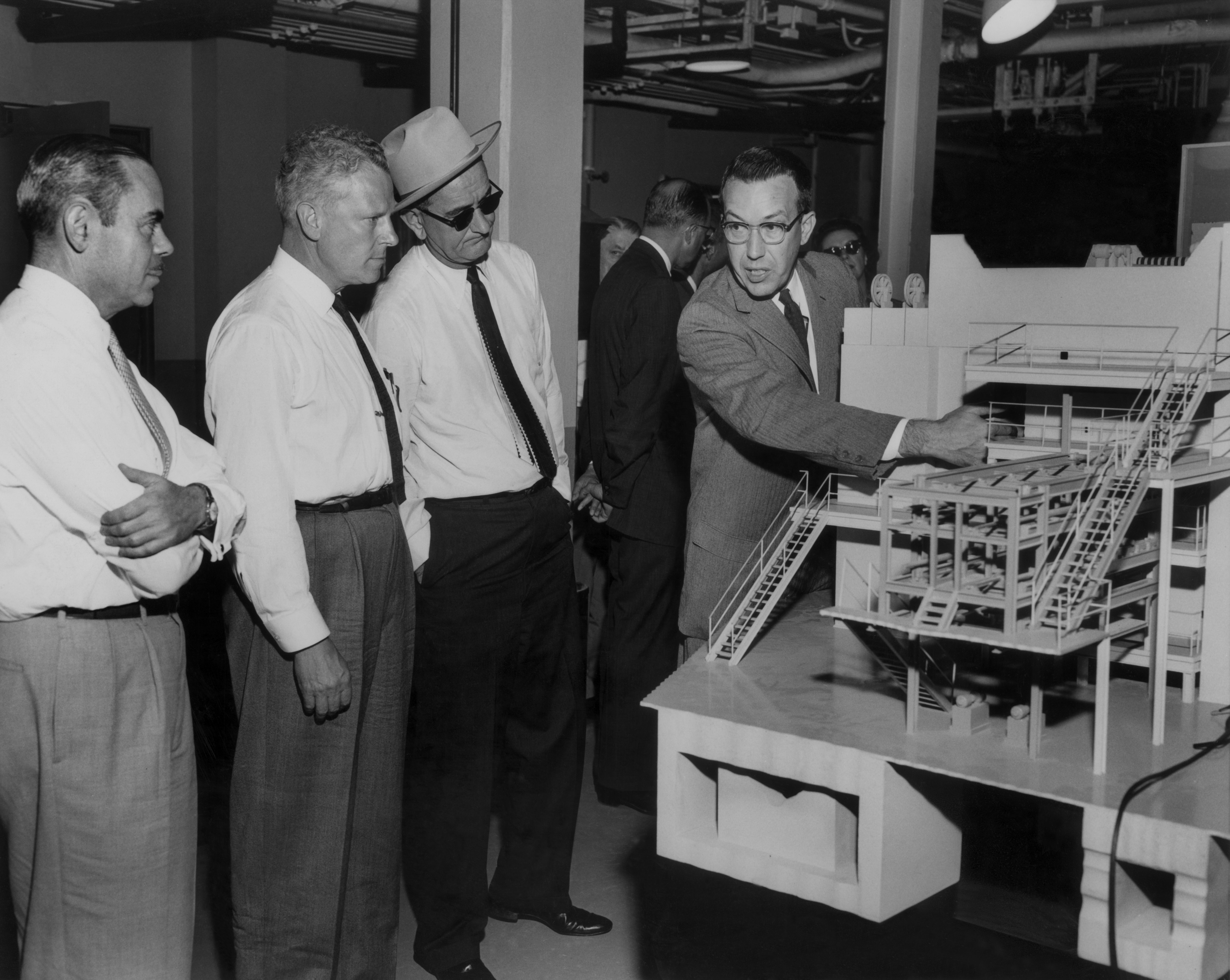
S.R. Sapirie, Senator Albert Gore Sr., Senator Lyndon Johnson and Dr.John Swartout looking at a model of a graphite reactor at Oak Ridge National Lab, on October 19, 1958

The US Atomic Energy Commission (AEC) required improved safety standards in the early 1970s for nuclear reactors, so ORNL staff wrote almost 100 requirements covering many factors including fuel transport and earthquake resistance. In 1972 the AEC held a series of public hearings where emergency cooling requirements were highlighted and the safety requirements became more stringent. Also in 1972, Peter Mazur, a biologist at ORNL, froze with liquid nitrogen, thawed and implanted mouse embryos in a surrogate mother. The mouse pups were born healthy. The technique is popular in the livestock industry, as it allows the embryos of valuable cattle to be transported easily and a prize cow can have multiple eggs extracted and thus, through in vitro fertilisation, have many more offspring than would naturally be possible.

In 1974 Alvin Weinberg, director of the lab for 19 years, was replaced by Herman Postma, a fusion scientist. In 1977 construction began for 6 metre (20 foot) superconducting electromagnets, intended to control fusion reactions. The project was an international effort: three electromagnets were produced in the US, one in Japan, one in Switzerland and the final by remaining European states. ORNL was involved in analyzing the damage to the core of the Three Mile Island Nuclear Generating Station after the accident in 1979.

The 1980s brought more changes to ORNL: a focus on efficiency became paramount. An accelerated climate simulation chamber was built that applied varying weather conditions to insulation to test its efficacy and durability faster than real time. Materials research into heat resistant ceramics for use in truck and high-tech car engines was performed, building upon the materials research that began in the nuclear reactors of the 1950s. In 1987 the High Temperature Materials Laboratory was established, where ORNL and industry researchers cooperated on ceramic and alloy projects. The materials research budget at ORNL doubled after initial uncertainty regarding Reagan's economic policy of less government expenditure. In 1981, the Holifield Heavy Ion Research Facility, a 25 MV particle accelerator, was opened at ORNL. At the time, Holifield had the widest range of ion species and was twice as powerful as other accelerators, attracting hundreds of guest researchers each year.

The Department of Energy was concerned with the pollution surrounding ORNL, and it began clean-up efforts. Burial trenches and leaking pipes had contaminated the groundwater beneath the lab, and radiation tanks were sitting idle, full of waste. Estimates of the total cost of clean-up were into the hundreds of millions of US dollars. The five older reactors were subjected to safety reviews in 1987, ordered to be deactivated until the reviews were complete. By 1989 when the High Flux Isotope Reactor was restarted, the US supply of certain medical isotopes was depleted. In 1989 the former executive officer of the American Association for the Advancement of Science, Alvin Trivelpiece, became director of ORNL; he remained in the role until 2000.

In 1992 whistleblower Charles Varnadore filed complaints against ORNL, alleging safety violations and retaliation by his superiors. While an administrative law judge ruled in Varnadore's favor, Secretary of Labor Robert Reich overturned that ruling. However, Varnadore's case saw prime contractor Martin Marietta cited for safety violations and ultimately led to additional whistleblower protection within DOE.

In January 2019 ORNL announced a major breakthrough in its capacity to automate Pu-238 production which helped push annual production from 50 grams to 400 grams, moving closer to NASA's goal of 1.5 kilograms per year by 2025 in order to sustain its space exploration programs.

In June 2026, amidst the Iran War and efforts to end it, Axios reported that Trump envoys Jared Kushner and Steve Witkoff visited the laboratory to meet with nuclear experts that could take part in future nuclear talks between the United States and Iran regarding Iran's nuclear program.

== Areas of research ==
ORNL conducts research and development activities that span a wide range of scientific disciplines. Many research areas have a significant overlap with each other; researchers often work in two or more of the fields listed here. The laboratory's major research areas are described briefly below.

- Chemical sciences: ORNL conducts both fundamental and applied research in numerous areas, including catalysis, surface science and interfacial chemistry; molecular transformations and fuel chemistry; heavy element chemistry and radioactive materials characterization; aqueous solution chemistry and geochemistry; mass spectrometry and laser spectroscopy; separations chemistry; materials chemistry including synthesis and characterization of polymers and other soft materials; chemical biosciences; and neutron science.
- Electron microscopy: the program investigates key issues in condensed matter, materials, chemical and nanosciences.
- Nuclear medicine: research is focused on the development of improved reactor production and processing methods to provide medical radioisotopes, the development of new radionuclide generator systems, the design and evaluation of new radiopharmaceuticals for applications in nuclear medicine, and oncology.
- Physics: research is focused primarily on studies of the fundamental properties of matter at the atomic, nuclear, and subnuclear levels and the development of experimental devices in support of these studies.
- Population: ORNL provides federal, state and international organizations with a gridded population database, called Landscan, for estimating ambient population. LandScan is a raster image, or grid, of population counts, which provides human population estimates every 30 x 30 arc seconds, which translates roughly to population estimates for 1 kilometer square windows or grid cells at the Equator, with cell width decreasing at higher latitudes. Though many population datasets exist, LandScan is the best spatial population dataset, updated annually. Landscan data are accessible through GIS applications and a USAID public domain application called Population Explorer.

=== Energy ===
The laboratory has a long history of energy research; nuclear reactor experiments have been conducted since the end of World War II in 1945. Because of the availability of reactors and high-performance computing resources, an emphasis on improving the efficiency of nuclear reactors is present. The programs develop more efficient materials, more accurate simulations of aging reactor cores, sensors and controls as well as safety procedures for regulatory authorities.

The Energy Efficiency and Electricity Technologies Program aims to improve air quality in the US and reduce dependence on foreign oil supplies. There are three key areas of research: electricity, manufacturing and mobility. The electricity division focuses on reducing electricity consumption and finding alternative sources for production. Buildings, which account for 39% of US electricity consumption as of 2012, are a key area of research as the program aims to create affordable, carbon-neutral homes. Research also takes place into higher efficiency solar panels, geothermal electricity and heating, lower cost wind generators, and the economic and environmental feasibility of potential hydro power plants.

The Fusion Energy Division pursues short-term goals to develop components such as high-temperature superconductors, high-speed hydrogen pellet injectors, and suitable materials for future fusion research. Much research into the behaviour and maintenance of plasma takes place at the Fusion Energy Division to further the understanding of plasma physics, a crucial area for developing a fusion power plant. The US ITER office is at ORNL with partners at Princeton Plasma Physics Laboratory and Savannah River National Laboratory. The US contribution to the ITER project is 9.1% which is expected to be in excess of US$1.6 billion throughout the contract. ORNL researchers participated in developing of an extensive research plan for the US-ITER collaboration detailed in 2022.

=== Biology ===
Biological research covers ecology, forestry, genomics, computational biology, structural biology and bioinformatics. The BioEnergy Program aims to improve the efficiency of all stages of the biofuel process to improve the energy security of the United States. The program aims to make genetic improvements to the potential biomass used, formulate methods for refineries that can accept a diverse range of fuels, and to improve the efficiency of energy delivery both to power plants and end users.

The Center for Molecular Biophysics conducts research into the behaviour of biological molecules in various conditions. The center hosts projects that examine cell walls for biofuel production, use neutron scattering to analyze protein folding, and simulate the effect of catalysis on a conventional and quantum scale. ORNL is home to a field site for the National Ecological Observatory Network (NEON), which has a field office nearby. The Department of Energy works closely with the Tennessee Wildlife Resources Agency out of ORNL to monitor forest ecology for the surrounding Appalachians & Cumberland Plateau Domain of NEON.

=== Neutron science ===
There are two neutron sources at ORNL; the High Flux Isotope Reactor (HFIR) and the Spallation Neutron Source (SNS). HFIR provides neutrons in a stable beam resulting from a constant nuclear reaction whereas SNS, a particle accelerator, produces pulses of neutrons. HFIR went critical in 1965 and has been used for materials research and as a major source of medical radioisotopes since. As of 2013, HFIR provides the world's highest constant neutron flux as a result of various upgrades. Berkelium-249, used to synthesize tennessine for the first time, was produced in the HFIR as part of an international effort. HFIR is likely to operate until approximately 2060 before the reactor pressure vessel is considered unsafe for continued use.

The SNS has the highest intensity neutron pulses of any human-made neutron source. SNS was made operational in 2006 and has since been upgraded to 1 megawatt with plans to continue up to 3 MW. High-power neutron pulses permit clearer images of the targets, meaning smaller samples can be analyzed and accurate results require fewer pulses.

=== Materials ===
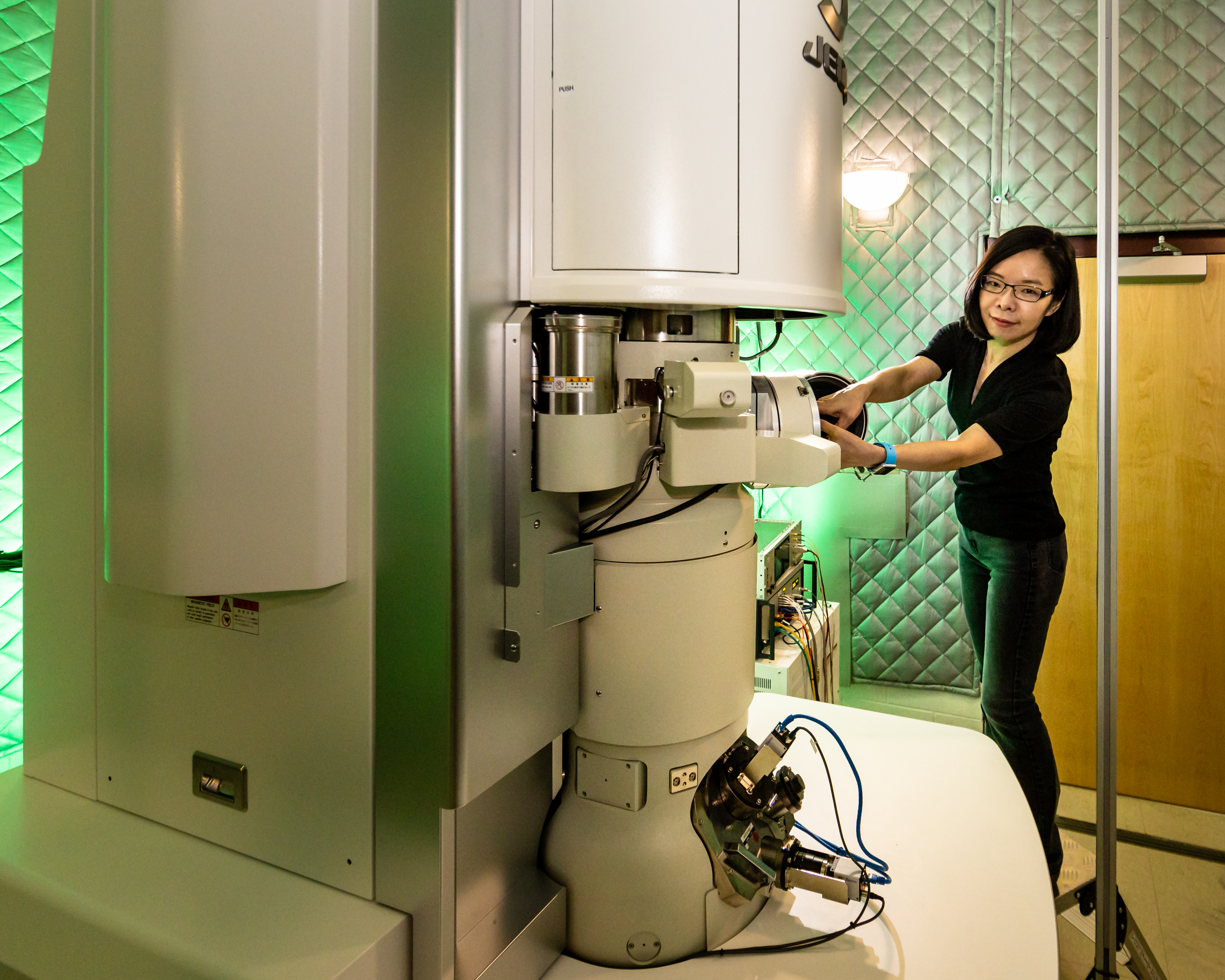
The Advanced Microscopy Laboratory at ORNL

Between 2002 and 2008 ORNL partnered with Caterpillar Inc. to develop a new steel for their diesel engines that can withstand large temperature fluctuations. The new material, named CF8C Plus, is based on conventional CF8C stainless steel with added manganese and nitrogen; the result has better high–temperature properties and is easier to cast at a similar cost. In 2003 the partners received an R&D 100 award from R&D magazine and in 2009 received an award for "excellence in technology transfer" from the Federal Laboratory Consortium for the commercialization of the steel.

There is a high-temperature materials lab at ORNL that permits researchers from universities, private companies and other government initiatives to use their facilities. As is the case for all designated user facilities, the resources of the High Temperature Materials Laboratory are available for free if the results are published; private research is permitted but requires payment.

The Center for Nanophase Materials Sciences (CNMS) researches the behaviour and fabrication of nanomaterials. The center emphasises discovery of new materials and the understanding of underlying physical and chemical interactions that enable creation of nanomaterials. In 2012, CNMS produced a lithium-sulfide battery with a theoretical energy density three to five times greater than existing lithium ion batteries.

=== Security ===
ORNL provides resources to the United States Department of Homeland Security and other defense programs. The Global Security and Nonproliferation (GS&N) program develops and implements policies, both US based and international, to prevent the proliferation of nuclear material. The program has developed safeguards for nuclear arsenals, guidelines for dismantling arsenals, plans of action should nuclear material fall into unauthorised hands, detection methods for stolen or missing nuclear material, and trade of nuclear material between the US and Russia. The GS&N's work overlaps with that of the Homeland Security Programs Office, providing detection of nuclear material and nonproliferation guidelines. Other areas concerning the Department Homeland Security include nuclear and radiological forensics, chemical and biological agent detection using mass spectrometry, and simulations of potential national hazards.

=== High-performance computing ===
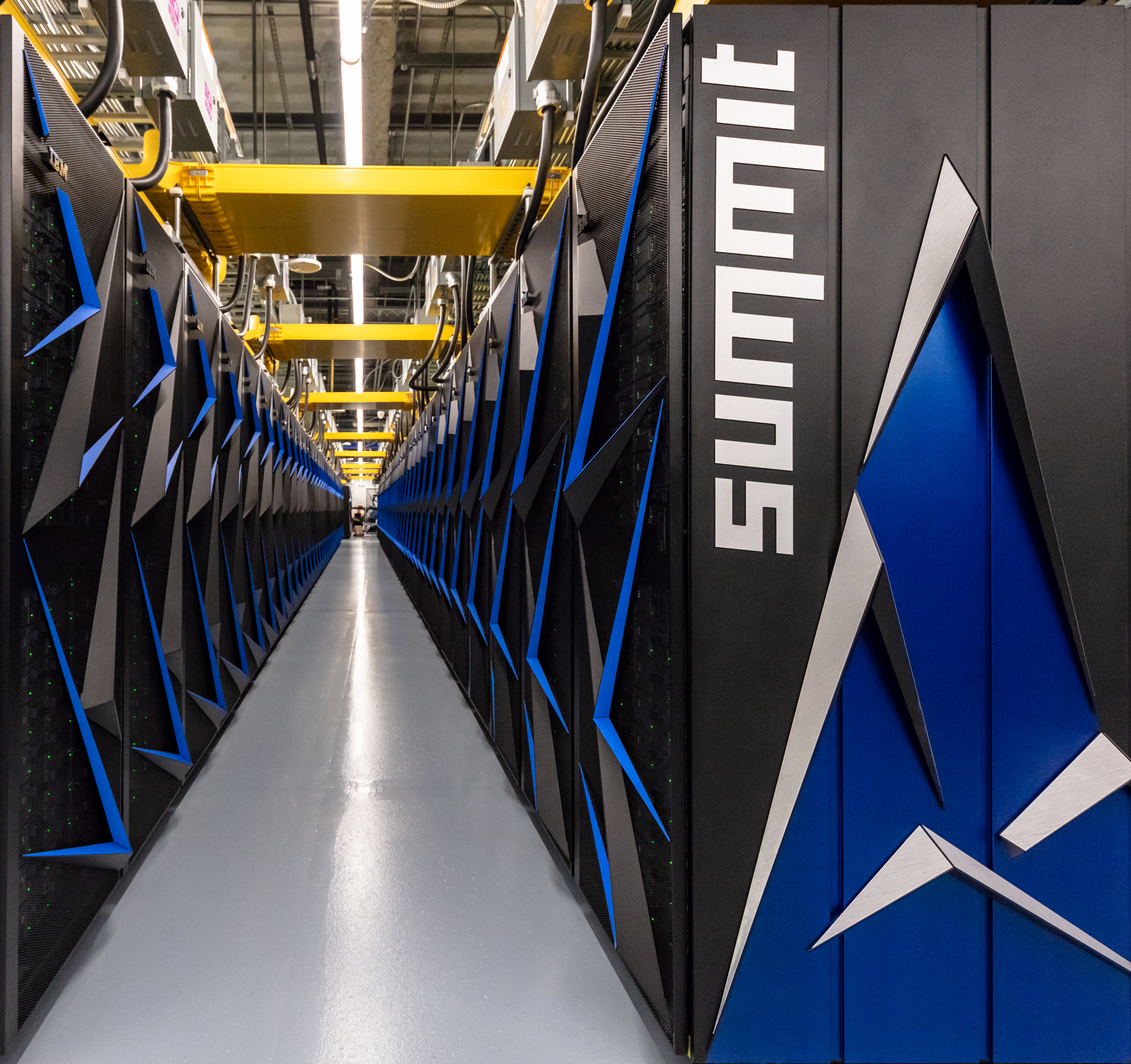
Summit, developed at ORNL, was the world's fastest supercomputer from November 2018 to June 2020.

ORNL has been the site of various supercomputers, home to the fastest on several occasions. In 1953, ORNL partnered with the Argonne National Laboratory to build ORACLE (Oak Ridge Automatic Computer and Logical Engine), a computer to research nuclear physics, chemistry, biology, and engineering. ORACLE had 2048 words (80 Kibit) of memory and took approximately 590 microseconds to perform addition or multiplication of integers. In the 1960s ORNL was equipped with an IBM 360/91 and an IBM 360/65. In 1995 ORNL bought an Intel Paragon based computer called the Intel Paragon XP/S 150 that performed at 154 gigaFLOPS and ranked third on the TOP500 list of supercomputers. In 2005 Jaguar was built, a Cray XT3-based system that performed at 25 teraFLOPS and received incremental upgrades up to the XT5 platform that performed at 2.3 petaFLOPS in 2009. It was recognised as the world's fastest from November 2009 until November 2010. Summit was built for Oak Ridge National Laboratory during 2018, which benchmarked at 122.3 petaFLOPS. As of June 2020, Summit was the world's second fastest [clocked] supercomputer with 202,752 CPU cores, 27,648 Nvidia Tesla GPUs, and 250 Petabytes of storage, having lost the top position to the Japanese Fugaku supercomputer. In May 2022, the ORNL Frontier system broke the exascale barrier, achieving 1.102 exaflop/s using 8,730,112 cores.

Since 1992 the Center for Computational Sciences has overseen high performance computing at ORNL. It manages the Oak Ridge Leadership Computing Facility that contains the machines. In 2012, Jaguar was upgraded to the XK7 platform, a fundamental change as GPUs are used for the majority of processing, and renamed Titan. Titan performed at 17.59 petaFLOPS and held the number 1 spot on the TOP500 list for November 2012. Other computers include a 77 node cluster to visualise data that the larger machines output in the Exploratory Visualization Environment for Research in Science and Technology (EVEREST), a visualisation room with a 10 by 3 metre (30 by 10 ft) wall that displays 35 megapixel projections. Smoky is an 80 node Linux cluster used for application development. Research projects are refined and tested on Smoky before running on larger machines such as Titan.

In 1989 programmers at the Oak Ridge National Lab wrote the first version of Parallel Virtual Machine (PVM), software that enables distributed computing on machines of differing specifications. Jack Dongarra of ORNL and the University of Tennessee wrote the LINPACK software library and LINPACK benchmarks, used to calculate linear algebra and the standard method of measuring floating point performance of a supercomputer as used by the TOP500 organisation.

== Laboratory directors ==
The following persons served as director of Oak Ridge National Laboratory:

No.	Image	Director	Term start	Term end	Refs.
1		Martin D. Whitaker	1943	1945	
2		James Lum	1945	1947	
3		Prescott Sandidge	1947	1948	
4		Nelson Rucker	1948	1950	
5		Clarence Larson	1950	1955	
6		Alvin M. Weinberg	1955	1973	
7		Floyd Culler	1973	1974	
8		Herman Postma	1974	1988	
Interim		Alex Zucker	1988	1989	
9		Alvin Trivelpiece	January 1, 1989	March 31, 2000	
10		William Madia	April 1, 2000	2003	
11		Jeff Wadsworth	August 1, 2003	June 30, 2007	
12		Thomas Mason	July 1, 2007	June 30, 2017	
13		Thomas Zacharia	July 1, 2017	December 31, 2022	
14		Stephen Streiffer	October 16, 2023	present	

== Notable people ==
- Elda Emma Anderson
- Ilias Belharouak
- Manson Benedict
- Leslie Benmark
- Jane Blankenship
- Everitt P. Blizard
- Lyle Benjamin Borst
- Hermann Bottenbruch
- Marilyn A. Brown
- Paula Cable-Dunlap
- Thure E. Cerling
- Robert Coveyou
- Sheldon Datz
- Jack Dongarra
- John H. Ebersole
- Julie Ezold
- John H. Gibbons
- Amit Goyal
- Eugene Guth
- Michael Heath
- Linda Horton
- Alston Scott Householder
- Chun-Hway Hsueh
- George Samuel Hurst
- Mujaddid Ahmed Ijaz
- Sergei V. Kalinin
- William Rudolph Kanne
- Cresson Kearny
- Tamara G. Kolda
- Clarence Larson
- Henri A. Levy
- Dan Lindsley
- Herbert G. MacPherson
- William Madia
- Thomas Mason
- Jim May
- Dade Moeller
- G. William Morgan
- Karl Z. Morgan
- Stephen E. Nagler
- Jagdish Narayan
- Peter Nellist
- C. Maurice Patterson
- Clarice Phelps
- Frances Pleasonton
- Ward Plummer
- Herman Postma
- Red Raper
- Hyman G. Rickover
- Larry Robinson
- Amy Rosemond
- Liane Russell
- Clifford Shull
- Dorothy Martin Simon
- David Joseph Singh
- Nicholas M. Smith Jr.
- Olaf Storaasli
- Stephen Streiffer
- Jan B. Talbot
- Arpad Vass
- Alvin M. Weinberg
- Eugene Wigner
- Ernest O. Wollan
- Ying Xu
- Herbert York
- Gale J. Young
- Thomas Zacharia

== See also ==
- American Museum of Science and Energy
- Brookhaven National Laboratory
- Center for Nanophase Materials Sciences
- K-25 Gaseous Diffusion Plant
- Los Alamos National Laboratory
- National Transportation Research Center
- Pacific Northwest National Laboratory
- S-50 (Manhattan Project)
- Sandia National Laboratory
- Spallation Neutron Source
- Thorium Energy Alliance
- United States Department of Energy National Laboratories and Technology Centers
- USS Oak Ridge, commissioned in 1944
- Y-12 National Security Complex
