= Clarence Larson =

American nuclear chemist (1909–1999)

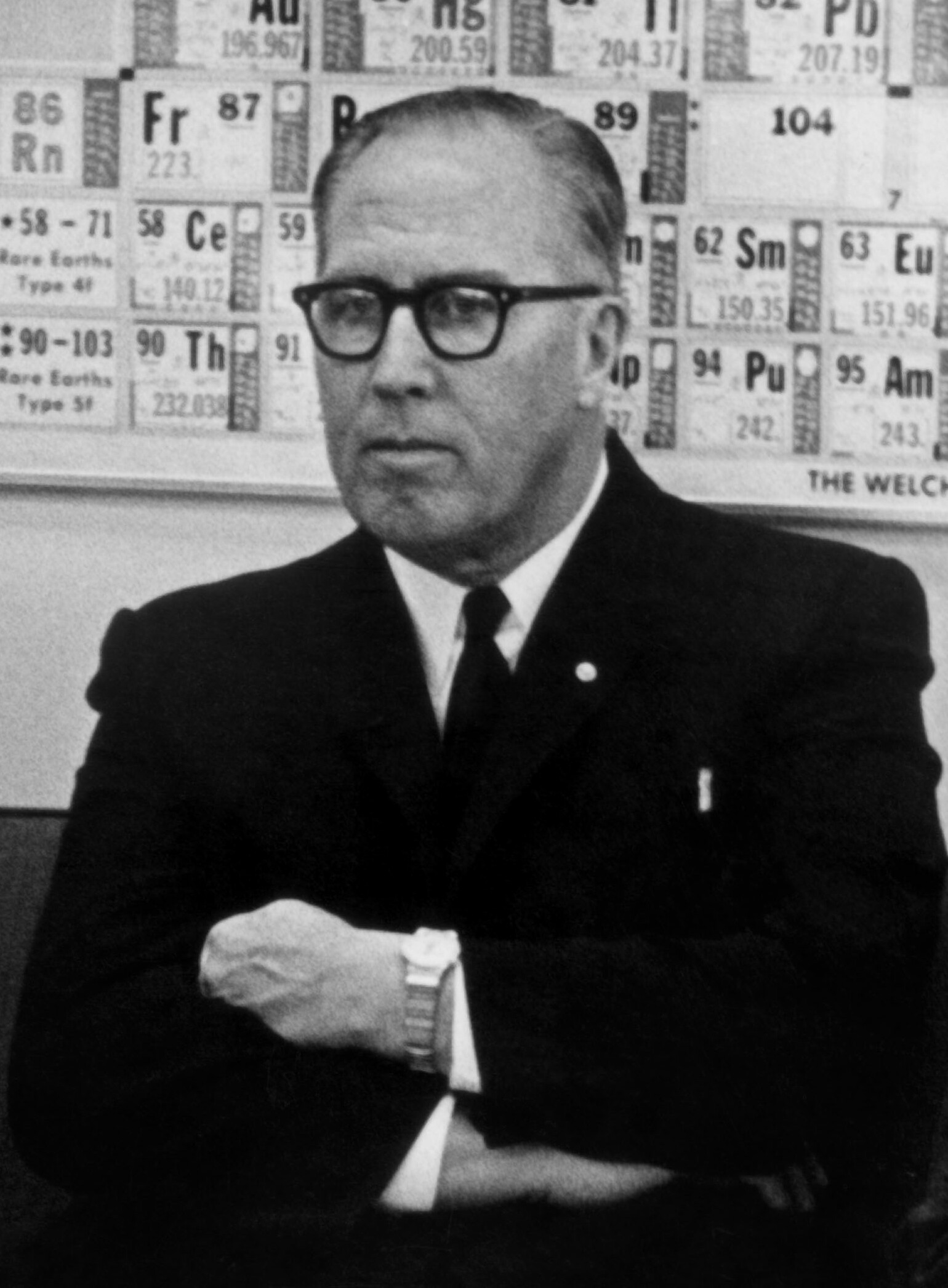
- Larson in 1965
- Born: September 20, 1909; Cloquet, Minnesota, U.S.
- Died: February 15, 1999 (aged 89); Bethesda, Maryland, U.S.
- Known for: Director of Oak Ridge National Laboratory (1950–1955); Executive of Union Carbide (1955–1969); Commissioner of United States Atomic Energy Commission (1969–1974)
- Scientific career
- Fields: Chemistry, nuclear physics

Clarence Edward Larson (September 20, 1909 – February 15, 1999) was an American chemist, nuclear physicist and industrial leader. He was involved in the Manhattan Project, and was later director of Oak Ridge National Laboratory and commissioner of the U.S. Atomic Energy Commission.

== Early life and education ==
Larson was born in Cloquet, Minnesota, in 1909. As a teenager he was involved in church groups and the local YMCA, and occasionally acted as a substitute minister at nearby parishes. In his primary education, Larson was selected for a class that combined both seventh and eighth grades which meant he entered high school a year younger than his peers. In high school he created his own telegraph network between his neighbors' houses by collecting discarded parts from the Bell telephone company. He had not intended to attend university as very few high school graduates in his home town did so.

Larson studied chemistry and chemical engineering at the University of Minnesota, graduating in 1932, and obtained a Ph.D. at the University of California, Berkeley, studying blood clotting. While there, Larson designed a glass electrode in order to measure the acidity of flowing solutions.

His later work focused on isotopes produced by a cyclotron, invented by his future colleague Ernest Lawrence. His study of the behavior of ions in electric fields gave him a good understanding of electrochemistry, which he would later come to use in the Manhattan Project. From 1939 to 1942 Larson chaired the Chemistry Department at the College of the Pacific, where he continued his cyclotron research, which led to his recruitment into the Manhattan Project.

== Y-12 National Security Complex ==
Larson was senior chemist from 1942 to 1945 on Ernest Lawrence's team that oversaw the construction and operation of the Y-12 National Security Complex. The plant used electromagnetic isotope separation to produce most of the uranium-235 for Little Boy, the nuclear bomb dropped on Hiroshima. Larson suggested and oversaw improvements to the plant that increased the yield of the process. Uranium atoms were buried in the walls of the stainless steel receivers by the calutrons, then recovered chemically. Larson's solution was to copper-plate the receivers, which increased the yield as more atoms could be more easily recovered from copper than stainless steel. In 1948, Larson became the director of the Y-12 Complex.

== Oak Ridge National Laboratory ==
In 1950, Larson was appointed director of Oak Ridge National Laboratory. He oversaw a US$20 million (US$255 million in 2013) expansion of the laboratory, the creation of three nuclear reactors at the site, and a partnership with the U.S. Navy to design nuclear-powered ships. He also began an experiment into nuclear-powered aircraft. He served as director until 1955.

== Union Carbide ==
In 1955, Larson left Oak Ridge, Tennessee, to become vice president of the National Carbon Division of Union Carbide Corporation. He returned to Oak Ridge from 1961 to 1969, as president of Union Carbide Nuclear Division, when the company was tasked with management of Oak Ridge National Laboratory. He oversaw management of the laboratory, the Y-12 Plant and the K-25 Gaseous Diffusion Plant, and was also responsible for the Paducah Gaseous Diffusion Plant.

== Atomic Energy Commission ==
Larson was appointed commissioner of the U.S. Atomic Energy Commission thanks to his reputation as a "knowledgeable and judicious administrator". He served as commissioner from 1969 to 1974, a time of great uncertainty for the nuclear industry. He commissioned a series of public hearings on nuclear reactor safety, especially concerning emergency cooling. The AEC turned to Larson's former employer, Oak Ridge National Laboratory, to aid in the formation of reactor regulations.

== Personal life ==
Larson was married twice, first to Jerry and later to Jane Warren. He had three sons. He died in 1999 of pneumonia at a hospital in Bethesda, Maryland.

== Accolades ==
Larson was elected to the National Academy of Engineering in 1973 for "the development of processes for recovery and purification of uranium and leadership in nuclear plant design."

== Publications ==
- The Relation of the Physical-Chemical States of Blood Calcium, 1937
- Uranium and Hydrogen Functions of Uranium Glass Electrodes - with H. W. Alter, Thomas William Newton, published by U.S. Atomic Energy Commission, Technical Information Branch, 1949
- The Scientist and Creativity - published by U.S. Atomic Energy Commission, 1969
- Technology and Economy of Light Water Reactors, 1973
