= National Transportation Research Center =

Coordinates: 35.9543°N 84.1545°W

The National Transportation Research Center (NTRC) is an institution, located in Knoxville, Tennessee, that conducts research and development aimed at increasing the efficiency and safety of transportation systems and reducing their energy utilization and effects on the environment.

It is operated as a partnership between the United States Department of Energy, the University of Tennessee, and Oak Ridge National Laboratory (ORNL) and is located approximately halfway between the university campus and the ORNL site in Oak Ridge.

About two-thirds of the 83,000 sq ft (7,700 m^{2}) NTRC building contains research laboratories.
