= Herman Postma =

American scientist

- Born: March 29, 1933; Wilmington, North Carolina, U.S.
- Died: November 7, 2004 (aged 71); Hawaii, U.S.
- Known for: Director of Oak Ridge National Laboratory 1974–1988
- Scientific career
- Fields: Plasma physics

Herman Postma (March 29, 1933 – November 7, 2004) was an American scientist and educational leader. Born in Wilmington, North Carolina, he moved to Oak Ridge, Tennessee, in 1959 after attending Duke, Harvard and MIT. Much of Postma's career was at Oak Ridge National Laboratory where he served as Laboratory Director from 1974 to 1988.

== Early life ==
Postma was born in Wilmington, North Carolina, on March 29, 1933, to Dutch farmers Gilbert and Sophia Postma. His father did not finish seventh grade and his mother did not finish high school, however, he described his father as "very inventive" when fixing problems on the family farm.

== Education ==
Postma had a passion for education, not only his own but for providing it to others. During his time at New Hanover High School he was inspired by his teachers, particularly his algebra teacher. Postma graduated from high school in 1951 moving immediately to higher education at Duke University. Initially he had considered being a medical doctor but was put off by the difficulty and prospect of surgery. As a result of placing first in a statewide physics contest and second place in maths he decided studying physics would be an easier option than medicine. As part of his education at Duke, Postma had to choose between working at IBM in New York City or Oak Ridge National Laboratory, he chose the National Laboratory as it was closer although had not expected to make a career of it. In his summer breaks from 1954 to 1957 Postma worked in Oak Ridge National Laboratory's Electro-nuclear and Physics department and, upon graduation from Harvard University in 1959, became a member of staff. He took all available classes concerning plasma physics at Harvard and later took classes at MIT studying plasma physics and nuclear engineering.

[My colleagues] loved science. And, they taught me to like, particularly, physics. You don't get that out of a dry book at Duke or anywhere else. You have to experience it.

— Herman Postma, 2003.

Postma took Russian classes at Oak Ridge High School in Oak Ridge, Tennessee, as an adult while he was working at the Oak Ridge National Laboratory in order to ease collaboration with Soviet scientists. By the early 1970s he was almost fluent.

Postma maintained a close relationship with Duke University, where he, his wife and two children all graduated. He was a member of the board of trustees at Duke from 1987 to 1999 where he encouraged easier access to learning facilities and efficiency within the university.

== Career ==
From 1959, Postma was a full-time researcher at Oak Ridge National Laboratory (ORNL), largely focused on plasma physics with the goal of achieving fusion power. Notably, he developed the neutral beam injection technique; shooting a beam of high energy atoms into plasma to initiate fusion, as well as other methods of heating plasma stochastically in fusion reactors.

Early in his career at ORNL he was working under Clarence Barnett, measuring the cross sections of nuclear species, whom Postma proved wrong by identifying inconsistencies in his measurements. By 1961 Postma was involved directly in plasma physics research and in 1968 he became director of Oak Ridge National Laboratory's Thermonuclear Division (fusion). Later that year he attended a conference in Russia where the world's first tokamak was revealed. Postma decided that his laboratory would also build one named ORMAK (Oak Ridge tokaMAK).

On January 1, 1974, he was appointed director of Oak Ridge National Laboratory, the first director not to have worked on the Manhattan Project. Postma's appointment as laboratory director brought drastic changes to the laboratory; he focused on fusion research rather than fission, to which the lab had traditionally been associated, and reducing the United States' dependence on foreign oil supplies. He had received professional management training which he put into practice, restructuring the management of ORNL. Prior to his changes, researchers had to become managers to increases their salaries, Postma created two career paths, one for managers and another for scientists. He also created the Seed Money Program which uses overhead funds to "seed" proposals that review committees consider promising. The program remains in place and is considered one of the management's most successful initiatives. The governing body responsible for ORNL changed under his direction from the United States Atomic Energy Commission to the Energy Research and Development Administration in 1974, then in 1977 it was merged into the Department of Energy, a turbulent time for the laboratory. Postma also pushed to transfer research and technologies to recipients other than just government; he formed the Distinguished Scientist program with the University of Tennessee and involved private industry in research.

Postma retired from his position as laboratory director in 1988 and worked as senior vice president of Martin Marietta Energy Systems from then until 1992.

== Later life and death ==
Postma suffered from a rare form of muscular dystrophy which restricted his movement. To retain mobility he was an early adopter of a Segway PT and notably used it in the Hart Senate Office Building when called to testify before a senate committee on national laboratory reform. Postma died suddenly of his condition while on vacation in Hawaii on November 7, 2004.

== Personal life ==
In 1960, Postma married Pat, the former of assistant dean at the University of Tennessee College of Business. They had two children, Peter and Pamela, and two grandchildren.

Postma was an avid traveler which was reflected in his community efforts. He was a founding member of the Sister City program in Oak Ridge and collaborated with Shigeko Uppuluri and Dr. Alvin Weinberg to create the International Friendship Bell and A.K. Bissell Park, a Japanese park in Oak Ridge to symbolize peace after the atomic bombing of Japan.

== Legacy ==
- In 2005 Solway Bridge was renamed "Dr. Herman Postma Memorial Bridge", to recognize his endeavors in the community and at Oak Ridge National Laboratory.
- The Postma Young Professional Medal has been awarded annually since 2005 to young professionals who have positively impacted the Oak Ridge community culture. The medal bears Herman and Pat Postma as they often worked together in their community service.
