= William Madia =

American scientist (born 1947)

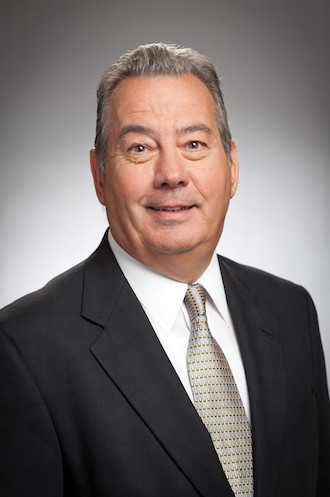
- Born: 1947 (age 77–78); Wilkinsburg, Pennsylvania, U.S.
- Education: Indiana University of Pennsylvania; Virginia Polytechnic Institute
- Known for: Director of Pacific Northwest National Laboratory; Director of Oak Ridge National Laboratory 2000-2003; President and Director of Battelle Columbus Laboratories; President of Battelle Technology International; President's Advisory Committee for nuclear science and engineering at MIT; Vice President Stanford University
- Spouse: Audrey DeLaquil
- Awards: Secretary of Energy's Gold Award, Laboratory Director of the Year
- Scientific career
- Fields: Chemistry, nuclear physics
- Institutions: Battelle, Stanford

William (Bill) J. Madia (born 1947) is an American scientist and laboratory director. Madia holds a Ph.D. in nuclear chemistry, a field in which most of his career was focused at Battelle. In his early twenties, Madia was drafted into the US Army where he trained nuclear reactor operators. He later worked for Battelle, a non-profit research company where he began as a researcher before being promoted to direct various laboratories across the United States and Western Europe. Madia retired in 2007 and joined Stanford University in early 2008. He retired from Stanford in 2019 and is now President of Madia & Associates, Inc. a management consulting firm.

== Education ==
Madia was born in 1947 in Wilkinsburg, Pennsylvania and grew up a few miles away in Swissvale. Many of his high school friends went into careers in the steel mills of Pittsburgh but Madia wanted to be the first in his family to attend a university. He was accepted into both Penn State University and Indiana University of Pennsylvania (IUP) in 1965. He paid for his own education by working as a dish washer. He chose IUP because it cost $200 less per year. In his later years at university, he worked summers in a steel mill to pay for tuition. Madia became a member of Sigma Tau Gamma and studied chemistry, graduating with a Bachelor of Science in chemistry in 1969, followed by a master's degree in 1971.

After attaining his Master's, Madia went to Texas A&M University to earn a Ph.D. in nuclear physics but before he had settled in he was drafted into the U.S. Army. Madia trained nuclear reactor operators as part of the Army's nuclear power program in Washington D.C. for the Joint Chiefs of Staff before he returned to study. He attained a Ph.D. in nuclear chemistry at Virginia Tech in twenty seven months, the standing record for fastest Ph.D. at the university.

== Career ==
In 1975, Madia began work at Battelle in Columbus, Ohio, in their nuclear research department. Madia created the first nuclear fuel cycle analysis group at Battelle. He also developed non-proliferation procedures and managed the plutonium fuel fabrication laboratory, various hot cells and critical assembly facilities. After the Three Mile Island accident he was made a member of Department of Energy's "Blue Ribbon Panel" to advise on decontamination and decommissioning of the plant. In 1985 he was promoted to laboratory director of the Columbus Laboratories and later became President of Battelle Technology International, managing laboratories in Frankfurt and Geneva.

Madia was appointed Director of Pacific Northwest National Laboratory in 1994 where he served until 2000. While at PNNL, he oversaw the construction and startup of the Environmental Molecular Sciences Laboratory (EMSL) and the elevation of the lab to formal national laboratory status. On April 1, 2000, Madia was appointed Director of Oak Ridge National Laboratory, and CEO of UT-Battelle, where he served until 2003. Construction of the Spallation Neutron Source and Center for Nanophase Materials, the Department of Energy's first nanoscience laboratory, began under his direction, and he led a laboratory-wide modernization effort. As part of the modernization Madia attracted the investment of private companies to fund buildings to host the National Center for Computational Sciences and the supercomputer Jaguar, beginning a trend of high performance computing that continued for at least a decade.

Madia returned to Battelle in 2003 as Executive Vice President for Laboratory Operations where he remained until retirement in 2007, although he continued to involve himself with Battelle and recently was recognized for his 50 years of service with Battelle. In 2008 he joined Stanford University where he was appointed vice president for the Stanford Linear Accelerator Center (SLAC), where he oversaw the laboratory as serves as chairman of the Board of Overseers. In this capacity, he represented Stanford to the US Department of Energy. He also serves a director of United States Enrichment Corporation, now Centrus Energy (LEU: NYSE) a uranium enrichment company. Previously, he served on the boards for Chicago Bridge and Iron and Atkins Nuclear Holdings. Madia is also an advisor for EnerTech Capital Partners, a green energy, venture capital firm. Currently, he serves a chairman of the board of Type 1 Energy, a fusion company focused on developing a commercial fusion stellarator.

== Personal life ==
Madia met Audrey DeLaquil at a student union dance in his freshman year at Indiana University of Pennsylvania, whom he married shortly after graduation. They have three children; Joe, Ben and Will and four grand children, Augi, Hattie, Isabelle and Enzo.

== Accolades ==
- Madia Department of Chemistry, Biochemistry, Physics and Engineering at Indiana University of Pennsylvania
- Army Commendation Medal - for his work in nuclear engineering.
- Distinguished Alumni Award — Indiana University of Pennsylvania, awarded in 1988.
- Gold Award - Secretary of Energy
- Distinguished Associate Award — US Department of Energy
- Secretary's Award, US Department of Energy
- Warren Medal, United States Government.
- Laboratory Director of the Year 1999 - Federal Laboratory Consortium
- Research Award in Chemistry - Sigma Xi.
