= Stephen Streiffer =

American engineer

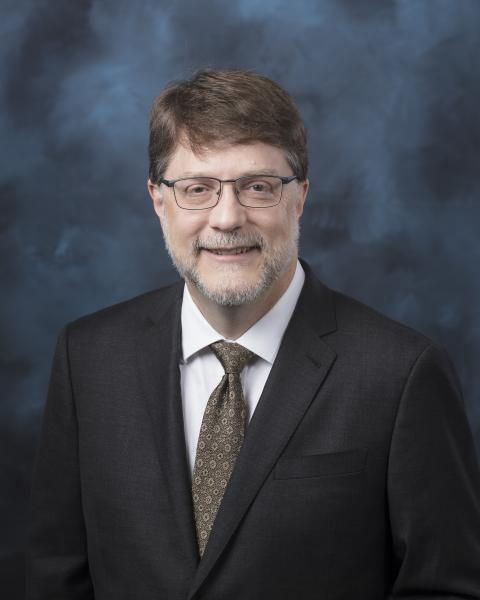
- Streiffer in 2023

16th Director of the Oak Ridge National Laboratory
- Incumbent
- Assumed office October 16, 2023
- President: Joe Biden
- Preceded by: Thomas Zacharia
- Scientific career
- Education: Rice University (BS); Stanford University (PhD)
- Fields: Material Science
- Workplaces: North Carolina State University; Argonne National Laboratory; SLAC National Accelerator Laboratory; Oak Ridge National Laboratory
- Thesis: Microstructural characterization of the initial stages of growth of yttrium barium copper oxide thin films: A comparison of lattice -matched and non-lattice-matched growth (1993)
- Doctoral advisor: John C. Bravman

Stephen K. Streiffer (born 6 January 1966) is an American materials scientist who began serving as the director of Oak Ridge National Laboratory in 2023. Prior to this position, he served as interim director at SLAC National Accelerator Laboratory. Streiffer joined Stanford University in 2022 as vice present for SLAC National Accelerator Laboratory after 24 years at Argonne National Laboratory.

== Early life ==
Streiffer grew up in Baton Rouge, Louisiana. In 1987, he received his bachelor's degree in materials science and engineering from Rice University. In 1993, he completed his doctorate in materials science and engineering from Stanford University.

== Career ==
Streiffer began his career at North Carolina State University as a research assistant professor. In 1998, he moved to Argonne National Laboratory as a researcher in the Materials Science Division. He was awarded the status of Fellow by the American Physical Society in 2007, for "experimental studies of ferroelectric thin film physics, that have established the relationships between epitaxial strain, ferroelectric phase transition behavior and domain structure, and size effects, and for advancing the fundamental understanding of complex oxide thin film microstructure."

After serving in various roles at Argonne, he became the associate laboratory director for photon sciences and director of the Advanced Photon Source in 2015. On July 1, 2020, he was named the Argonne National Laboratory deputy director for science and technology. From 2020 to 2022, he was also the co-director of the National Virtual Biotechnology, the United States Department of Energy's effort to combat COVID-19.

In June 2022, he became Stanford University’s vice president for SLAC National Accelerator Laboratory. During the search for a permanent director of SLAC National Accelerator Laboratory, he served as interim lab director beginning in February 2023. In July 2023, Streiffer was announced as director of Oak Ridge National Laboratory beginning on October 16.

== See also ==
- List of fellows of the American Physical Society (1998–2010)
