= Paula Cable-Dunlap =

American chemist

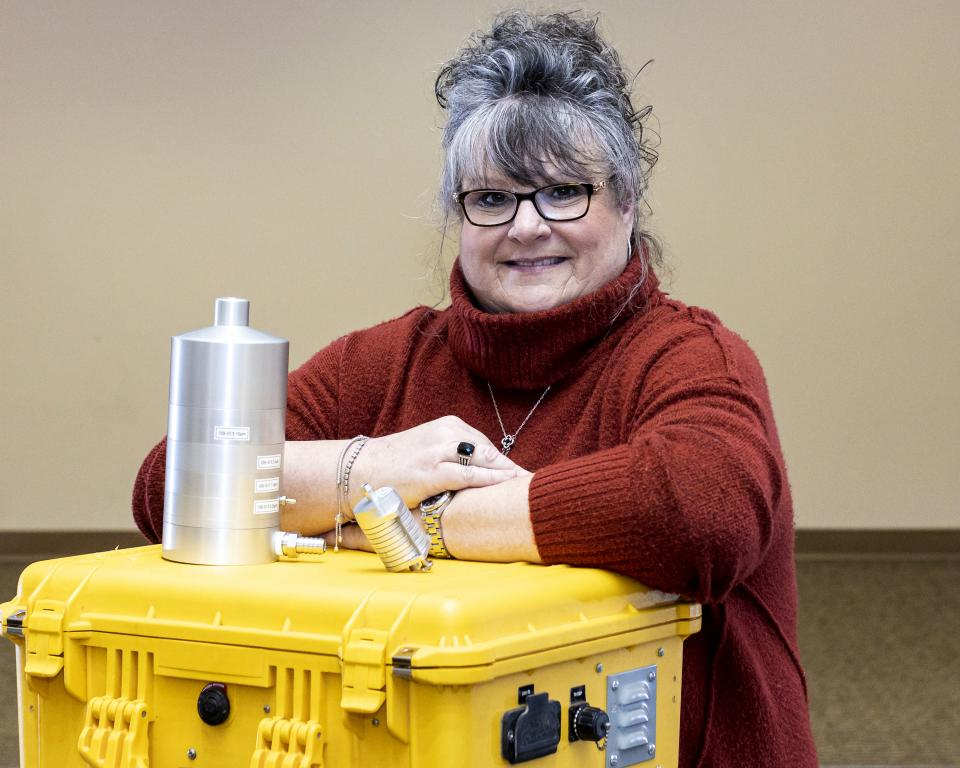
- Cable-Dunlap in 2021
- Education: Western Carolina University; Clemson University
- Scientific career
- Workplaces: Oak Ridge National Laboratory; Savannah River National Laboratory; DuPont
- Thesis: Development of radio frequency powered glow discharge devices for applications in mass spectrometry (1995)

Paula Cable-Dunlap is an American chemist who is an Oak Ridge National Laboratory Corporate Fellow. She develops protocols and analytical techniques for nuclear nonproliferation.

== Early life and education ==
Cable-Dunlap is from North Carolina. She is the daughter of a nurse and was determined to work in medicine as a child. She studied chemistry at Western Carolina University, and was an intern at DuPont, where she became interested in analytical chemistry and worked in the Imaging Systems Department. This internship inspired her lifelong "obsession" with instrumentation. She was a doctoral researcher at Clemson University, where she started to work in nuclear science. Her doctorate developed RF-powered discharge devices for use in mass spectrometry. During her doctorate, she was awarded funding from the United States Department of Energy to characterize glass made from vitrified radioactive waste. Her electrochemical method avoided the need for toxic acids and created a plasma that could be sampled.

== Career ==
In the early 1990s, Cable-Dunlap started working on nuclear nonproliferation. She joined Savannah River National Laboratory in 1992. Following the Gulf War, she started to analyze samples from Iraq to evaluate for nuclear activity. This involved a painstaking process of removing the background material, and eventually resulted in her building an entirely new method centered on ionization. Her invention, a portable aerosol contaminant extractor, was used in the Atacama Desert and aboard the Mars rover.

In 2010, Cable-Dunlap joined Oak Ridge National Laboratory, where she works on nuclear nonproliferation. She analyzes particles from environmental samples (including emanations from seismic vibrations) to identify indicators of clandestine nuclear activity (e.g. smuggling or illegal weapons programs). She helped launch the Ultra Trace Forensic Science Centre, which develops instrumentation to detect the residual chemical signatures of nuclear materials and reactions. To detect nuclear threats at low levels, Cable-Dunlap collects various "nuclear signatures", from effluents (discharges of solid or gas), emanations (sound waves and electromagnetic pulses), and seismic measurements. She uses AI models trained on operational logs to decipher whether or not a particular signal is meaningful. She is responsible for maintaining compliance with the International Atomic Energy Agency, which looks to prevent the spread of nuclear weapons.

Cable-Dunlap was named an Oak Ridge National Laboratory Corporate Fellow in 2024.

== Selected publications ==
- P. Cable-Dunlap; J. J. DeGange; L. S. Nichols; D. C. Duckworth; S. H. Park; G. J. van Berkel (January 2005). "Interface of a particle collector with an on-line electrochemically-modulated separation system for analysis of airborne radioisotopes". Journal of Radioanalytical and Nuclear Chemistry. 263 (1): 177–181. Bibcode:2005JRNC..263..177C. doi:10.1007/s10967-005-0034-0. ISSN 0236-5731. Wikidata Q128834332.
- S. P. LaMont; C. R. Shick; P. Cable-Dunlap; D. J. Fauth; T. R. LaBone (January 2005). "Plutonium determination in bioassay samples using radiochemical thermal ionization mass spectrometry". Journal of Radioanalytical and Nuclear Chemistry. 263 (2): 477–481. Bibcode:2005JRNC..263..477L. doi:10.1007/s10967-005-0078-1. ISSN 0236-5731. Wikidata Q128834338.
- Melissa A. Dempster; W. Clay Davis; R. Kenneth Marcus; Paula R. Cable-Dunlap (2001). "Investigation of the role of hollow cathode (vaporization) temperature on the performance of particle beam-hollow cathode atomic emission spectrometry (PB-HC-AES)". Journal of Analytical Atomic Spectrometry. 16 (2): 115–121. doi:10.1039/b005811o. ISSN 0267-9477. Wikidata Q128834342.
