= Frances Pleasonton =

Particle physicist at the Oak Ridge National Laboratory

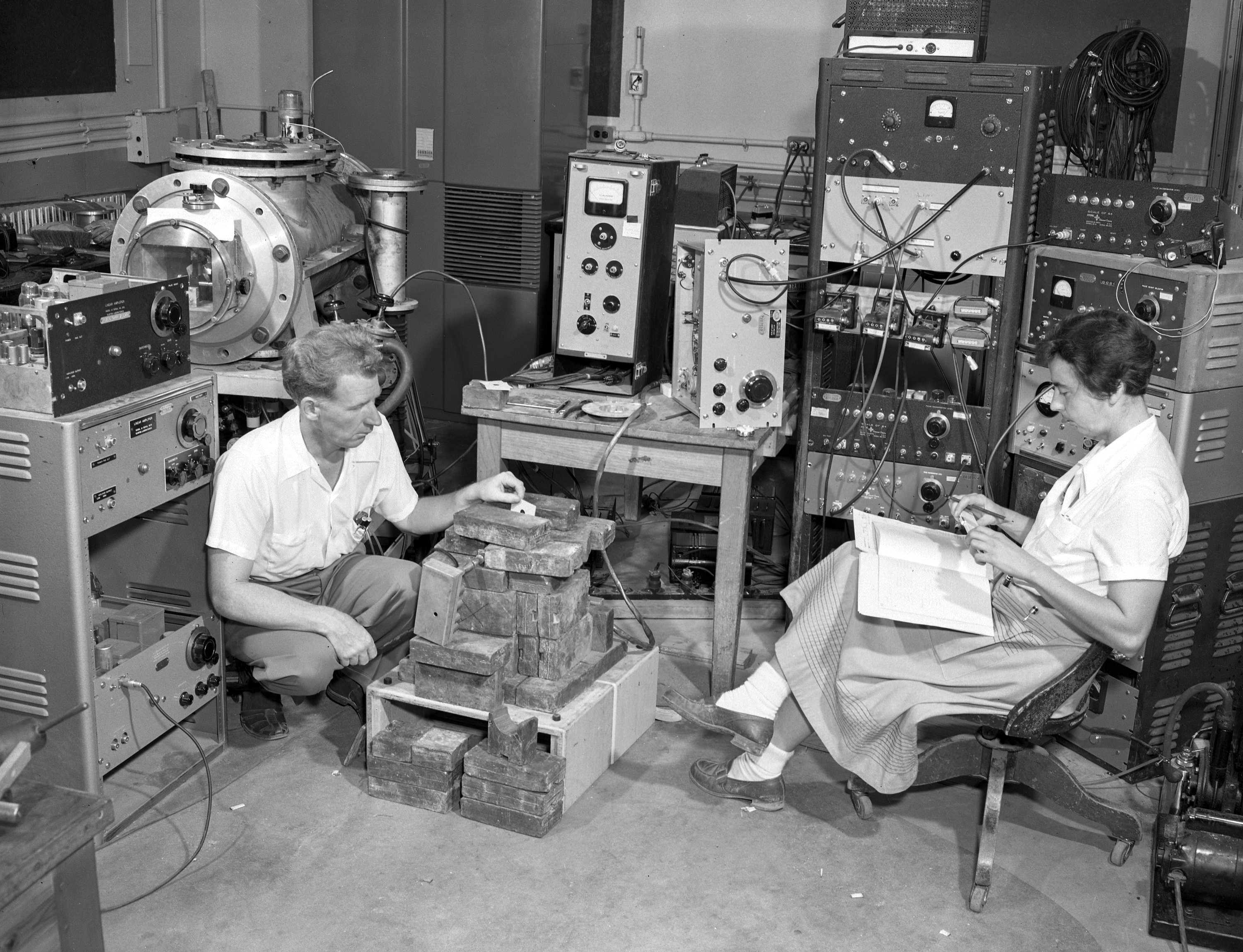
- ORNL’s Arthur Snell and Frances Pleasonton with a device to count neutron decays
- Education: Bryn Mawr College
- Known for: Neutron decay
- Scientific career
- Workplaces: Oak Ridge National Laboratory

Frances Pleasonton (1912–1990) was a Particle Physicist at the Oak Ridge National Laboratory. She was an active teacher and researcher, and a member of the team who first demonstrated neutron decay in 1951.

== Early life and education ==
Pleasonton earned her bachelor's degree at Bryn Mawr College. She was an editor of the Bryn Mawr College yearbook. She went on to teach at Winsor School, Girls Latin School of Chicago and Brearley School. She returned to Bryn Mawr College for her master's degree, working as a warden at Pembroke East, and graduated in 1943. She was demonstrator-elect in physics and took a leave of absence for government service in 1942. During her master's degree she identified the crystal structure of Rochelle salt.

== Research ==
Pleasonton was an active researcher in neutron decay. There were several attempts to measure neutron half-life before the second world war, all of which failed due to the lack of availability of intense neutron sources. Arthur Snell and Leonard Miller built the Oak Ridge Graphite Reactor, which could focus beams of neutrons and allow scientists to observe their decay. They measured the half-life of a neutron in 1951. Pleasonton was supported by the United States Atomic Energy Commission and published broadly. In 1958 they examined the decay of helium-6, Pleasonton and Snell monitoring the directions of neutrinos and electrons. This result confirmed the electron-neutrino theory of beta decay. In 1973 she authored several sections of the report for the Nuclear Regulatory Commission. At Oak Ridge National Laboratory, Pleasonton's laboratory was visited by the Queen of Greece and the King of Jordan. Pleasonton went on to study the ionisation of xenon x-rays.

Pleasonton remained in Tennessee after her retirement from Oak Ridge National Laboratory and was involved in citizens groups to protect the environment.
