= High Flux Isotope Reactor =

Nuclear research reactor in Oak Ridge, Tennessee

Coordinates: 35.9181°N 84.3040°W

The High Flux Isotope Reactor (HFIR) is a nuclear research reactor at Oak Ridge National Laboratory (ORNL) in Oak Ridge, Tennessee, United States. Operating at 85 MW, HFIR is one of the highest flux reactor-based sources of neutrons for condensed matter physics research in the United States, and it has one of the highest steady-state neutron fluxes of any research reactor in the world. The thermal and cold neutrons produced by HFIR are used to study physics, chemistry, materials science, engineering, and biology. The intense neutron flux, constant power density, and constant-length fuel cycles are used by more than 500 researchers each year for neutron scattering research into the fundamental properties of condensed matter. HFIR has about 600 users each year for both scattering and in-core research.

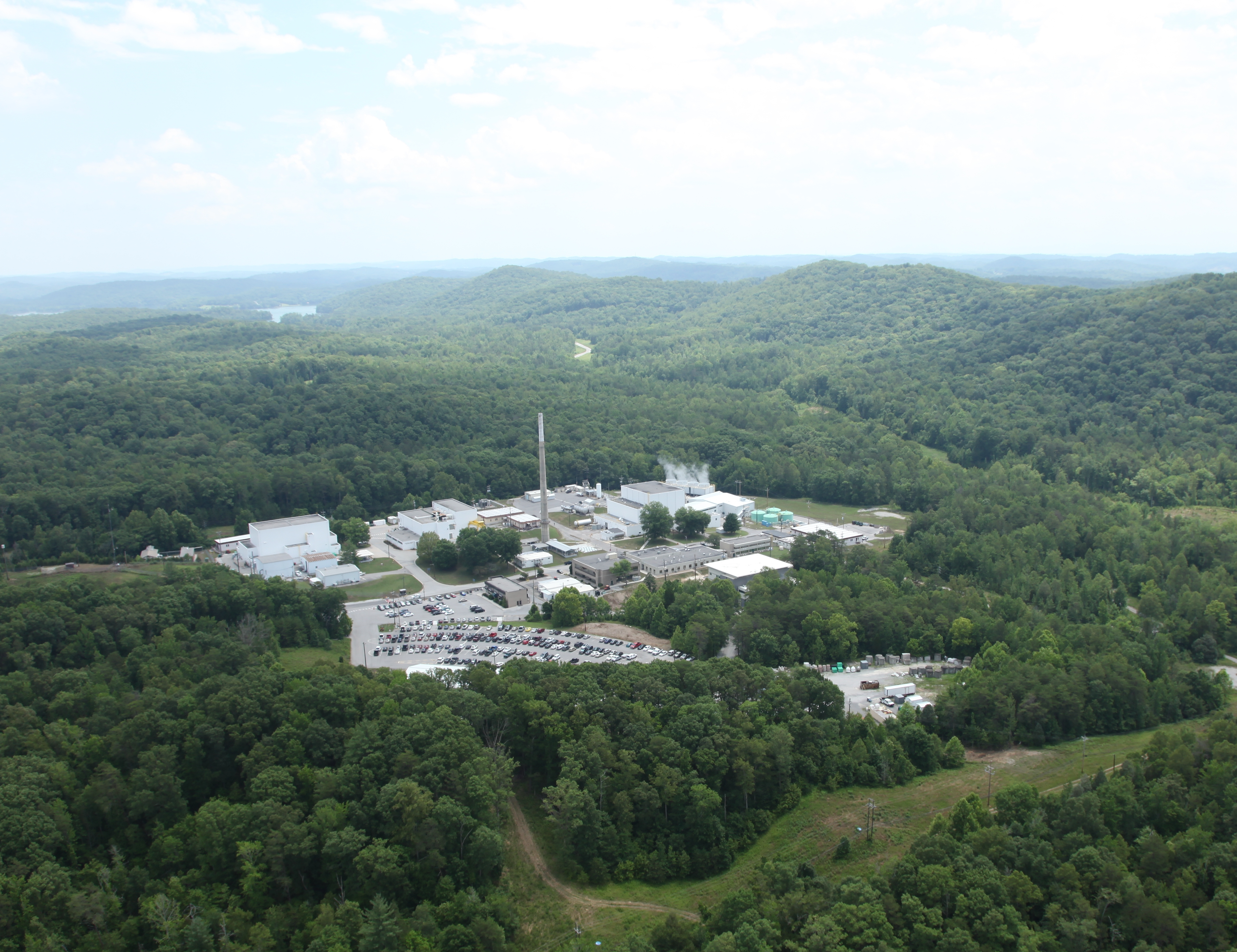
Aerial view of the HFIR

The neutron scattering research facilities at HFIR contain a world-class collection of instruments used for fundamental and applied research on the structure and dynamics of matter. The reactor is used for medical, industrial, and research isotope production; research on severe neutron damage to materials; and neutron activation to examine trace elements in the environment. Additionally, the building houses a gamma irradiation facility that uses spent fuel assemblies and is capable of accommodating high gamma dose experiments.

The next major shutdown for a beryllium reflector replacement is planned for 2028–2029. In parallel, this program foresees in an extension to the cold guide hall to allow for reconfiguring and optimizing of the cold neutron instruments, and provide space for new instruments. HFIR is projected to continue operating through 2040 and beyond.

In November 2007 ORNL officials announced that time-of-flight tests on a newly installed cold source (which uses liquid helium and hydrogen to slow the movement of neutrons) showed better performance than design predictions, equaling or surpassing the previous world record set by the research reactor at the Institut Laue–Langevin in Grenoble, France.

== History ==
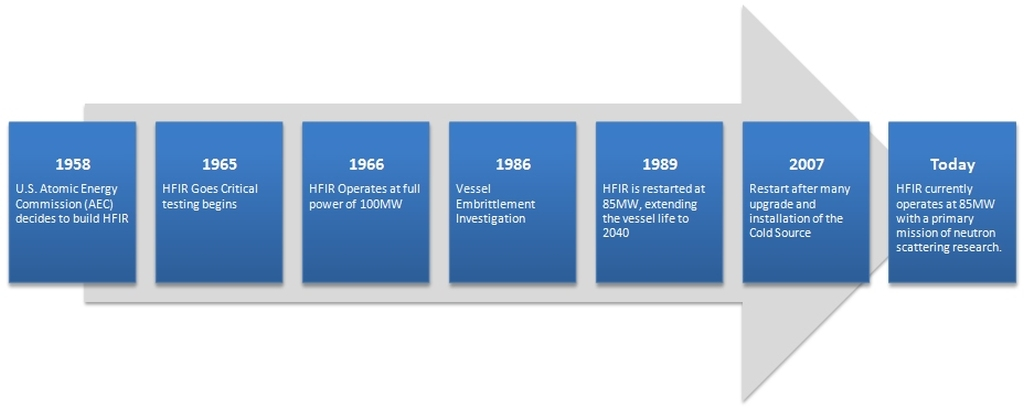
High Flux Isotope Reactor timeline

In January 1958, the U.S. Atomic Energy Commission (AEC) reviewed the status of transuranium isotope production in the United States. By November of that year, the commission decided to build the High Flux Isotope Reactor (HFIR) at Oak Ridge National Laboratory, with a fundamental focus on isotope research and production. Since it first went critical in 1965, the in-core uses for HFIR have broadened to include materials research, fuels research, and fusion energy research, in addition to isotope production and research for medical, nuclear, detector and security purposes.

A low-power testing program was completed in January 1966, and operation cycles at 20, 50, 75, 90, and 100 MW began. From the time it attained its design power of 100 MW in September 1966, a little over five years from the start of its construction, until it was temporarily shut down in late 1986, HFIR achieved a record of operation time unsurpassed by any other reactor in the United States. By December 1973, it had completed its 100th fuel cycle, each lasting ~23 days.

In November 1986, tests on irradiation surveillance specimens indicated that the reactor vessel was being embrittled by neutron irradiation at a rate faster than predicted. HFIR was shut down to allow for extensive review and evaluation of the facility. After thorough reevaluation last over two years, modifications to extend the life of the plant while protecting the integrity of the pressure vessel, and upgrades to management practices, the reactor was restarted at 85 MW. Coincident with physical and procedural improvements were renewed training, safety analysis, and quality assurance activities. Documents were updated, and new ones were generated where necessary. Technical specifications were amended and reformatted to keep abreast of the design changes as they were accepted by the U.S. Department of Energy (DOE), formerly the AEC. The primary coolant pressure and core power were reduced to preserve vessel integrity while maintaining thermal margins, and long-term commitments were made for technological and procedural upgrades.

After a thorough review of many aspects of HFIR operation, the reactor was restarted for fuel cycle 288 on April 18, 1989, to operate initially at very low power levels (8.5 MW) until all operating crews were fully trained and it was possible to operate continuously at higher power. After the April 1989 restart, a further shutdown of nine months occurred due to a question as to procedural adequacy. During this time, oversight of HFIR was transferred to the DOE Office of Nuclear Energy; previously, oversight was through the Office of Energy Research. Following permission by Secretary of Energy James D. Watkins to resume startup operation in January 1990, full power was reached on May 18, 1990. Ongoing programs have been established for procedural and technological upgrade of the HFIR during its operating life.

In 2007, HFIR completed the most dramatic transformation in its 40-year history. During a shutdown of more than a year, the facility was refurbished and new instruments were installed, including a cold neutron source. When the reactor was restarted, it attained its full power of 85 MW within a couple of days, and experiments resumed within a week. Improvements and upgrades include an overhaul of the reactor structure for reliable, sustained operation; significant upgrading of the eight thermal-neutron spectrometers in the beam room; new computer system controls; installation of the liquid hydrogen cold source; and a new cold neutron guide hall. The upgraded HFIR will eventually house 15 instruments, including 7 for research using cold neutrons.

A video about a test reactor inside the ORNL from the United States Department of Energy.

Although HFIR's main mission is now neutron scattering research, one of its original primary purposes was the production of californium-252 and other transuranium isotopes for research, industrial, and medical applications. HFIR is the western world's sole supplier of californium-252, an isotope with uses such as cancer therapy and detection of pollutants in the environment and explosives in luggage.

== Technical description ==
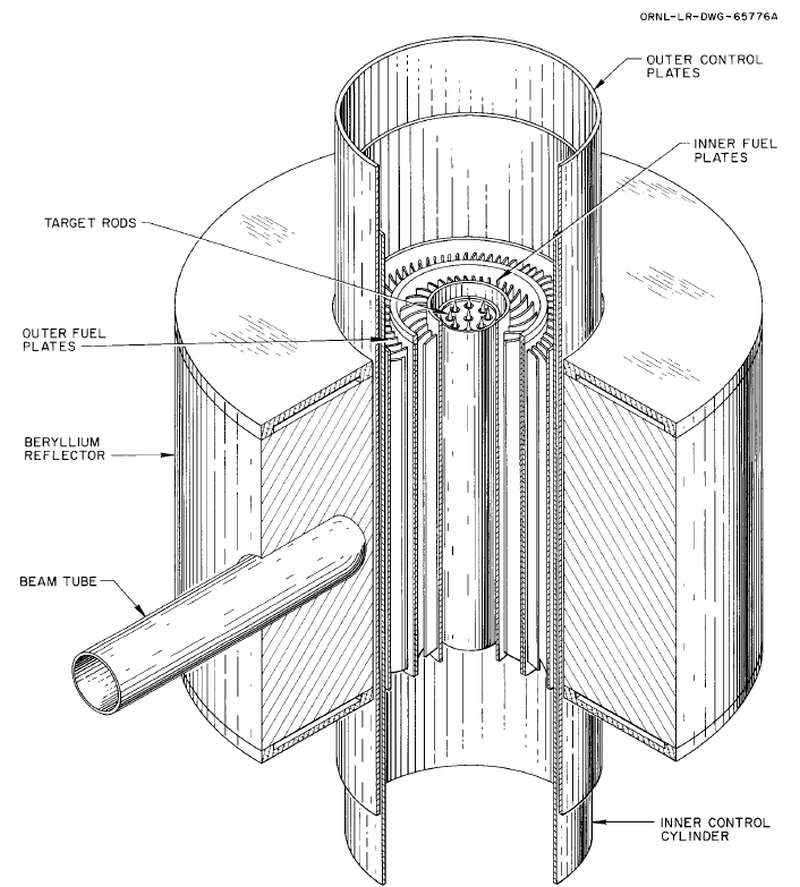
Simplified sketch of the core

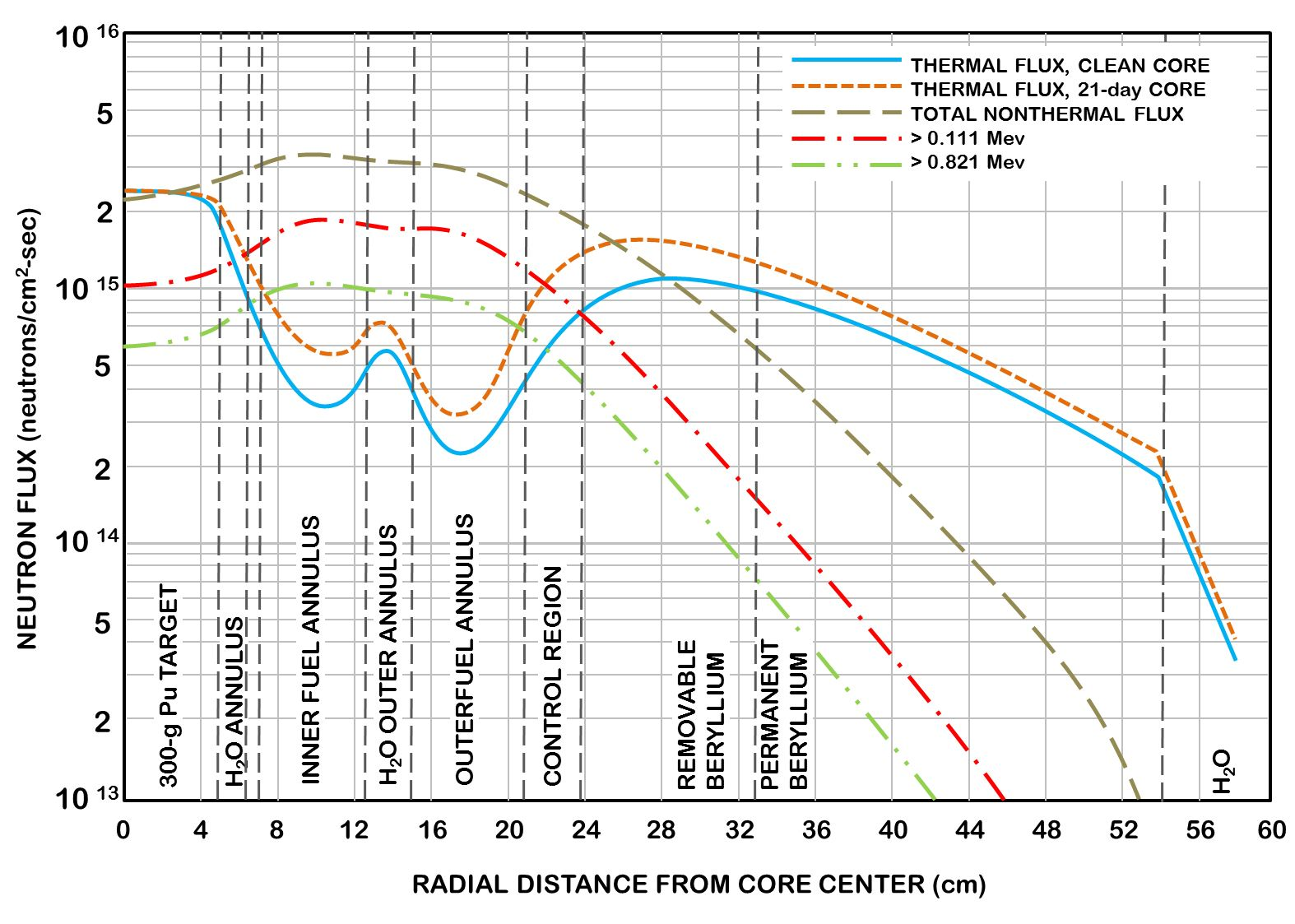
85 MW neutron flux graph for the High Flux Isotope Reactor

HFIR is a beryllium-reflected, light-water-cooled and -moderated, flux-trap type reactor that uses highly enriched uranium fuel. The preliminary conceptual design of the reactor was based on the "flux trap" principle, where the reactor core consists of an annular region of fuel surrounding an unfueled moderating region or "island". Such configuration permits fast neutrons leaking from the fuel to be moderated in the island and so gives a region of very high thermal-neutron flux at the center of the island. This reservoir of thermalized neutrons is "trapped" within the reactor, making it available for isotope production. The large flux of neutrons in the reflector outside the fuel of such a reactor may be tapped by extending empty "beam" tubes into the reflector, allowing neutrons to be beamed into experiments outside the reactor shielding. A variety of holes in the reflector may be provided in which to irradiate materials for experiments or isotope production.

The original mission of HFIR was the production of transplutonium isotopes. However, the original designers included many other experiment facilities, and several others have been added since then. Experiment facilities available include:

1. Four horizontal beam tubes, which originate in the beryllium reflector.
2. The hydraulic tube irradiation facility, in the very high flux region of the flux trap, which allows insertion and removal of samples while the reactor is running.
3. 30 target positions in the flux trap, which normally contain transplutonic production rods but which can be used for irradiation of other experiments (two of these positions can accommodate instrumented targets).
4. Six peripheral target positions at the outer edge of the flux trap
5. Many vertical irradiation facilities of various sizes, throughout the beryllium reflector
6. Two pneumatic tube facilities in the beryllium reflector, which allow for insertion and removal of samples while the reactor is running for neutron activation analysis
7. Two slant access facilities, called "engineering facilities", on the outer edge of the beryllium reflector
8. Spent fuel assemblies are used to provide a gamma irradiation facility in the reactor pool.

=== Reactor core assembly ===
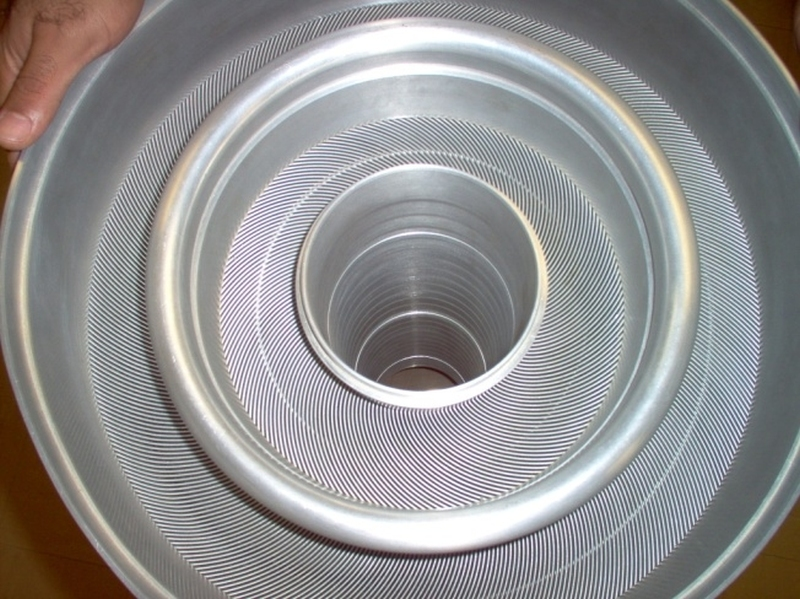
Fuel assembly

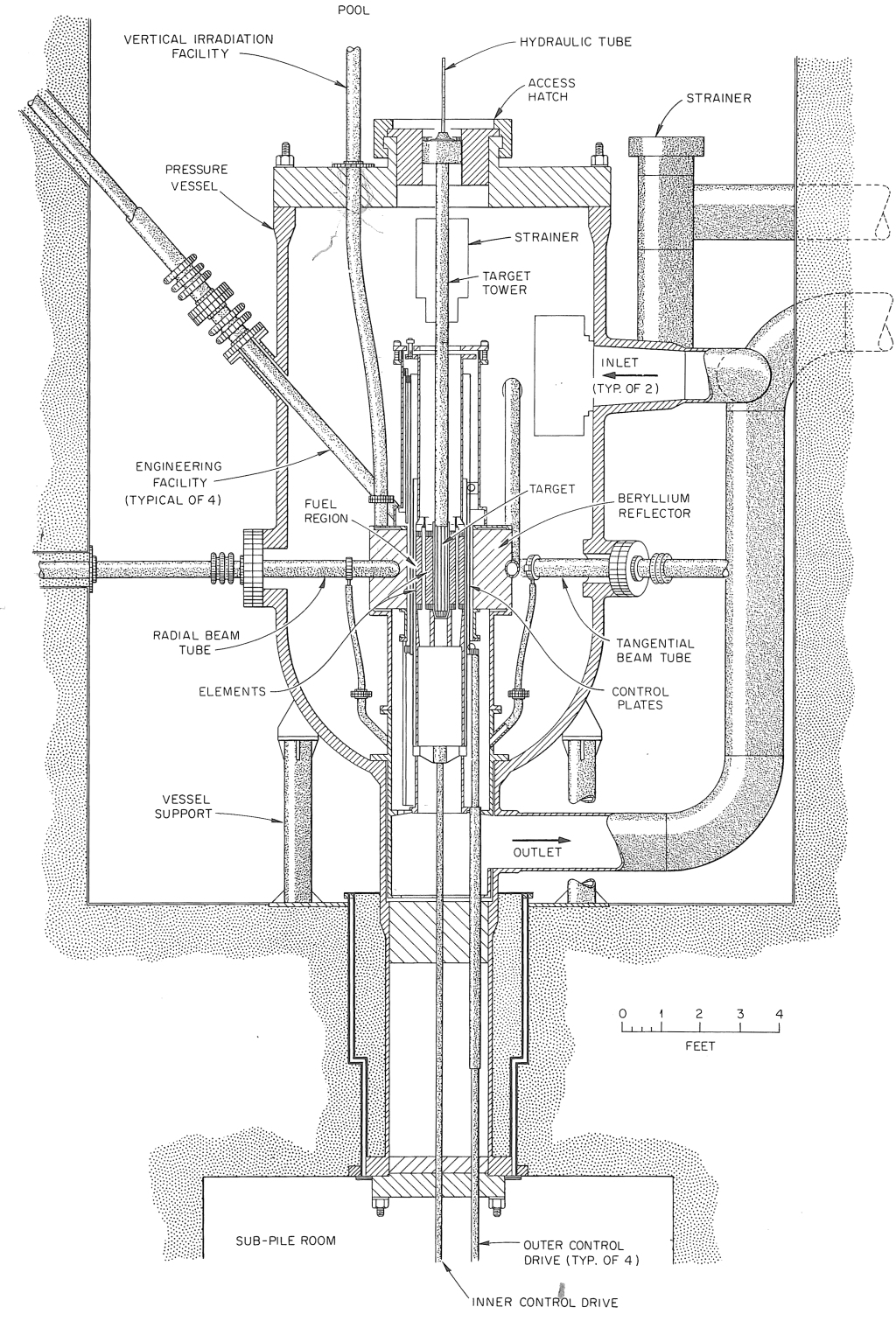
Vertical cross section

The reactor core assembly is in an 8-ft (2.44-m)-diameter pressure vessel in a pool of water. The top of the pressure vessel is 17 ft (5.2 m) below the pool surface. The control plate drive mechanisms are in a sub-pile room beneath the pressure vessel. These features give the necessary shielding for working above the reactor core and greatly facilitate access to the pressure vessel, core, and reflector regions.

The reactor core is cylindrical, about 2 ft (0.61 m) high and 15 inches (380 mm) in diameter. A 5-in. (12.70-cm)-diameter hole, the "flux trap," forms the center of the core. The target is typically loaded with curium-244 and other transplutonic isotopes and is positioned on the reactor vertical axis within the flux trap. The fuel region is made of two concentric fuel elements. The inner element contains 171 fuel plates; the outer element has 369 plates. The fuel plates are curved in the shape of an involute, providing constant coolant channel width. The fuel (93% ^{235}U enriched U_{3}O_{8}-Al cermet) is non-uniformly distributed along the arc of the involute to minimize the radial peak-to-average power density ratio. A burnable nuclear poison (boron-10) is included in the inner fuel element primarily to flatten the radial flux peak providing a longer cycle for each fuel element. Average core lifetime with typical experiment loading is ~23 days at 85 MW.

The fuel region is surrounded by a concentric ring of beryllium reflector ~1 ft (0.3 m) thick. This in turn is subdivided into three regions: the removable reflector, the semi-permanent reflector, and the permanent reflector. The beryllium is surrounded by a water reflector of effectively infinite thickness. In the axial direction, the reactor is reflected by water. The control plates, in the form of two thin, nuclear poison-bearing concentric cylinders, are in an annular region between the outer fuel element and the beryllium reflector. These plates are driven in opposite directions to open and close a window at the core mid-plane. Reactivity is increased by downward motion of the inner cylinder and upward motion of the four outer quadrant plates. The inner cylinder is used for shimming and power regulation and has no fast safety function. The outer control cylinder consists of four separate quadrant plates, each having an independent drive and safety release mechanism. All control plates have three axial regions of different neutron poison content designed to minimize the axial peak-to-average power-density ratio throughout the core lifetime. Any single quadrant plate or cylinder is capable of shutting down the reactor.

The reactor instrumentation and control system design reflects emphasis on continuity of and safety of operations. Three independent safety channels are arranged in a coincidence system that requires agreement of two of the three for safety shutdowns. This feature is complemented by an extensive "on-line" testing system that permits the safety function of any one channel to be tested any time during operation. Additionally, three independent automatic control channels are arrayed so that failure of one channel will not significantly disturb operation. All these factors contribute to continuity of operation in HFIR.

The primary coolant enters the pressure vessel through two 16-in. (40.64-cm)-diameter pipes above the core, passes through the core, and exits through an 18-in. (45.72-cm)-diameter pipe beneath the core. The flow rate is ~16,000 gpm (1 m^{3}/s), of which about 13,000 gpm (0.82 m^{3}/s) flows through the fuel region. The rest flows through the target, reflector, and control regions. The system is designed to operate at a nominal inlet pressure of 468 psi (3.3 million Pa). Under these conditions the inlet coolant temperature is 120 °F (49 °C), the corresponding exit temperature is 156 °F (69 °C), and the pressure drop through the core is ~110 psi (7.6×10^{5} Pa).

From the reactor, the coolant flow is distributed to three of four identical heat exchanger and circulation pump combinations, each in a separate cell adjacent to the reactor and storage pools. Each cell also contains a letdown valve that controls primary coolant pressure. A secondary coolant system removes heat from the primary system and transfers it to the atmosphere by passing water over a four-cell induced-draft cooling tower.

A fuel cycle for HFIR normally consists of full-power operation at 85 MW for 21-23 days (depending on experiment and radioisotope load in the reactor), then an end-of-cycle outage for refueling. Such refueling outages vary as required to allow control plate replacement, calibrations, maintenance, and inspections. Experiment insertion and removal may be done during any end-of-cycle outage. Interruption of a fuel cycle for experiment installation or removal is strongly discouraged to avoid impact on other experiments and neutron scattering.

=== Horizontal beam tubes ===
The reactor has four horizontal beam tubes which supply the neutrons to instruments used by the Center for Neutron Scattering.

==== HB-1 and HB-3 ====
The HB-1 and HB-3 thermal neutron beam tube designs are identical except for length. Both are situated tangential to the reactor core so that the tubes point at reflector material and do not point directly at the fuel. An internal collimator is installed at the outboard end. This collimator is made of carbon steel and plated with nickel. The collimator provides a 2.75-by-5.5-inch (70 by 140 mm) rectangular aperture.

A rotary shutter is located outboard of each of these beam tubes. The shutter is fabricated using carbon steel and high-density concrete. The purpose of the shutter is to provide shielding when the neutron beam is not required. High-density concrete blocks are placed around the shutter to prevent streaming.

==== HB-2 ====
The HB-2 thermal neutron beam tube is situated radially relative to the reactor core, pointed directly at the fuel. Two beryllium inserts are installed in the spherical tip of the beam tube to maximize thermal neutron flux within the critical acceptance angle of the neutron scattering experiment equipment. The beam tube cavity outboard of the reactor vessel has a rectangular cross-section that converges vertically and diverges horizontally such that the aperture at the outboard window is a rectangle nominally 6-in tall by 10-in wide.

A carbon steel collimator assembly is located just outboard of the beam tube window. This collimator assembly provides further neutron-beam collimation and houses a fast-neutron filter to increase the signal-to-noise ratio at the neutron scattering instruments. A rotary shutter is located outboard of the outer collimator assembly.

==== HB-4 ====
The HB-4 cold neutron source beam tube is situated tangential to the reactor core so that the tube points at reflector material and does not point directly at the fuel. A vacuum tube fits closely inside in-vessel section of the HB-4 beam tube all the way to the spherical end. The vacuum tube contains and insulates a hydrogen moderator vessel and its associated tubing. The moderator vessel contains supercritical hydrogen at 17 K (nominal). Thermal neutrons scattered into the moderator vessel from the reflector are scattered and cooled by the hydrogen so that the 4-12 Å neutrons scattered down the tube are maximized.

An internal collimator is installed in the outboard end of the HB-4 tube. The collimator provides three rectangular apertures. The outboard dimensions of the apertures are 1.61-by-4.33-inch (41 by 110 mm); 2.17-by-3.65-inch (55 by 93 mm); and 1.78-by-4.33-inch (45 by 110 mm). Outboard of the outer collimator assembly is a rotary shutter. The shutter has provisions for routing the cryogenic hydrogen transfer line, gaseous helium, and vacuum piping needed to support the cold source.

== In-core experiment facilities ==
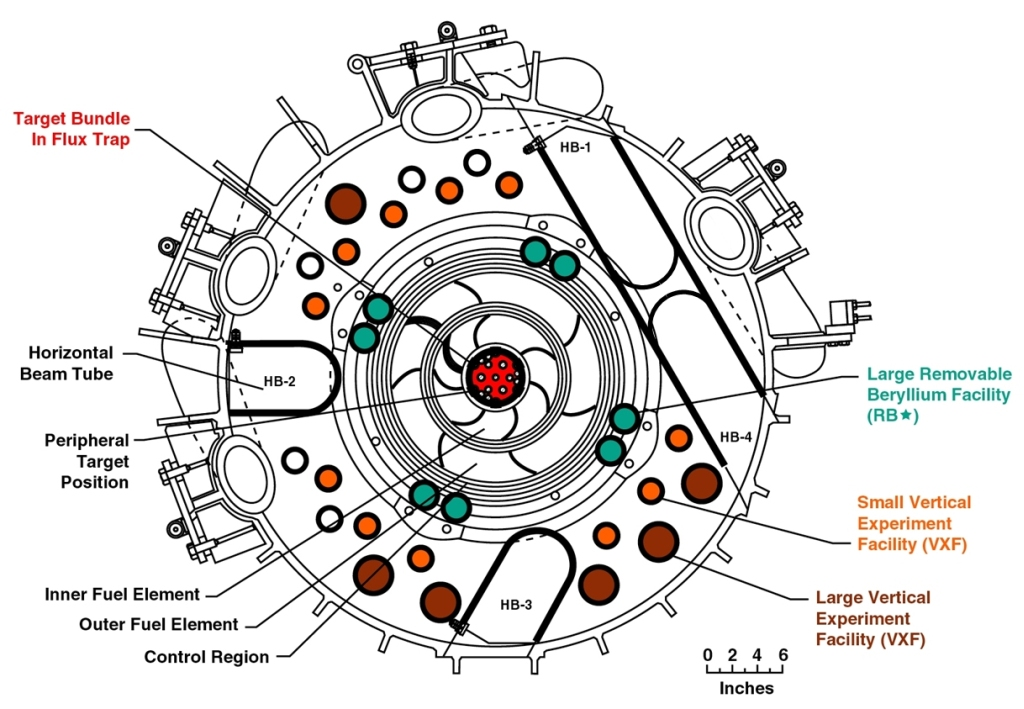
Reactor core cross section

=== Flux trap positions ===
==== Hydraulic tube ====
The hydraulic tube facility provides the ability to irradiate materials for durations less than the standard ~23 day HFIR fuel cycle, which is ideal for the production of short half-life medical isotopes that require retrieval on demand. The system consists of the necessary piping, valves, and instrumentation to shuttle a set of 2 1/2-inch (64 mm) long aluminum capsules (called rabbits) between the capsule loading station and the flux trap in the reactor core. The capsule loading station is in the storage pool adjacent to the reactor vessel pool. A full facility load consists of nine vertically stacked capsules.

Normally, heat flux from neutron and gamma heating at the surface of the capsule is limited to 74,000 Btu/h-ft^{2} (2.3×10^{5} W/m^{2}). Also, the neutron poison content of the facility load is limited such that the reactor cannot be tripped by a significant reactivity change upon insertion and removal of the samples.

==== Target positions ====
Thirty-one target positions are provided in the flux trap. These positions were originally designed to be occupied by target rods used for the production of transplutonium elements; however, other experiments can be irradiated in any of these positions. A similar target capsule configuration can be used in many applications. A third type of target is designed to house up to nine 2-inch-long isotope or materials irradiation capsules that are similar to the rabbit facility capsules. The use of this type of irradiation capsule simplifies fabrication, shipping, and post-irradiation processing which translates to a cost savings for the experimenter.

Target irradiation capsules of each type must be designed so that they can be adequately cooled by the coolant flow available outside the target-rod shrouds. Excessive neutron poison loads in experiments in target positions are discouraged because of their adverse effects on both transplutonic isotope production rates and fuel cycle length. Such experiments require careful coordination to ensure minimal effects on adjacent experiments, fuel cycle length, and neutron scattering beam brightness.

==== Peripheral target positions ====
Six peripheral target positions (PTPs) are provided for experiments at the outer radial edge of the flux trap. Fast-neutron fluxes in these positions are the highest available to experiments in the reactor, though a steep radial gradient in the thermal-neutron flux exists at this location. Like the target positions, a type of PTP capsule is available that houses up to nine 2-inch (51 mm) long isotope or materials irradiation capsules that are similar to the rabbit facility capsules. Use of this type of irradiation capsule simplifies fabrication, shipping, and post-irradiation processing which translates to a cost savings for the experimenter.

PTP irradiation capsules of each type must be designed such that they can be adequately cooled by the coolant flow available. Typical experiments contain a neutron poison load equivalent to that associated with 200 grams (7.1 oz) of aluminum and 35 grams (1.2 oz) of stainless steel distributed uniformly over a 20-inch (510 mm) length.

=== Beryllium reflectors ===
Eight large diameter irradiation positions are located in the removable beryllium (RB) near the control region. These facilities are designated as RB-1A and -1B, RB-3A and -3B, RB-5A and -5B, and RB-7A and -7B. These are generally referred to as the RB* positions. The vertical centerline of these facilities is 10.75 in. (27.31 cm) from the vertical centerline of the reactor and they are lined with a permanent aluminum liner having an inside diameter of 1.811 in. (4.6 cm). These facilities are designed for either instrumented or non-instrumented experiments. The instrumented capsule design can also employ sweep or cooling gases as necessary. Instrument leads and access tubes are accommodated through penetrations in the upper shroud flange and through special penetrations in the pressure vessel hatch. When not in use, these facilities contain beryllium or aluminum plugs. Because of their close proximity to the fuel, RB* experiments are carefully reviewed with respect to their neutron poison content, which is limited because of its effect on fuel element power distribution and fuel cycle length. These positions can accommodate (i.e., shielded) experiments, making them well suited for fusion materials irradiation.

Uses for the RB* facilities have included production of radioisotopes; high-temperature gas-cooled reactor irradiations; and irradiation of candidate fusion reactor materials. The latter type of experiment requires fast neutron flux. A significant fast flux is present in addition to the thermal flux. For this application the capsules are placed in a liner containing a thermal neutron poison for spectral-tailoring.

In the RB near the control region are four small diameter irradiation positions. These facilities are designated RB-2, RB-4, RB-6, and RB-8. The vertical centerline of these facilities is 10.37 in. (26.35 cm) from the vertical centerline of the reactor and has an inside diameter of 0.5 in. (1.27 cm). The small RB positions do not have an aluminum liner like the RB* facilities. When not in use, these positions contain beryllium plugs. These facilities have been mainly used for producing radioisotopes.

=== Control-rod access plug ===
In the semi-permanent reflector are eight 0.5-in. (1.27-cm) diameter irradiation positions. The semi-permanent reflector is made up of eight separate pieces of beryllium, four of which are called control-rod access plugs. Each control-rod access plug contains two unlined irradiation facilities, designated CR-1 through CR-8. Each of these facilities accommodates an experiment capsule similar to those used in the small removable beryllium facilities. The vertical centerlines of all control-rod access plug irradiation facilities are located 12.68 in. (32.2 cm) from the vertical centerline of the reactor. Only non-instrumented experiments can be irradiated in these facilities. When not in use, these facilities contain beryllium plugs. A pressure drop of 10 psi (6.89×10^{4} Pa) at full system flow is available to give primary system coolant flow for cooling experiments.

=== Vertical experiment facilities ===
Sixteen irradiation positions in the permanent reflector are called the small vertical experiment facilities (VXF). Each of these facilities has a permanent aluminum liner with an inside diameter of 1.584 in. (4.02 cm). The facilities are located concentric with the core on two circles of radii 15.43 in. (39.2 cm) and 17.36 in. (44.1 cm), respectively. Those on the inner circle (11 in all) are called inner small VXFs. Those on the outer circle (five in all) are called outer small VXFs. Normally, non-instrumented experiments are irradiated in these facilities. VXF-7 is dedicated to one of the pneumatic irradiation facilities that supports the Neutron Activation Analysis Laboratory and is unavailable for other use. A pressure drop of ~100 psi (6.89×10^{5} Pa) at full system flow is available to provide primary system coolant flow for cooling experiments. When not in use, these facilities may contain a beryllium or aluminum plug or a flow-regulating orifice and no plug.

Large neutron poison loads in these facilities are of no particular concern for fuel element power distribution perturbations or effects on fuel cycle length due to their distance from the core; however, experiments are carefully reviewed with respect to their neutron poison content, which is limited to minimize their effect on adjacent neutron scattering beam tubes.

Six irradiation positions in the permanent reflector, are called the large vertical experiment facilities. These facilities are similar in all respects (as to characteristics and capabilities) to the small vertical experiment facilities described in the preceding section except for location and size. The aluminum liners in the large VXFs have an inside diameter of 2.834 in. (7.20 cm), and the facilities are located concentric with the core on a circle of radius 18.23 in. (46.3 cm). When not in use, these facilities contain beryllium or aluminum plugs. Large neutron poison loads in these facilities are of no particular concern for fuel element power distribution perturbations or effects on fuel cycle length because of their distance from the core.

=== Slant engineering ===
Provision has been made for installation of up to two engineering facilities to give additional positions for experiments. These facilities consist of 4-in. (10.16-cm)-O.D. tubes that are inclined upward 49° from the horizontal. The inner ends of the tubes terminate at the outer periphery of the beryllium. The upper ends of the tubes terminate at the outer face of the pool wall in an experiment room one floor above the main beam room. One of the engineering facilities houses the PT-2 pneumatic tube, which was installed in 1986.

== Gamma Irradiation Facility ==
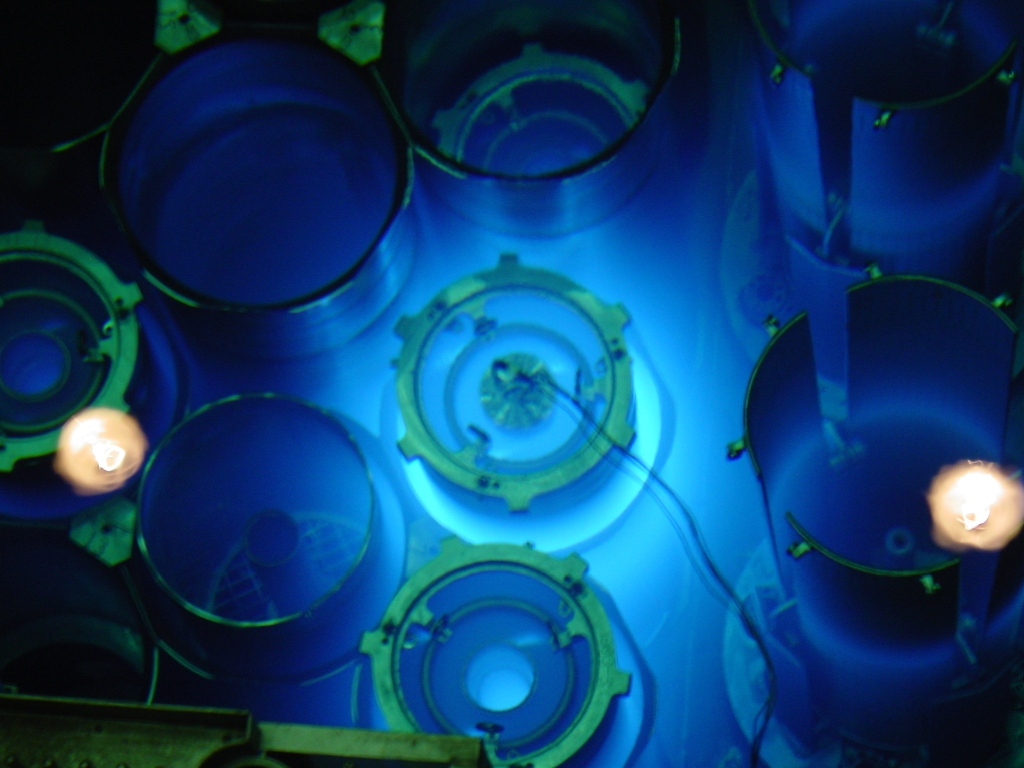
Spent fuel elements from the reactor displaying Cherenkov radiation

=== Overview ===
The HFIR Gamma Irradiation Facility is an experiment facility in HFIR designed to irradiate materials with gamma radiation from the spent fuel elements in the HFIR loading station in the clean pool. The Gamma Irradiation Facility Chamber is a stainless steel chamber made of 0.065 wall thickness tubing to maximize the internal dimensions of chamber to accommodate as large as possible samples and still fit inside the cadmium post of the spent fuel loading station positions. The interior chamber is about 3 1/4-inch (83 mm) inside diameter and will accommodate samples up to 25 inches (640 mm) long.

There are two configurations for the chamber assembly; the only difference is the plugs. The uninstrumented configuration has a top plug which is used for installation of the samples and to support the inert gas lines and maintain a leak-tight environment while underwater. The instrumented configuration has a chamber extension above the chamber and an "umbilical" to permit inert gas lines, electrical cables and instrumentation cables for an instrumented experiment to connect with heater controls and instrumentation testing equipment in the experiment room.

An inert gas control panel in the experiment room is needed to provide inert gas flow and pressure relief to the chamber. Inert gas pressure is maintained at ~15 psi to assure any leakage from the chamber would be from the chamber to the pool and not water in leakage.

Samples in the chamber may be supported from the bottom of the chamber or from the plug (uninstrumented configuration only).

=== Radiation dose rates and accumulated doses ===
Characterization of the inside surface of the chamber has been done and gamma dose rates at this location have been confirmed. Gamma dose rates up to 1.8E+08 can be provided. Selection of an appropriate spent fuel element can provide essentially any required dose rate. Due to secondary reactions within sample and holder materials in the chamber, they have created neutronic models to estimate the actual dose rates to the samples in different holders and at different locations within the chamber. The peak dose rates are near the vertical center of the chamber and at the horizontal centerline of the chamber. There is a near symmetrical distribution of the dose rate from top to bottom of the chamber. HFIR personnel are available to help in the design of sample holders by the user to achieve the required accumulated doses and dose rates. Temperature of the samples from the required dose rate can be estimated.

=== Temperatures ===
Recent irradiations have shown that temperatures from the gamma heating can be very high, over 500 °F (260 °C) in fresh spent fuel elements. Location of the samples near the chamber wall or holder design to transfer heat to the chamber wall can be used to lower the sample temperature. Selection of a more decayed spent fuel element with a lower dose rate may be necessary if temperature limits are a concern.

The minimum temperatures maintained are about 100 °F (38 °C) (the clean pool water temperature). The use of electric heating elements and/or inert gas (argon or helium) flooding allow for controlled temperatures above 100 °F (38 °C).

== Neutron activation analysis ==
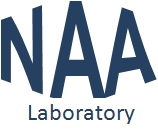

Neutron activation analysis (NAA) is a powerful analytical technique used to probe the elemental makeup of a wide variety of materials. NAA is very sensitive and accurate and is generally done nondestructively. Samples are bombarded with neutrons, and the emissions from the radioisotopes produced are analyzed to determine both their number and identity. Several university, government, and industrial labs, both domestic and abroad, use NAA to study forensic evidence, lunar and meteoritic materials, advanced materials, and high purity materials. NAA is free of classical "matrix" effects and is capable of very precise measurements with detection limits commonly in fractions of PPM.

Reactor-based NAA was first done at the X-10 Graphite Reactor. The PT-1 facility was installed at HFIR in 1970 and was upgraded in 1987 when the PT-2 facility was added. Both facilities end in the permanent beryllium reflector portion of the reactor and facilitate the transfer of samples to and from the reactor. PT-1 has the highest thermal neutron flux in the western world and offers many advantages in sensitivity for ultra-trace level determinations and for limited isotope production. The PT-2 facility offers a highly thermalized flux coupled with delayed neutron counting, giving the ability to measure very low quantities of fissile materials in minutes.

=== Nuclear nonproliferation ===
Delayed neutron analysis can be used for accurate screening of various materials for fissile content. The determination requires only six minutes and has a 15-picogram detection limit. Samples of smears, vegetation, soil, rock, plastics, wood, metal, and sand are equally amenable to delayed neutron analysis. This tool facilitates International Atomic Energy Agency (IAEA) efforts to establish wide area monitoring and enables individual inspectors to get large numbers of samples in the hopes of finding required evidence. By screening those samples, the very high costs of destructive analysis are needed only for samples deemed interesting. Delayed neutron analysis is becoming increasingly useful for these studies.

A recent application involves irradiation of programmable memory devices that have been coated with a small amount of a fissile isotope. The fissions from irradiation may be tracked spatially by comparing the values in memory with those assigned to memory initially; areas of differences are attributed to damage caused by the fission events. This work may help efforts to analyze microscopic particles that may contain evidence of undeclared nuclear activities by finding such particles.

=== Environmental ===
NAA is well suited for determining about two-thirds of known elements in geological and biological materials. Several projects were facilitated by NAA that otherwise would be very challenging or impossible. Mercury contamination in the Oak Ridge area, baseline soil levels for many elements, and uranium isotope ratio in Oak Ridge area soils and vegetation have all been accomplished on medium and large scale. The chemistry and history of the Moon have been elucidated by NAA, and many different meteorites have been studied. Trace elements were determined in animal bone and tissue for efforts to understand effects of habitat pollution. The fate of the dinosaurs was investigated by analyzing iridium in fossilized bone dated near in time to known major meteorite impacts. Recently, bioremediation strategies have been examined and rates of absorption of heavy elements have been determined in indigenous plants and animals.

=== Forensics ===
Since its inception, NAA has been a tool for forensic trace element investigations. Bullet lead and jacket, paint, brass, plastic, hair, and many other materials are often of interest for criminal investigation. At ORNL, investigations involving presidents Kennedy and Taylor, and homicide investigations have been done.

=== Isotope production ===
Small amounts of various isotopes have been synthesized in the PT-1 facility over the years. Tracers for animal studies, radiolabeled pharmaceuticals, cancer treatment trial sources, and sources in support of materials studies have been prepared cheaply. PT-1 represents the quickest access to the reactor and often the lowest cost for low-quantity isotope production. Recently, gamma densitometry sources made of ^{169}Yb were prepared and may be prepared on-demand for the foreseeable future.

=== Ultra-trace metrology ===
Many elements may be easily and precisely measured at parts-per-trillion level using NAA. ORNL has helped private corporations with applied research into properties of fiber optic starting materials and their relationship to trace element concentration and found that breakage frequency depends on the concentration of certain elements. Diamond and diamond films have been analyzed for ultra-trace impurities and ORNL's determinations were the first to be reported on bulk synthetic diamond. ORNL has also determined uranium and thorium in organic scintillator at the 1e-15 g/g level. The scintillator is to be used in a neutrino detection project in Japan that requires material as free from natural radioactivity as possible.

=== Materials irradiation ===
The combined effects of neutron and gamma radiation on materials are of interest for advanced materials research, fusion energy research, and for production of hardened components and systems. A recent example is the dose response investigation of dichroic mirror ceramic materials for the fusion energy research program. The PT-1 and PT-2 facilities are well suited to fill the niche between the very high fluxes in the HFIR target region and the much lower ones in the beam tubes.
