= Sammy Lee (scientist) =

British biologist (1958–2012)

Sammy Lee (born Samuel Lee, 1958 – 21 July 2012) was an English expert on fertility and in vitro fertilisation

He was a hospital scientific consultant and was the chief scientist at the Wellington IVF programme. His book Counselling in Male Infertility was published in 1996; he contributed to a number of newspaper articles and appeared on several current affairs television programmes. He was the "inspiration" for Anthony Ling, the character in the novel One Life by Rebecca Frayn (Simon & Schuster 2006, ISBN 0-7432-6876-8), after the author herself sought Lee's help for IVF treatment.

In 2010, Willing to Die for It, Lee's biography by Frances Lynn, was published by Murray Print.

== Research ==
Lee's interests lay in the field of stem cell biology and regenerative medicine. He was a visiting professor at the University College London where he collaborated with groups in the university's anatomy department examining the potential of bone marrow derived mesenchymal stem cells to give rise to neuronal/glial lineages in response to various growth factors and tissue culture manipulations. He also taught ethics of biomedicine at University College London.

In addition, he was interested in tissue engineering and teaching ethics in reproduction. He was attached to the Jessen-Mirsky laboratory and was studying remyelination. Lee had ethical committee approval in Brazil for creating artificial gametes from umbilical cord blood derived stem cells, with the expectation that these could be used to overcome infertility.

== Biography ==
Lee originally researched his Ph.D. at UCL under the supervision of Professor Ricardo Miledi FRS in the school of Sir Bernard Katz. Lee was also a signatory to a memento presented to Sir Bernard Katz on his 80th birthday from bona fide members of the school-occasion when the phrase "School of Katz" was coined.

Lee first published research in Neuroscience during the 1980s (from the biophysics department at UCL), having worked on nerve muscle interaction ranging from examining TTX-resistant action potentials in denervated muscle to studying cholinesterase activity in dissociated adult muscle fibres following up on the work first done in the same department by Bill Betz and Bert Sakmann. Lee changed his focus to embryos, when he realised that many of the questions framed by his neuroscience research were rooted in the matter of differentiation. The ultimate undifferentiated cell is the fertilised egg. This led Lee to work on gap junctions in early mammalian embryos (in the Anatomy & Embryology department at UCL), where work with Anne Warner FRS and Anne McLaren DBE FRS produced new information on factors affecting communication between cells and their developmental potential.

Lee became a clinical embryologist in 1985, when working with the gynaecologist Ian Craft he directed the IVF laboratory at the Wellington Hospital in London, then one of the largest units in the world. Consultancy work with the UK division of Ares Serono (1986–1994) also involved work with the Bourn Hallam Group, which Patrick Steptoe and Bob Edwards had set up after Louise Brown's birth. From 1995 to 2002 he was based at the Portland Hospital for Women & Children.

Lee latterly became based again at University College London (UCL). He was interested in tissue engineering and teaching ethics in reproduction. He was working on tissue engineering and stem cells mainly concerned with background research on stem cells and progenitor cells. Dr. Lee also had a keen interest in ethics and expressed this at UCL by running a course titled "Ethics of Fertility and Embryo Research". His students remarked him to be knowledgeable in the field of ethics and enthusiastic; they had particularly noted that he is clearly a fan of Kant.

He had previously served as an international editor of the Brazilian Journal of Assisted Reproduction. He served as a trustee and director of several charities. He was elected as a fellow of the Royal Society of Health (now Royal Society for Public Health) and the Royal Society of Medicine, both in 1987.

Lee's team at the Wellington pioneered the first UK practise of gamete Intra-fallopian transfer (GIFT), The GIFT of Life (a technique invented by Ricardo Asch in the United States). The team was the second to carry out GIFT and then proceeded to post the largest series in the world in 1986.

Lee also helped perform some of the first egg donations in the United Kingdom, when directing the Wellington Hospital IVF Laboratory.

Lee pioneered a simple inexpensive form of Mechanical Assisted Hatching in the UK. He produced the world's first intra-cytoplasmic sperm injection (ICSI with NASBA virus assay) virus free baby to an HIV discordant couple.

Lee had a number of media appearances having been on several TV shows as well as writing a number of newspaper articles . He wrote several books of his own: such as Counselling in Male Infertility, and was also a contributor/consultant in such books: The Miraculous World of The Unborn Baby (Quadrillion, Godalming, Surrey 1998) ISBN 1-85833-966-9, Natural Fertility (Hamlyn 2002) ISBN 0-600-60396-2 and Inconceivable Conceptions.

Lee was no stranger to controversy. In addition to his work in IVF, he had differences of opinion with the HFEA, including over the issue of human cloning. He states that if it may be done safely and effectively, and be morally justifiable.

Lee also wrote an article in the Sunday Times (10 November 2002) in the aftermath of a number of high-profile embryo transfer mixups in several human IVF clinics.

Professor Sammy Lee arranged a conference co-sponsored by the Progress Educational Trust entitled '21st Century Motherhood' at UCL in September 2009. Speakers included Peter Brinsden, Consultant Medical Director at Bourn Hall Clinic, Professor Lord Robert Winston and Professor Shere Hite.

Lee died suddenly on 21 July 2012.

== Education and experience ==
Lee was educated at Mill Hill School and received a B.Sc. in Physiology in 1979 from Chelsea College, (later merged into King's College London). He received a Ph.D. in Biophysics from University College London under the supervision of Prof. Ricardo Miledi, in a group associated with Sir Bernard Katz. He later received a Diploma in Counselling from London Hospital Medical College in 1991, and in 2004 a PGCE at the University of Greenwich.

Lee held the following appointments:

- Research Associate in Biophysics (1982–1984), and Anatomy & Embryology (1984–1985) University College London
- Laboratory Director, IVF unit at the Humana Hospital Wellington in London (1985–1986)
- Consultant Clinical Embryologist, UK division of Ares Serono (human recombinant pharmaceutical company)
- Scientific Director of the Colchester Fertility Service (1992 to 2001)
- Consultant Scientist and Director of intracytoplasmic sperm injection (ICSI) at the Portland Hospital for Women & Children (1995–2003)
- Acting Scientific Director for the Chelsea & Westminster Hospital (1999–2000).
- Honorary Senior Research Fellow in Reproductive Medicine at the Homerton Hospital (2000–2005)
- Honorary Lecturer in the Anatomy & Developmental Biology Dept., University College London (2003–present).
- Visiting Professor in Biomedical Science at the ABC Medical School in São Paulo, Brazil (2006–present).

== Bibliography ==
=== Selected journal articles ===
- M Buehr; S Lee; A McLaren; A Warner (1987). "Reduced gap junctional communication is associated with the lethal condition characteristic of DDK mouse eggs fertilized by foreign sperm" (PDF). Development. 101 (3): 449–459. doi:10.1242/dev.101.3.449. PMID 3502992.
- MI Glavinovic; S Lee; R Miledi (1987). "Effect of collagenase treatment on rat muscle fibre acetylcholinesterase activity". J. Neurosci. Res. 18 (4): 519–524. doi:10.1002/jnr.490180403. PMID 2830412. S2CID 19904911.
- S Lee; NB Gilula; A Warner (1987). "Gap junctional communication and compaction during preimplantation stages of mouse development". Cell. 51 (5): 851–860. doi:10.1016/0092-8674(87)90108-5. PMID 3677175. S2CID 42791291.
- S Lee; R Miledi; F Ruzzier (1987). "Rat diaphragm muscle fibre action potentials and the development of tetrodotoxin resistance in long-term organ culture". Quarterly Journal of Experimental Physiology. 72 (4): 601–608. doi:10.1113/expphysiol.1987.sp003100. PMID 2827223.
- DA Clark; S Lee; S Fishel; M Mahadevan; H Goodall; M Ah- Moye; O Schechter; J Stedronska-Clark; S Daya; J Underwood; I Craft; J Mowbray (1989). "Immunosuppressive activity in human IVF culture supernatants and prediction of outcome of embryo transfer". Journal of in Vitro Fertililisation Embryo Transfer. 6 (1): 51–58. doi:10.1007/BF01134582. PMID 2651541. S2CID 9400038.
- S. Lee; H Rivas-Toro (2001). "Treatment with IUI and ICSI for HIV men whose partners remain HIV- free: a risk reduction method". J. Bras. Reprod. Ass. 5: 64–65.
- S Lee (1987). "GIFT, the hope for future infertility treatment". Journal Royal Society of Health. 107 (5): 201–202. doi:10.1177/146642408710700517. PMID 3119850. S2CID 41121216.
- WAR Davies; HS Dhariwal; S Lee (1988). "GIFT and IUI in the district general hospital". Human Reproduction. 3 (5): 611–612. doi:10.1093/oxfordjournals.humrep.a136755. PMID 3170701.
- S Lee (1987). "Gamete intrafallopian transfer (GIFT); A great leap forward?". Human Reproduction. 2 (6): 541. doi:10.1093/oxfordjournals.humrep.a136584. PMID 3667909.
- M. Rissardo; S. Lee (2004). "Embryo implantation: is TNF-alpha the key?". Biomedical Scientist. 48: 1079–1085.
- S. Lee (2005). "Cloning today. Nine years on from Dolly". Biomedical Scientist. 49: 686–687.
- JD Alves; EL Radway-Bright; S Lee; B Grima; J Hothersall; CT Ravirajan; DA Isenberg (2005). "Antiphospholipid antibodies are induced by in vitro fertilization and correlate with paraoxonase activity and total antioxidant capacity of plasma in infertile women". Lupus. 14 (5): 1–8. doi:10.1191/0961203305lu2096oa. PMID 15934437. S2CID 20536101.

=== Newspaper articles ===
- S. Lee (26 January 2004). "Will the cloning doctors follow IVF road and go from villains to heroes?". The Scotsman.
- S. Lee. The baby factories. Sunday Telegraph. 10 November 2002.
- S. Lee (July 2002). "IVF mixups". BBC News. BBC.
- S. Lee (1999). "Cloning". BBC News. BBC.

=== Books and book chapters/contributions ===
- S Lee (1996). Counselling in male infertility. Oxford: Blackwell Scientific Press. ISBN 0-632-03906-X.
- S. Lee (2003). "Myths and reality in male infertility". In J. Haynes; amp; J. Miller (eds.). Inconceivable conceptions. Routledge. ISBN 1-58391-168-5.
