= Jean Purdy =

English embryologist and fertility nurse (1945–1985)

- Born: Jean Marian Purdy; 25 April 1945; Cambridge, England
- Died: 16 March 1985 (aged 39); Cambridge, England
- Resting place: Grantchester, Cambridgeshire
- Known for: In vitro fertilisation
- Scientific career
- Fields: Nursing; Embryology

Jean Marian Purdy (25 April 1945 – 16 March 1985) was a British nurse, embryologist and pioneer of fertility treatment. She was responsible with Robert Edwards and Patrick Steptoe for developing in vitro fertilisation (IVF); Louise Joy Brown, the first "test-tube baby", was born on 25 July 1978, and Purdy was the first to see the embryonic cells dividing. Purdy was a co-founder of the Bourn Hall Clinic but her role there and in the development of IVF was ignored for 30 years. Following the publication of Edwards' papers in the 2010s, her vital contributions to IVF have been publicly recognised.

== Early life and education ==
Jean Marian Purdy was born in Cambridge on 25 April 1945 to George Robert Purdy, a technician at the Cavendish Laboratory, and Gladys May Southgate, a homemaker. She had one older brother, John. She attended Cambridgeshire High School for Girls between 1956 and 1963 where she became a prefect, joined sports teams and played violin in the orchestra. She trained to be a nurse at Addenbrooke's Hospital in Cambridge.

== Career ==
After gaining registration as a nurse, Purdy moved to Southampton General Hospital. She became homesick and applied for a research post locally to work on tissue rejection. She later transferred to Papworth Hospital in Cambridgeshire where the first open-heart surgeries (and later, heart transplants) were pioneered in Britain. In 1968, she took the position of research assistant to the physiologist Robert Edwards at the Physiological Laboratory in Cambridge.

In 1968, Edwards began to collaborate with obstetrician and gynaecologist Patrick Steptoe, who had introduced laparoscopy (a minimally invasive surgical procedure performed in the abdomen) for gynaecology in the United Kingdom. This technique was crucial for harvesting oocytes without the need for major surgery. Purdy began her work with Steptoe and Edwards as a lab technician, with the aim of developing in vitro fertilisation (IVF; in which an egg is combined with sperm outside the living organism). Purdy systematically recorded the essential details of each case. She also apparently spent more time in at the laboratory in Oldham than Edwards did, recording the results of endocrine monitoring, organising laboratory equipment and supplies, and running various tests. Purdy was not involved in laparoscopic oocyte retrievals or the manipulation of embryos.

Purdy was the only person Edwards allowed in the lab, except for the American scientist Joseph Schulman. Purdy regularly worked away from home, sometimes managing the lab alone. In 1969 she travelled with Edwards to California, United States, to carry out research. She played a significant and increasingly vital role, to the extent that, when she took time off to care for her sick mother, work had to pause. Without Purdy’s systematic approach to research, the IVF project may have faltered.

During this time the team endured criticism and hostility from the national funding agency Medical Research Council (MRC), who saw the Cambridge institution’s clinical facilities as problematic. The MRC were antagonised by the applicants' high media profile and viewed IVF as experimental. In February 1971, funding from the MRC was sought but declined. In mid-1974, Edwards became depressed by a lack of progress and funding, as well as the long commute to Oldham. Edwards gave Purdy the choice of giving up the research to work on a unrelated project. According to Purdy's childhood friend Rosemary Carter, Purdy asserted her support for the IVF project and encouraged Edwards to continue their research.

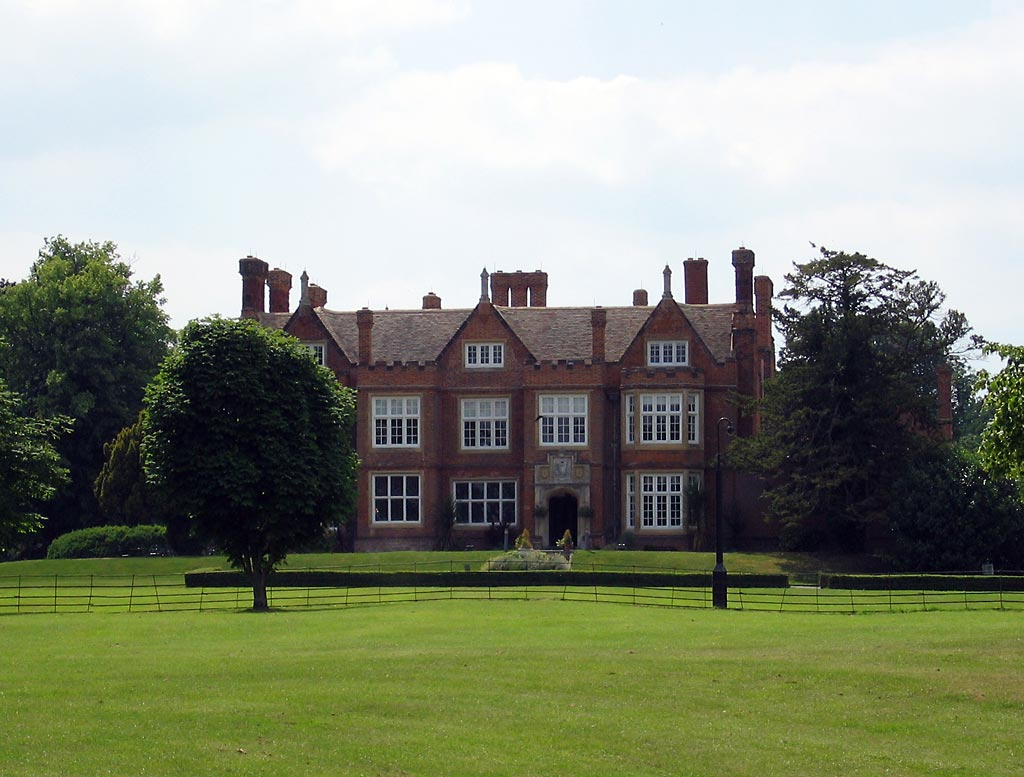
Bourn Hall Clinic in 2005

It was Purdy who first saw that a fertilised egg cell was dividing to make new cells. According to Purdy's obituary in The Times, Purdy was the first person to identify and describe the formation of human blastocysts. Louise Joy Brown, the first human born following conception by IVF, was born on 25 July 1978. Brown's birth vindicated the development team and put pressure on the MRC to quickly become a significant backer of the team's research. To train specialists, the team founded the Bourn Hall Clinic in 1980. The Bourn Hall property was suggested by Purdy and she played a major role in setting up Bourn Hall's IVF programme. She was formally titled the "technical director". Purdy was a co-author on 26 papers with Steptoe and Edwards, and 370 IVF children were conceived during her career.

== Personal life ==
Purdy has been remembered by friends and colleagues as unassuming with a gentle demeanour. She acted as a "go-between" for Edwards' and Steptoe's strong personalities. Purdy often interacted with both prospective husbands and wives on retrieval day. She also had an artistic side, evident from her collection of classical music records and her calligraphic abilities.

Purdy was also a deeply religious Christian (a member of the Christian Union) and rebutted religious criticisms of IVF. The Catholic Church raised objections to her work in her lifetime.

== Death ==
On 16 March 1985, Purdy died at the age of 39 in Addenbrooke's Hospital from melanoma. She had only been ill for a short time, and during her illness a room was arranged for her in Bourn Hall where she could work. She was buried in Grantchester, Cambridgeshire, beside her mother and grandmother. Her obituary in The Times, believed to be written by Edwards, included that Purdy was "the first person to recognize and describe the formation of the early human blastocyst... She contributed much to the establishment of the ethics of embryo care so essential to the development of treatments of infertile couples".

== Recognition ==
Despite being a central figure in the development of IVF, Purdy's contributions were largely forgotten by the public and scientific community. The factors that contributed to this include her early death, her role as a lab technician and her gender. Edwards was awarded the 2010 Nobel Prize in Physiology or Medicine for his work on the development of in vitro fertilisation; however, because the Nobel Prize is not awarded posthumously, neither Purdy nor Steptoe were eligible for consideration.

In 1980 a plaque was planned to honour the development of IVF. The plaque's text, as approved by administrators, excluded Purdy's name. Edwards protested against this omission but his objections were rejected by an administrator. The Oldham NHS Trust received a letter of complaint from Edwards in 1981. In his 1989 autobiography Edwards maintained Purdy's importance and described the core team as a "threesome".

In a plenary lecture in 1998, celebrating the 20th anniversary of clinical IVF, Edwards gave tribute to Jean Purdy, saying: "There were three original pioneers in IVF and not just two". Purdy's importance was recognised following the publication of Edwards' papers in the 2010s. In 2015, Professor Andrew Steptoe of the Royal Society of Biology (Patrick Steptoe's son) unveiled a blue plaque that acknowledged the three people involved in developing IVF. In 2018, to mark the 40th anniversary of IVF, Bourn Hall unveiled a memorial to Jean Purdy, the "world's first IVF nurse and embryologist. Co-founder of Bourn Hall Clinic".

University College London's award for the MRes (Master of Research) Reproductive Science and Women's Health is named after Purdy.

== Fictional portrayals ==
Purdy, Edwards, and Steptoe's work was dramatised in Gareth Farr's 2024 play A Child of Science, which premiered at the Bristol Old Vic. Purdy was portrayed by Meg Bellamy.

Also in 2024, Purdy was portrayed by Thomasin McKenzie in the biographical drama film Joy, which similarly follows the development of IVF.
