= Yona Tadir =

Israeli gynaecologist (born 1943)

- יונה תדיר
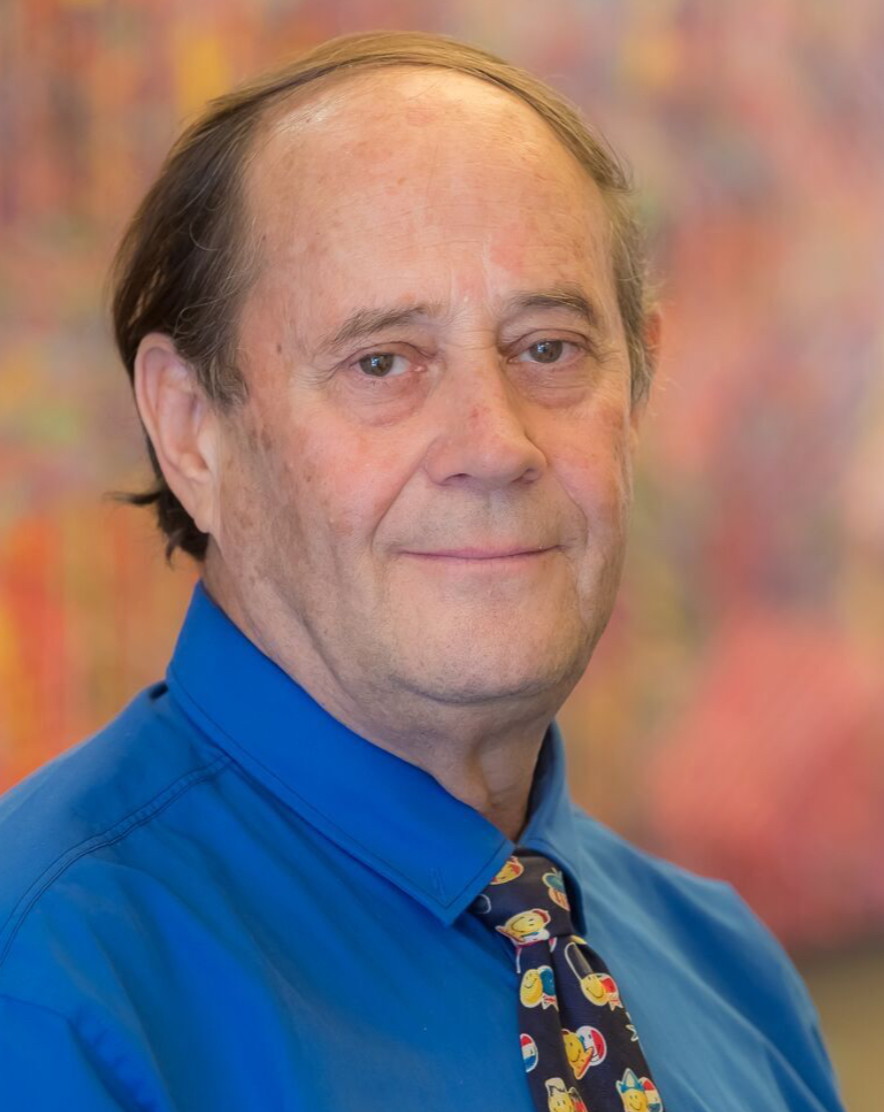
- Prof. Yona Tadir
- Born: 5 October 1943; Jerusalem
- Education: University of Vienna; Tel Aviv University
- Known for: Medical laser applications in gynecology; Endoscopic surgery; In vitro fertilization
- Spouse: Miriam Zelicky-Tadir
- Awards: Lifetime Achievement Award, American Society for Laser Medicine and Surgery (2021)
- Scientific career
- Fields: Gynecology, Obstetrics, Reproductive endocrinology, Medical laser
- Workplaces: University of California, Irvine; Tel Aviv University; Rabin Medical Center

Yona Tadir (יונה תדיר, born 5 October 1943) is a gynecologist and a professor at the University of California, Irvine, and Tel Aviv University.

== Early life & education ==
Tadir was born on 5 October 1943 in Jerusalem. He is the son of David Wultz-Tadir, who immigrated to Mandatory Palestine as a decathlete with the Maccabi Warsaw sports delegation, which came to the second Maccabiah Games in 1935. He remained in the country and thus survived the Holocaust. Wultz-Tadir was one of the founders of the sports infrastructure within the Hapoel organization and of the Israeli Olympic Committee.

In 1967, Tadir began studying medicine at the University of Vienna, continued at Tel Aviv University, and graduated with honors in 1974. From that year until 1980, he specialized in obstetrics and gynaecology at the Women's Health Center at Beilinson Hospital (now Rabin Medical Center).

In 1976, he specialized in reproductive endocrinology at Sheba Medical Center under Professor Bruno Lunenfeld. Two years later, he trained in gynecological microsurgery at Hammersmith Hospital in London.

In subsequent years, he undertook further fellowships in endoscopic surgery and in in-vitro fertilization (IVF) at the Bourne Hall Clinic in England with Mr. Steptoe and Prof. Edwards, the pioneers of the field who introduced IVF to the world. These specializations laid the groundwork for the establishment of the Endoscopic Surgery Unit in 1983 and the IVF Unit at Beilinson Hospital, which he managed from 1985 to 1991.

== Career ==
Tadir served as a combat medic in the Armored Corps and later as a commander of the combat medic training course. During his reserve duty, he served as a physician in the Israeli Air Force's elite Unit 669, with the rank of Major (res.) From 1991 to 1998, he served as Medical Director of the Beckman Laser Institute at the University of California, Irvine. After completing this role, he managed the "Ramat Marpeh" hospital network under Assuta Medical Centers until 2003.

In 2007, he founded and directed the Uterine Fibroid Center in the Women's Department at Beilinson Hospital, serving in this role until 2011. After completing his term as director of the Beckman Laser Institute and throughout his subsequent managerial and clinical work in Israel (1998–2024), Tadir continued to serve on the academic faculty at the University of California, contributing to both research and teaching.

Tadir also served as associate editor of the Lasers in Surgery and Medicine journal in the United States, and in 2021 was awarded a Lifetime Achievement Award by the American Society for Laser Medicine and Surgery (ASLMS) for his long-standing contributions to the development of medical laser technologies.

Over the course of his career, he has authored 200 scientific original and review articles four books on gynecology and medical laser applications and historic reference, "Gynecology in Israel, 1850–2023".

From 2005 to 2025, he served as the editor of the official website of the Israeli Society of Obstetrics and Gynecology.

== Notable research and inventions ==
Tadir developed medical devices for minimally invasive surgery and fertility treatments based on various technologies, including lasers.

- Endoscopic accessories for a surgical laser.
- Laser-integrated laparoscope
- Laser based micromanipulation system for IVF procedures
- Electric morcellator for laparoscopic removal of uterine fibroids, in collaboration with Professor Rolf Steiner from the University of Zurich
- Vaginal speculum for photodynamic therapy and method of using the same.
- Speculum for photodynamic therapy (PDT) of the cervix
- Intrauterine light-diffusing device for uterine cavity treatments.
- Endometrial ablation using photodynamic therapy with green porphyrins.
- Distributed optical pressure and temperature sensors.
- Device and method for treating chronic wounds.
- Non-invasive cervical dilation monitoring, in collaboration with Dr. Tom Milner
- Image-based health index scoring system for genitourinary tract, in collaboration with Dr. Zhongping Chen.
- Optical biopsy applicators for treatment planning, monitoring, and image-guided therapy, in collaboration with Dr. Zhongping Chen.

== Personal life ==
Tadir is married to Miri Tadir, PhD, Psychologist. The couple has three daughters and seven grandchildren.
