= Peter Brinsden =

British fertility doctor

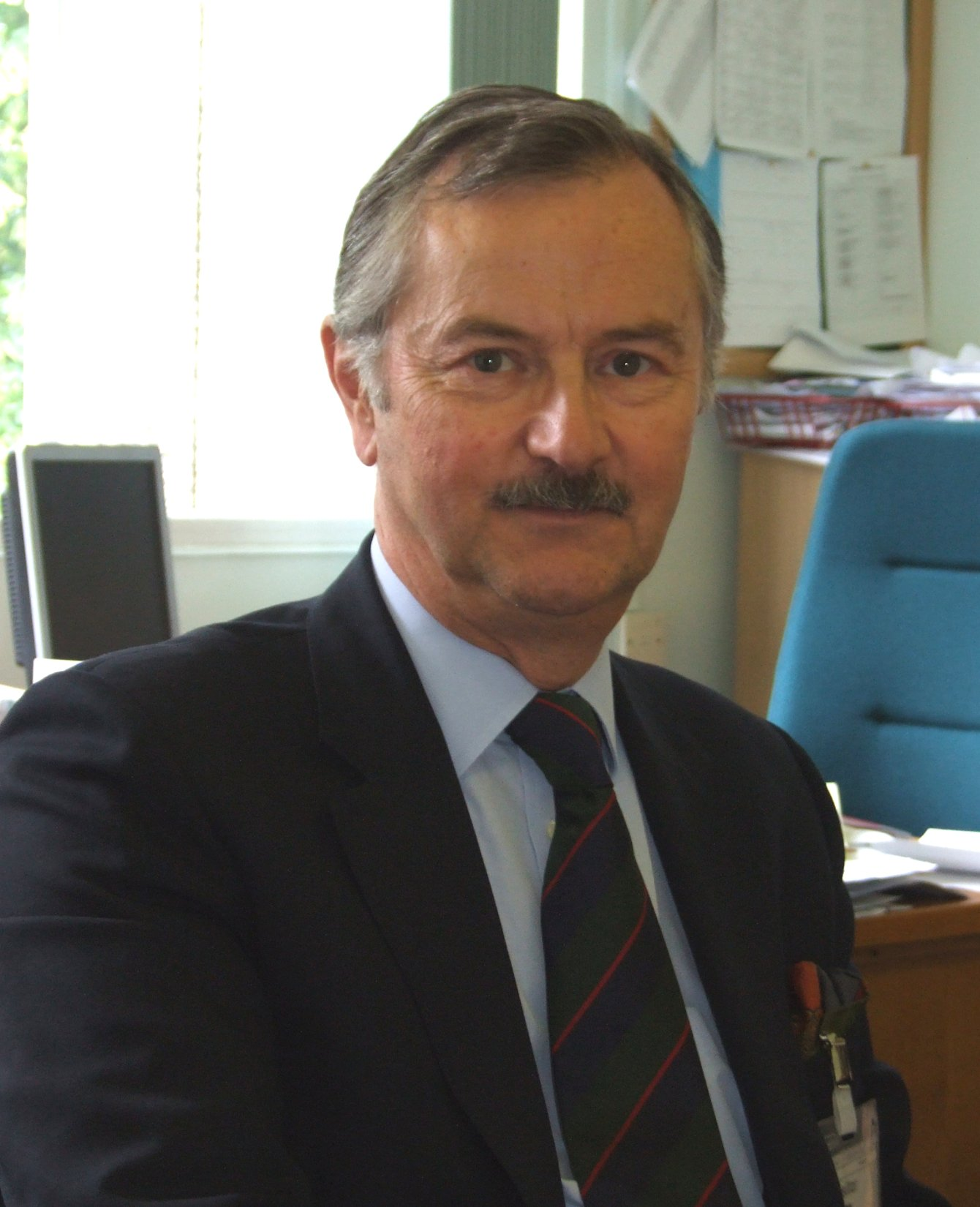
Peter Brinsden in 2007

Peter Robert Brinsden MBBS, MRCS, LRCP, FRCOG (born 2 September 1940) is a British fertility doctor. He is known for the treatment of infertility in couples. From 1989 to 2006 he was the medical director of Bourn Hall Clinic in the UK, a leading centre for the treatment of fertility problems, and where about 6,000 babies have been conceived using IVF and other assisted conception treatments.

== Biography ==
Brinsden was born in Peking in China in 1940. He lived in China, the United States, Canada and Hong Kong until 1950. Brinsden was educated at Rugby School, King's College London and St George's Hospital Medical School. He qualified MBBS and MRCS, LRCP in 1966.

Brinsden joined the Royal Navy in 1966, and served as ship's medical officer 1969–1970. He started training as a gynaecologist in 1970 in military and civilian NHS hospitals until 1978. He qualified DObst RCOG in 1981, MRCOG in 1976 and was elected FRCOG in 1989. Brinsden was made a Consultant Gynaecologist in 1978, with a principal interest in infertility treatment.

He retired from the Royal Navy in 1982 with the rank of surgeon commander. Brinsden served as a consultant at King Fahad Hospital, Riyadh in Saudi Arabia 1982–1985 and then at Bourn Hall Clinic under Patrick Steptoe, the IVF pioneer who, with Robert Edwards, was responsible for the birth of the world's first IVF baby Louise Brown in 1978.

Brinsden joined the Wellington Hospital IVF Unit, then the world's largest IVF and GIFT clinic, as deputy director. He was appointed medical director at Bourn Hall Clinic, Cambridge, in the UK in March 1989 following the death of Patrick Steptoe in 1988. Since his retirement in 2006 he has been the consultant medical director.

He has been an affiliated lecturer at the University of Cambridge's Clinical School at Addenbrookes Hospital since 1992, and a visiting professor in gynaecology and fertility at the Capital Medical University in Beijing since 2001. Brinsden has also been an inspector for the Human Fertilisation and Embryology Authority since 1997.

Brinsden is in great demand internationally as a lecturer on fertility and assisted conception issues, and in recent years has lectured at, among others, the Fertility Society of Australia's 2006 Conference, the Serono Symposia International, the Chicago 2007 Midwest Reproductive Symposium, and the 2006 Barbados IVF Conference.

Brinsden was elected president of the British Fertility Society in April 2009 and is the vice-chairman of The Nelson Society.

== Selected works ==
- Author or co-author of 93 publications on infertility and assisted conception.
- Author of 43 book chapters and co-editor of The Infertility Manual, and A Handbook of Intrauterine Insemination. Publisher: Cambridge University Press
- Editor of three editions of A Textbook of in Vitro Fertilisation and Assisted Reproduction.

Peter Brinsden has also written the following works

- An Atlas of in Vitro Fertilization. Publisher: Informa Healthcare
- A Textbook of in Vitro Fertilization and Assisted Reproduction. Publisher: Informa Healthcare
- "Treatment by in vitro fertilisation with surrogacy: experience of one British centre – Statistical Data Included," British Medical Journal (2000)
- "The presence of blood in the transfer catheter negatively influences outcome at embryo transfer," Human Reproduction, Volume 20, Number 7, July 2005, Oxford University Press
- "Oocyte number per live birth in IVF: were Steptoe and Edwards less wasteful?" Human Reproduction, Oxford University Press
