= John Webster (doctor) =

English doctor

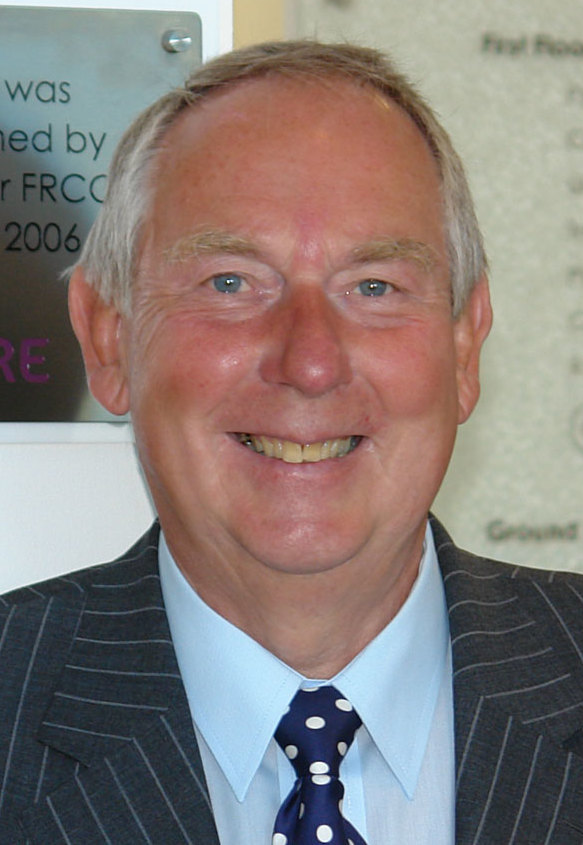
- Webster in 2006
- Born: 4 July 1936 (age 90)
- Education: University of Liverpool
- Known for: Assisting Patrick Steptoe with the birth of the world's first IVF baby, Louise Brown
- Scientific career
- Fields: Doctor
- Workplaces: Bourn Hall Clinic, Oldham General Hospital, CARE Fertility

John Webster FRCOG (born 4 July 1936) is an English obstetrician and gynaecologist. Present at the world's first in vitro fertilisation (IVF) birth, Louise Brown, Webster has continued to develop and further research in the field of IVF.

== Life and career ==
Webster graduated from University of Liverpool in 1960, gaining an MB ChB. From 1960 to 1963, he was a House Officer at Clatterbridge Hospital in Liverpool. From 1963 to 1964, he was the Senior House Officer to Mr Patrick Steptoe. From 1964 to 1974, Webster practised in Canada. From 1974 to 1980, he was a specialist in obstetrics and gynaecology and infertility as registrar / consultant to Mr Patrick Steptoe at Oldham General Hospital. It was during this time that Webster was involved with early pioneering research into in vitro fertilization with Patrick Steptoe and Bob Edwards. He was also awarded his MRCOG during this period.

Webster was present at the birth of Louise Brown (world's first IVF baby, born 25 July 1978) and assisted Patrick Steptoe with the delivery.

In 1980, Webster was invited by Steptoe and Edwards to establish with them the world's first IVF clinic at Bourn Hall. Webster served as Deputy Medical Director at Bourn Hall from 1980 to 1985.

In 1985 Webster established an IVF Unit (CARE Fertility) at the Park Hospital in Nottingham, the sixth unit in the UK, and the first in the Midlands. He served there as a medical director from 1985 to July 2006. He was also present at the opening of the new purpose built building which houses CARE Fertility in Nottingham, and is named after him, John Webster House.

In 1988 Webster was elected a Fellow of the Royal College of Obstetricians and Gynaecologists.

== Publications ==
1. IN VITRO FERTILISATION - Past Present Future Edited by S. Fishel and E. M. Symonds (IRL Press 1986)
