= Joy (2024 film) =

British biographical drama film

- Promotional poster
- Directed by: Ben Taylor
- Screenplay by: Jack Thorne
- Story by: Rachel Mason; Emma Gordon; Shaun Topp
- Produced by: Finola Dwyer; Amanda Posey
- Starring: Bill Nighy; Thomasin McKenzie; James Norton
- Cinematography: Jamie Cairney
- Edited by: David Webb
- Music by: Steven Price
- Production companies: Wildgaze; Pathé
- Distributed by: Netflix
- Release dates: 15 October 2024 (BFI); 15 November 2024 (United Kingdom); 22 November 2024 (Netflix)
- Running time: 115 minutes
- Country: United Kingdom
- Language: English

Joy is a 2024 British biographical drama film starring Bill Nighy, Thomasin McKenzie and James Norton. Directed by Ben Taylor from a screenplay by Jack Thorne, it is the true story of the world's first in vitro fertilisation baby Louise Brown. It was produced by Wildgaze and Pathé for Netflix. Based on real events in the 1960s and 1970s, nurse and embryologist Jean Purdy, visionary scientist Dr Robert Edwards and innovative surgeon Patrick Steptoe work to develop the first 'test tube baby'. The film was released on Netflix worldwide on 22 November 2024.

== Plot ==
In 1968, Nurse Jean Purdy gets hired at the University of Cambridge for a lab manager post, by scientist Dr Robert Edwards. Together, they recruit innovative obstetrician and surgeon Patrick Steptoe to join them in reproduction research, in an effort to combat infertility in women. Robert hopes to create a procedure which develops into in vitro fertilisation. Patrick reminds them that the government, church and everyone will oppose them.

Jean and her mother are shown to be regular churchgoers. They have a close relationship with their vicar Reverend Paulson, actively volunteering to help.

As the team have little funding, Jean and Robert must commute to Oldham four hours daily. He explains how they have been working with small rodents with some success. They fertilise their first human ovulo the next year. As they progress, The Daily Mirror is soon calling Robert "Dr. Frankenstein".

Word spreads, and soon Jean's mother confronts her, insisting that the research they are doing is playing God. Reverend Paulson soon asks her not to attend his services. Her mum then proceeds to tell her to not visit her if she continues her work.

Jean spends a time moody, upset by being shut out by her community and her mum. Matron Muriel calls her out for her cool treatment of the women participating in their study. Being a Christian, Jean disapproves of Patrick performing abortions. The matron points out their goal is to give women a choice, a safe one.

Opponents to their research claim a greater risk of abnormalities, and also fear future creation of humans artificially as mad scientists. Each of the researchers feels strain on their personal relationships. When the participants point out her impersonal treatment of them, Jean begins to interact more personally.

After successfully fertilising an egg, they approach The Medical Research Council in early 1971 for funding. They do their best to convince them of the importance of their work, but their petition is ultimately rejected. On the train ride they all express frustration, but Jean insists they must plow on.

As Jean gets to know the participants personally and by name they open up. Eventually Patrick asks her about her personal investment in the research, and she reveals she suffers from severe endometriosis. He offers to examine her for a second opinion but she declines. Later, after dancing with lab assistant Arun he proposes after mentioning having kids, but Jean says she cannot.

In early 1973, after another decidedly negative television appearance, the researchers begin to implant embryos in a few of the women which end up eventually failing in varying ways. In September, once all pregnancies have failed, Robert and Jean test all of their material, discovering contaminated parafin. Both lose it, with Jean ultimately quitting to go home to care for her dying mother.

While she is away, Robert shuts down the research lab. A year later, new father Arun bumps into Jean, telling her this. She confronts Robert about it, but he points out she quit first. Shortly after, her mum succumbs to her illness. Patrick and Matron Muriel come to the funeral, and a rested Jean has an epiphany to resume their research.

By following Jean's idea to resume the study by following each woman's natural cycle, in the summer of 1978, they finally produce the first 'test tube baby', to which Robert gives the name "Joy". The epilogue reveals that Jean died of cancer at age 39, and that Robert was awarded the Nobel Prize in 2010 for his, Jean’s and Patrick's work. (Note: The Nobel Prize is never awarded posthumously, making Jean Purdy and Patrick Steptoe ineligible for the award when Robert Edwards received it.)

== Cast ==
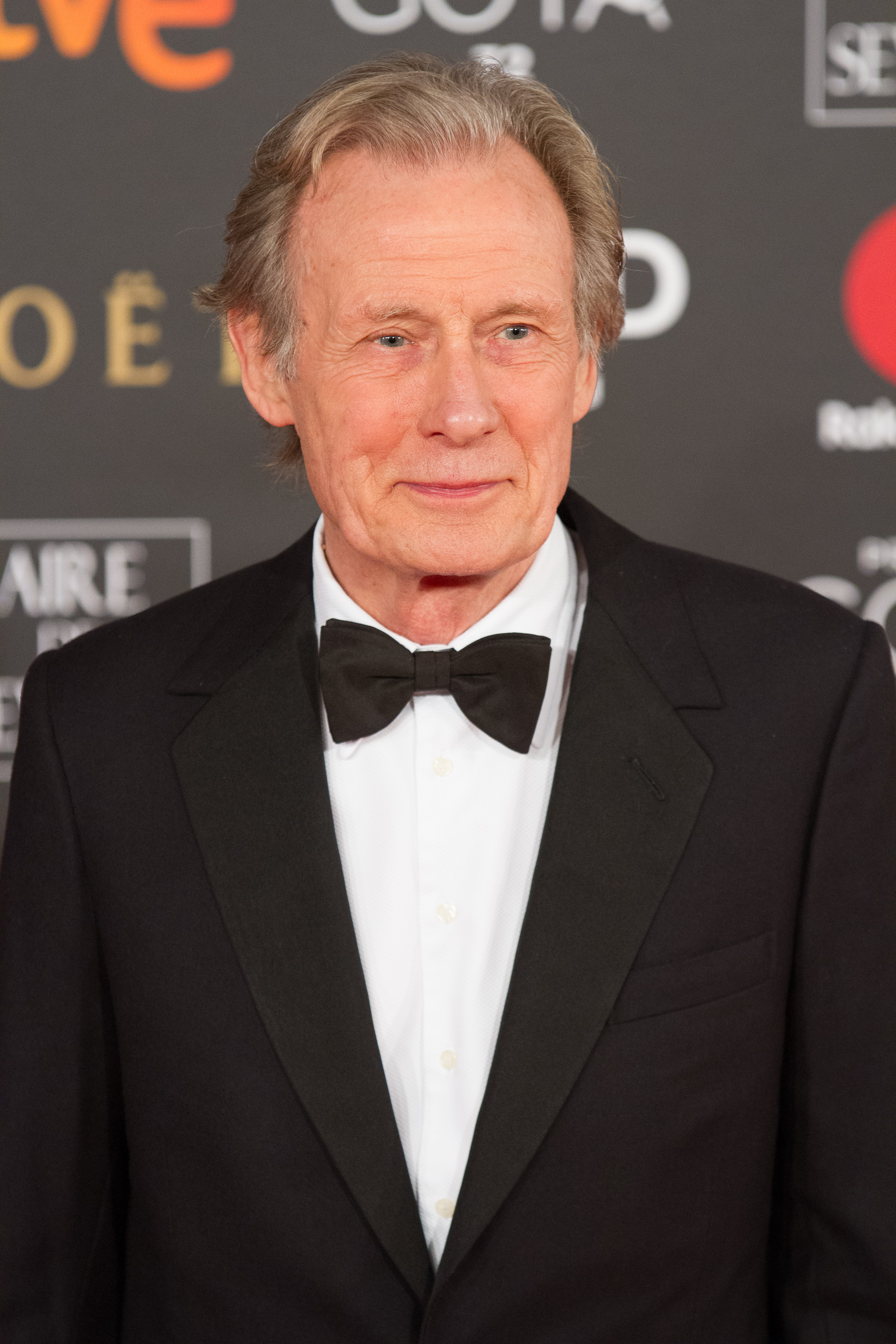
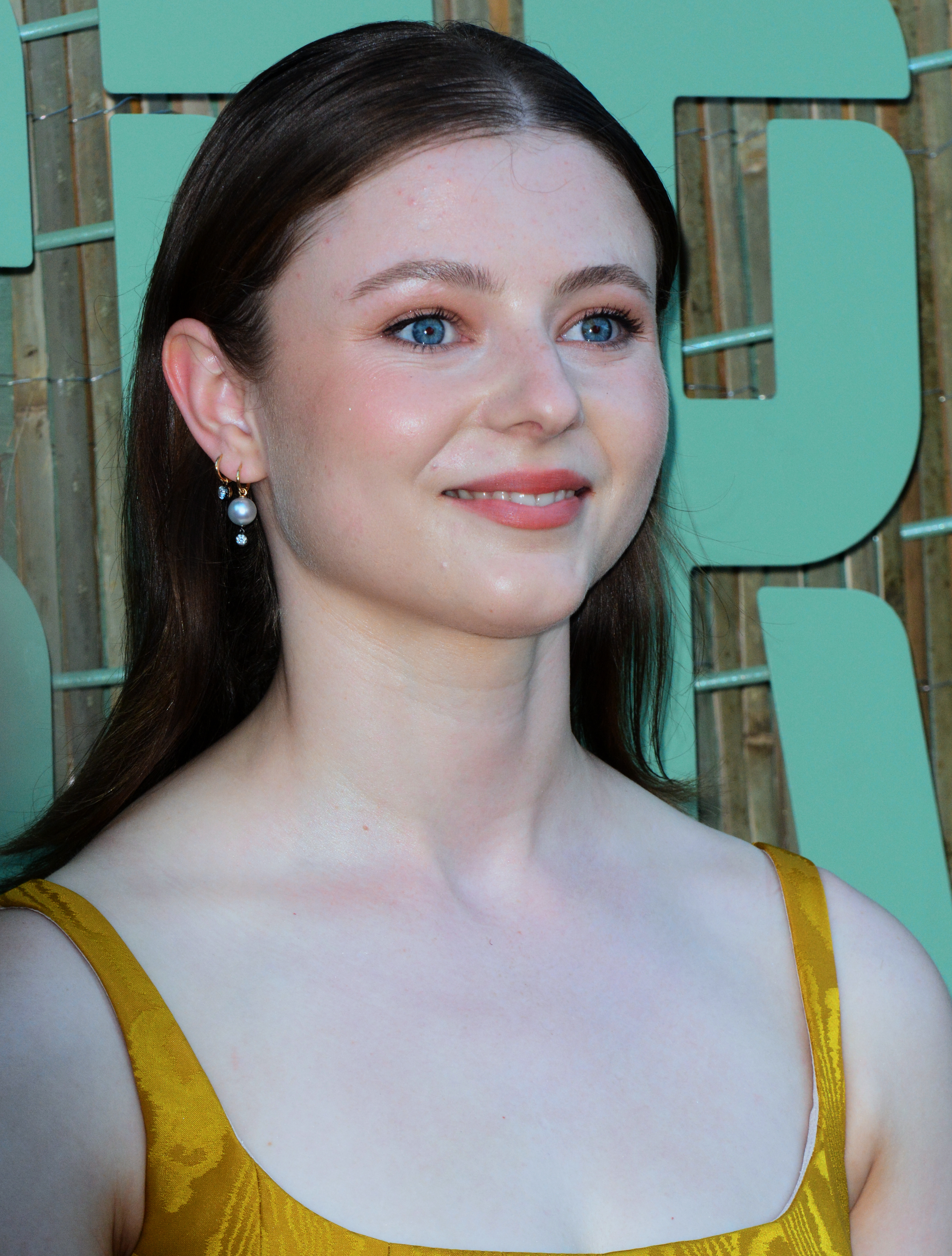
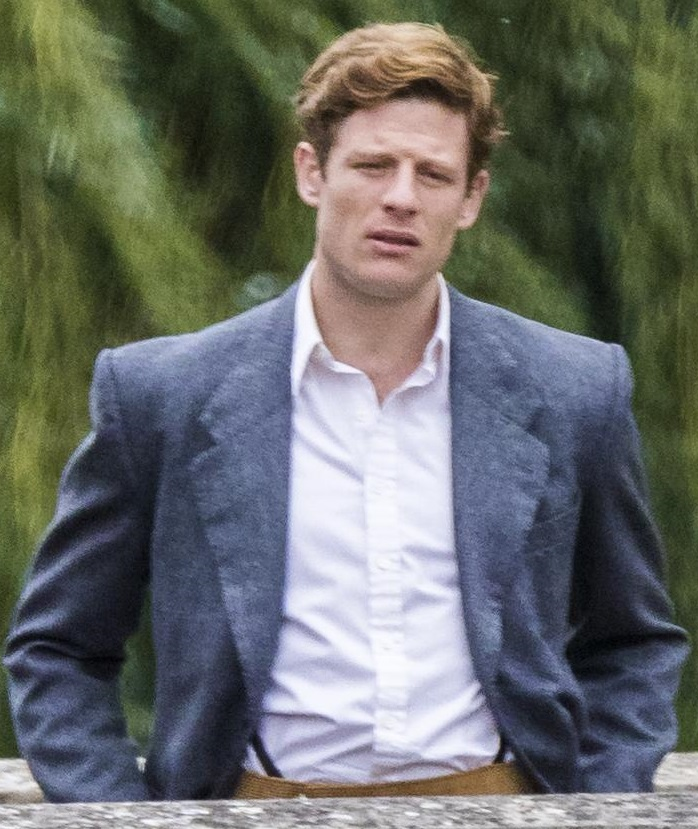
Left to right: Bill Nighy, Thomasin McKenzie and James Norton portrayed Patrick Steptoe, Jean Purdy and Robert Edwards respectively.
- Bill Nighy as Patrick Steptoe
- Thomasin McKenzie as Jean Purdy
- James Norton as Robert Edwards
- Joanna Scanlan as Gladys
- Charlie Murphy as Trisha
- Tanya Moodie as Muriel
- Ella Bruccoleri as Lesley Brown
- Douggie McMeekin as John Brown
- Rish Shah as Arun
- Ruth Madeley as Maggie
- Jemima Rooper as Ruth Edwards
- Miles Jupp as George
- Emily Fairn as Lily
- Nicholas Rowe as James Watson
- Louisa Harland as Rachel
- Pip Torrens as Roger Short
- Adrian Lukis as Professor Mason

== Production ==
A British production, the film is produced by Finola Dwyer and Amanda Posey for Wildgaze, with executive producer Cameron McCracken for Pathé. Husband and wife team Rachel Mason and Jack Thorne developed the story with Thorne providing the screenplay. Thorne explained the project was heavily inspired by his and Mason's experience of undergoing IVF to have their son. It is directed by Ben Taylor.

The cast is led by Bill Nighy, James Norton and Thomasin McKenzie and also includes Joanna Scanlan, Charlie Murphy, Tanya Moodie, Ella Bruccoleri and Rish Shah.

Filming got underway in the UK in September 2023.

== Release ==
The film premiered at the BFI London Film Festival on 15 October 2024, and had a limited theatrical release in the UK and Ireland on 15 November 2024. It was released on Netflix worldwide on 22 November 2024.

== Reception ==
On the review aggregator website Rotten Tomatoes, 89% of 55 critics' reviews are positive, with an average rating of 6.7/10. The website's consensus reads: "Handsomely made and given some verve by a deliciously dry Bill Nighy, Joy is an uplifting tribute to the miracles of science." Metacritic, which uses a weighted average, assigned the film a score of 62 out of 100, based on 17 critics, indicating "generally favorable" reviews.
