= Genetics and IVF Institute =

The Genetics & IVF Institute (GIVF) is an international provider of infertility and genetics services and products, and also engages in biomedical research in these fields. The Institute was founded in 1984 by Dr. Joseph D. Schulman and associates. GIVF headquarters are in Fairfax, VA, US, and its facilities include locations in Pennsylvania, Minnesota, California, and Texas in the United States, as well as in China, Mexico, and several other countries.

Genetics & IVF Institute has been responsible for numerous key innovations to help couples have healthy babies and to improve the reproductive health of women. These include:

First U.S. medical center to introduce non-surgical ultrasound guided egg retrieval (transvaginal oocyte retrieval) for IVF; achieved America's first frozen embryo twin birth; first American team to publicly report pregnancies using ICSI (intracytoplasmic sperm injection); first to offer clinical laboratory testing for certain mutations in the BRCA1 and BRCA2 genes which cause hereditary breast cancer; developed the important technique of non-surgical sperm aspiration for improved treatment of male infertility; first in the world to initiate ovarian cryopreservation for storage of oocytes for women with cancer; discovered a method (non-disclosing preimplantation genetic testing) for the effective prevention of Huntington disease; developed MicroSort, an important flow-cytometric human sperm separation technique for preconceptual gender selection.

The services and research activities at Genetics & IVF have been the subject of articles in newspapers, such as the New York Times.

In 1998, the Institute opened a branch facility in Shanghai, China.

The Institute's American activities involve a large donor egg program, a group of sperm banks and egg banks, preimplantation genetics testing centers, and oocyte cryopreservation via vitrification in addition to more conventional IVF, infertility, and genetic services.
