= Thomasin McKenzie =

New Zealand actress (born 2000)

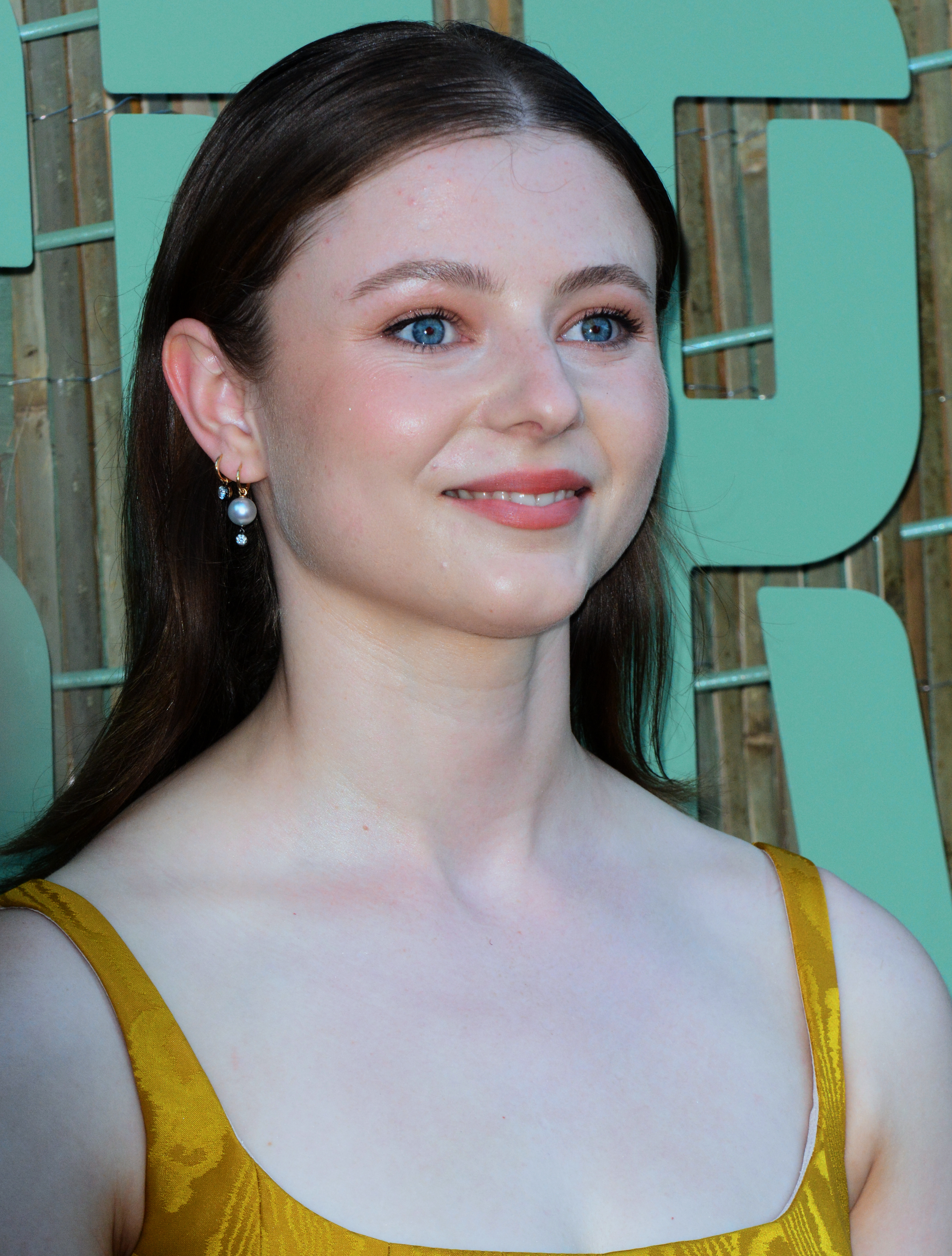
- McKenzie in 2024
- Born: Thomasin Harcourt McKenzie; 26 July 2000 (age 26); Wellington, New Zealand
- Occupation: Actress
- Years active: 2012–present
- Mother: Miranda Harcourt
- Relatives: Kate Harcourt (maternal grandmother); Davida McKenzie (sister); Geraldine Harcourt (cousin once removed)

Thomasin Harcourt McKenzie (born 26 July 2000) is a New Zealand actress. After a minor role in The Hobbit: The Battle of the Five Armies (2014), she rose to critical prominence for playing a young girl living in isolation in Debra Granik's drama film Leave No Trace (2018), winning the National Board of Review Award for Breakthrough Performance.

McKenzie continued gaining recognition in 2019 with supporting roles in the period films The King and True History of the Kelly Gang, as well as for her role as the Jewish girl Elsa Korr in the satirical film Jojo Rabbit. In 2021, she starred in M. Night Shyamalan's thriller Old and Edgar Wright's psychological horror film Last Night in Soho, and featured in Jane Campion's western film The Power of the Dog. She has since played the title role in the thriller Eileen (2023), embryologist Jean Purdy in the biographical drama Joy (2024), Mary Partington in the historical musical drama The Testament of Ann Lee (2025), and Rose Davenport in the period satirical comedy Fackham Hall (2025).

== Early life ==
McKenzie was born 26 July 2000 in Wellington, New Zealand, and attended Samuel Marsden Collegiate School in Wellington's Karori suburb, graduating in 2018. Her parents are actress and acting coach Dame Miranda Harcourt, and director Stuart McKenzie. She stated that when she was young, she didn't want to be an actor and wanted to work with animals and become a vet or zookeeper instead. She is the granddaughter of actress Dame Kate Harcourt and Peter Harcourt, whose family founded the real estate company Harcourts International in Wellington.

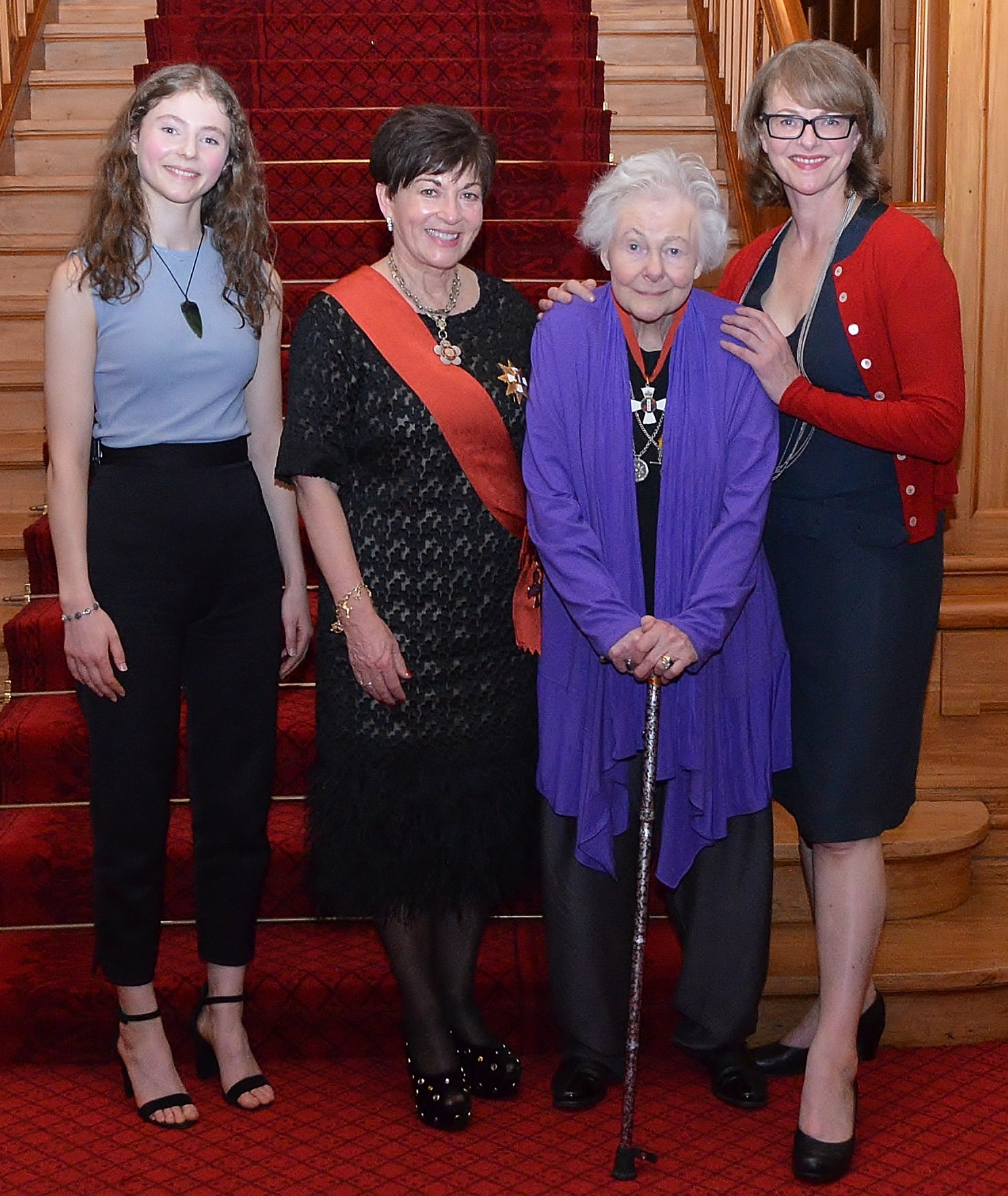
From left: McKenzie, Dame Patsy Reddy, grandmother Kate Harcourt and mother Miranda Harcourt in September 2018

Her elder brother Peter is a Reuters journalist, and her younger sister Davida is an actress.

== Career ==
=== 2012–2016: Initial roles ===
After appearing with her brother in the film Existence (2012), McKenzie portrayed teenager Louise Nicholas, a New Zealand woman who was assaulted by police officers in the television film Consent: The Louise Nicholas Story (2014). McKenzie attributed her attraction to the part "to help her voice to be heard. That really shifted my understanding of what acting was - that through acting you are given the chance to create change" motivations. In 2015, she played Pixie Hannah in the soap opera Shortland Street. The following year, she played the titular character in the children's comedy web series Lucy Lewis Can't Lose.

=== 2018–present: Leave No Trace and breakthrough ===
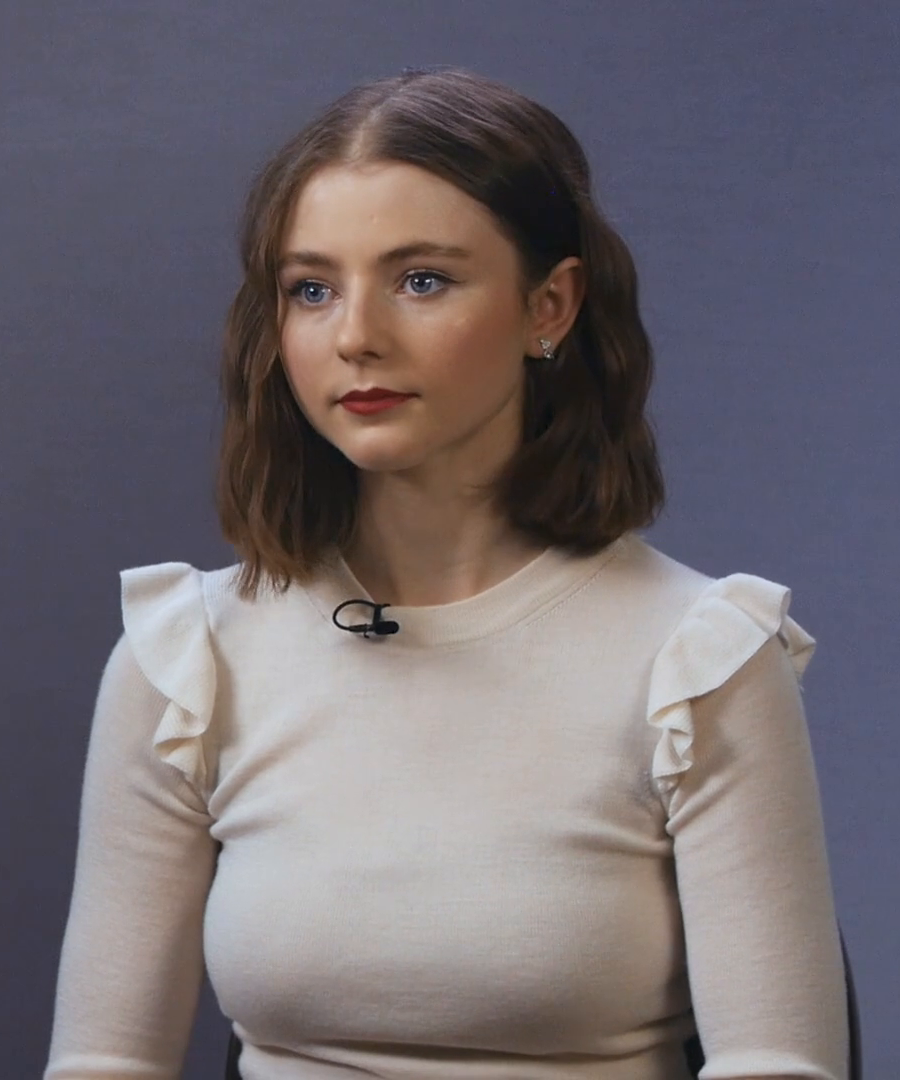
McKenzie during an interview for Jojo Rabbit in 2019

She gained recognition for her portrayal as a daughter of a war veteran in Debra Granik's Leave No Trace (2018) opposite Ben Foster. It is the most reviewed film to hold an approval rating of 100% on Rotten Tomatoes. Her performance received critical acclaim and won her the National Board of Review Award for Breakthrough Performance, and nominations from the Critics' Choice Movie Awards, Gotham Awards, and Independent Spirit Awards, among other accolades. Manohla Dargis of The New York Times said her performance was "sensitive, tightly checked performances are critical in this regard." In 2019, McKenzie joined the ensemble cast of Netflix's The King as Queen Philippa of Denmark, starring alongside Timothée Chalamet, Joel Edgerton and Robert Pattinson. She next played the role of a young Jewish girl who hides in the home of the title character in Taika Waititi's satirical comedy-drama Jojo Rabbit (2019) for which she obtained a nomination at the Critics' Choice Movie Award as Best Young Actress.

In August 2018, McKenzie was cast in Top Gun: Maverick, but dropped out of the film after signing onto Lost Girls (2020). In 2021, she starred in the M. Night Shyamalan's thriller Old, and played the lead character in Edgar Wright's psychological horror film Last Night in Soho, opposite Anya Taylor-Joy. In the same year, she joined John Crowley's televised adaptation of Kate Atkinson's novel Life After Life for BBC Two, which premiered in 2022.

In 2023, McKenzie joined the main cast of the second season of Pantheon, a science fiction drama adaptation of the series of short stories by Ken Liu, voicing MIST, the first C.I. (computational intelligence) born of U.I. (uploaded intelligence). In the same year, she played the lead character in William Oldroyd's psychological thriller Eileen, opposite Anne Hathaway. For her performance, she received positive reviews, with David Fear of Rolling Stone describing her as "such an adept performer at sketching out people that are somehow both sheltered and jaded that you have a clear picture of her even before her dark twin shows up."

McKenzie portrayed British embryologist Jean Purdy in the 2024 film Joy, based on the true story of the world's first in vitro fertilisation baby.

In 2025, McKenzie starred as Rose Davenport in the British period comedy Fackham Hall, written by comedian Jimmy Carr. Later that year, she starred opposite Amanda Seyfried in the historical drama musical film The Testament of Ann Lee directed by Mona Fastvold.

McKenzie stars in the historical action film The Uprising, she starred opposite Andrew Garfield. Two weeks later, on September 25, 2026, the horror film Victorian Psycho is set to release, in which McKenzie stars opposite Maika Monroe.

McKenzie stars in two films that are in post-production: Rule of Three, a horror film directed by James Roday Rodriguez, and Dinner with Audrey, a biographical drama film in which McKenzie plays the titular role of Audrey Hepburn. She is also set to recur in the third season of the Amazon Prime Video series Fallout.

== Influences ==
In interviews with Harper's Bazaar and Mastermind Magazine, McKenzie cited Audrey Hepburn, Julie Andrews, Jennifer Lawrence, and Michelle Williams as influences. Her favourite films include My Neighbor Totoro, Winter's Bone, Notting Hill, Everything Everywhere All at Once, Interstellar, E.T., The Sixth Sense, The Fabelmans, Barry Lyndon, The Rocky Horror Picture Show and The Princess Diaries.

== Personal life ==
McKenzie has always loved playing the piano with her grandmother since childhood. In March 2017, McKenzie was living in Wellington, New Zealand. McKenzie moved to Islington, United Kingdom, in June 2023. By September 2026, she had returned to Wellington. She has previously discussed struggling with anxiety, panic attack and impostor syndrome.

=== Political views ===
In September 2025, McKenzie was among thousands of cinema workers who signed the Film Workers for Palestine pledge, to stand for an end to genocide and for a free Palestine.

== Filmography ==
Key
†	Denotes film or TV productions that have not yet been released

=== Film ===
Year	Title	Role	Notes	Ref.
2014	The Hobbit: The Battle of the Five Armies	Astrid		
2017	The Changeover	Rose Keaton		
2018	Leave No Trace	Tom		
2019	The King	Queen Philippa of Denmark		
2019	Jojo Rabbit	Elsa Korr		
2019	True History of the Kelly Gang	Mary Hearn		
2020	Lost Girls	Sherre Gilbert		
2021	The Justice of Bunny King	Tonyah		
2021	Old	Maddox Cappa (aged 16)		
2021	Last Night in Soho	Eloise "Ellie" Turner		
2021	The Power of the Dog	Lola		
2023	Eileen	Eileen Dunlop		
2024	Joy	Jean Purdy		
2025	The Testament of Ann Lee	Mary Partington / Narrator		
2025	Fackham Hall	Rose Davenport		
2026	Victorian Psycho	Miss Lamb		
2026	The Uprising	Alyce		
TBA	Rule of Three †	Lizzy	Post-production	
TBA	Dinner with Audrey †	Audrey Hepburn	Post-production	

=== Television ===
Year	Title	Role	Notes	Ref.
2015–2020	Shortland Street	Pixie Hannah	Recurring role	
2016	Lucy Lewis Can't Lose	Lucy Lewis	Lead role	
2022	Life After Life	Ursula Todd	Miniseries	
2023	Totally Completely Fine	Vivian Cunningham	Lead role	
2023	Pantheon	MIST (voice)	Main role; season 2	
TBA	Fallout †	TBA	Recurring role (season 3)	

== Awards and nominations ==
Award	Year	Category	Work	Result	Ref.
Alliance of Women Film Journalists	2019	Best Supporting Actress	Leave No Trace	Nominated	
Alliance of Women Film Journalists	2019	Best Breakthrough Performance	Leave No Trace	Won	
Chicago Film Critics Association	2018	Most Promising Performer	Leave No Trace	Nominated	
Chlotrudis Awards	2019	Best Actress	Leave No Trace	Nominated	
Chlotrudis Awards	2023	Best Supporting Actress	The Justice of Bunny King	Nominated	
Columbus Film Critics Association	2019	Best Actress	Leave No Trace	Nominated	
Critics' Choice Movie Awards	2019	Best Young Actor/Actress	Leave No Trace	Nominated	
Critics' Choice Movie Awards	2020	Best Young Actor/Actress	Jojo Rabbit	Nominated	
Denver Film Critics Society	2019	Best Supporting Actress	Leave No Trace	Nominated	
Detroit Film Critics Society	2018	Best Supporting Actress	Leave No Trace	Nominated	
Dublin Film Critics' Circle	2018	Best Actress	Leave No Trace	Nominated	
Florida Film Critics Circle	2018	Pauline Kael Breakout Award	Leave No Trace	Runner-up	
Georgia Film Critics Association	2019	Best Supporting Actress	Leave No Trace	Nominated	
Georgia Film Critics Association	2019	Breakthrough Award	Leave No Trace	Nominated	
Gotham Independent Film Awards	2018	Breakthrough Actor	Leave No Trace	Nominated	
Greater Western New York Film Critics Association	2018	Best Debut Performance	Leave No Trace	Nominated	
Hawaii Film Critics Society	2022	Best Actress	Last Night in Soho	Nominated	
Hollywood Film Critics Association	2020	Best Actress 23 and Under	Jojo Rabbit	Nominated	
Independent Spirit Awards	2019	Best Supporting Female	Leave No Trace	Nominated	
Indiana Film Journalists Association	2018	Best Actress	Leave No Trace	Nominated	
Indiana Film Journalists Association	2018	Breakout of the Year	Leave No Trace	Nominated	
Indiana Film Journalists Association	2019	Best Supporting Actress	Jojo Rabbit	Nominated	
IndieWire Critics Poll	2018	Best Supporting Actress	Leave No Trace	Nominated	
Kansas City Film Critics Circle	2018	Best Supporting Actress	Leave No Trace	Nominated	
Los Angeles Online Film Critics Society	2018	Best Actress 23 and Under	Leave No Trace	Nominated	
Music City Film Critics Association	2019	Best Young Actress	Leave No Trace	Nominated	
Music City Film Critics Association	2020	Best Young Actress	Jojo Rabbit	Nominated	
National Board of Review	2018	Best Breakthrough Performance	Leave No Trace	Won	
Online Association of Female Film Critics	2018	Best Supporting Female	Leave No Trace	Nominated	
Online Association of Female Film Critics	2018	Best Breakthrough Performance	Leave No Trace	Nominated	
Online Film and Television Association	2019	Best Youth Performance	Leave No Trace	Nominated	
Online Film and Television Association	2019	Best Female Breakthrough	Leave No Trace	Nominated	
Online Film Critics Society	2018	Best Supporting Actress	Leave No Trace	Nominated	
Philadelphia Film Critics Circle	2019	Best Breakthrough Performance	Jojo Rabbit	Runner-up	
Phoenix Critics Circle	2019	Best Supporting Actress	Jojo Rabbit	Won	
San Diego Film Critics Society	2018	Best Supporting Actress	Leave No Trace	Nominated	
San Diego Film Critics Society	2018	Best Breakthrough Artist	Leave No Trace	Won	
San Diego Film Critics Society	2019	Best Supporting Actress	Jojo Rabbit	Nominated	
San Francisco Film Critics Circle	2018	Best Supporting Actress	Leave No Trace	Nominated	
Seattle Film Critics Society	2018	Best Youth Performance	Leave No Trace	Nominated	
Seattle Film Critics Society	2019	Best Youth Performance	Jojo Rabbit	Won	
Seattle International Film Festival	2018	Best Actress	Leave No Trace	Nominated	
Washington D.C. Area Film Critics Association	2018	Best Youth Performance	Leave No Trace	Nominated	
Washington D.C. Area Film Critics Association	2019	Best Youth Performance	Jojo Rabbit	Nominated	
Women Film Critics Circle	2018	Best Young Actress	Leave No Trace	Nominated	
Women's Image Network Awards	2020	Best Actress in a Feature Film	Jojo Rabbit	Nominated	
