= The Justice of Bunny King =

- Directed by: Gaysorn Thavat
- Written by: Sophie Henderson
- Produced by: Emma Slade
- Starring: Essie Davis; Thomasin McKenzie
- Distributed by: Madman Entertainment; Protagonist Pictures
- Release date: 29 July 2021
- Running time: 101 minutes
- Country: New Zealand
- Language: English

The Justice of Bunny King is a New Zealand film directed by Gaysorn Thavat and starring Essie Davis and Thomasin McKenzie. The film was Thavat's feature directorial debut. It premiered on 29 July 2021.

== Plot summary ==
Bunny King is a single mother who has served time in prison for manslaughter after killing her abusive husband Bryan King. A homeless Bunny plies a living cleaning car windows in Auckland. Due to her criminal conviction and homelessness, Bunny is denied visitation rights to her two children Reuben and Shannon by Government Family Service (GFS) social workers.

Unable to find a home to rent, Bunny finds shelter with her sister Grace and her husband Bevan, who allow her to stay in return for cooking, babysitting their children, and washing their car. This arrangement falls apart after Bunny discovers Bevan molesting his step-daughter Tonyah. When Bunny reports the abuse to Grace, Bevan claims that he was giving Tonyah a driving lesson. Grace believes Bevan over Bunny and her daughter Tonyah, forcing Bunny to leave.

Bunny subsequently finds shelter with the family of a Samoan window cleaner named Semu. Semu's mother helps Bunny to secure visitation rights for Shannon's fifth birthday by going along with her pretence that she is her landlord. In addition, Bunny manages to gain access to a luxury inner-city apartment by posing as a wealthy prospective buyer. Bunny is trying to secure a place to live so her children Reuben and Shannon will be returned to her, and to protect Tonyah from her abusive step-father. After stealing Bevan's car, Bunny invites Tonyah to "live" with her in the inner-city apartment.

However, Bunny's plans fall apart after she makes an unauthorised visit to the children's foster parents. As a result, Bunny's children are resettled with a new foster family in Thames. Determined to attend Shannon's fifth birthday, Bunny travels with Tonyah to Thames. Tonyah's mother and step-father report that Bunny kidnapped their daughter and stole Bevan's car.

While attempting to locate her children's whereabouts at the local GFS office in Thames, Bunny is recognised as a fugitive by the social workers, who attempt to detain her. Bunny takes a social worker named Trish Reihana hostage. The police arrive and a detective called Goodman initiates negotiations with Bunny. Bunny demands that she have a birthday party with her children. in the GFS office. In an attempt to defuse the crisis, Grace and Bevan attempt to convince Bunny to release Tonyah. However, Tonyah takes the opportunity to expose Bevan's abuse and to call out her mother for not protecting her.

After learning about Bunny's abuse at the hands of her late husband, Trish understands that Bunny has been trying to protect her children and niece Tonyah. Realising the police will never allow the children in the GFS office Trish arranges for Bunny to speak with her children via phone. Following tea -which Trish makes out of compassion for Bunny - and eating birthday cake, Bunny agrees to surrender. While approaching the door, Bunny reaches for her pocket, leading members of the Armed Offenders Squad to believe she is reaching for a weapon and shoot her in the arm. Tonya escapes in her step-father's stolen car, having recovered the keys. Bunny survives the gunshot wound and is tended to by paramedics. As Bunny is driven away in an ambulance, one of the paramedics remarks to her "I can tell you're a fighter."

== Cast ==
- Essie Davis as Bunny King
- Thomasin McKenzie as Tonyah
- Amelie Baynes as Shannon
- Angus Stevens as Reuben
- Xana Tang as Ai Ling (case worker)
- Toni Potter as Grace
- Erroll Shand as Bevan
- Phil Peleton as letting agent
- Bronwyn Bradley as Lisa (Auckland case worker)
- Tanea Heke as Trish (Thames case worker)
- Ryan O'Kane as Detective Jerry Goodman

== Production ==
Principal photography occurred in New Zealand in September 2019.

== Release ==
The Justice of Bunny King premiered on 29 July 2021. The film was distributed in New Zealand by Madmen Entertainment. It was also screened at the Tribeca Film Festival, Revelation Perth International Film Festival, Sydney Film Festival, and the Melbourne International Film Festival.

== Critical reception ==
Stuff's reviewer Graeme Tuckett awarded The Justice of Bunny King four and a half stars, describing it as "an angry, funny and deeply loveable gem of a movie." He praised Essie Davis' performance as the protagonist Bunny King and the work of director Gaysorn Thavat. Tuckett also credited the film for shedding light on the impersonality of New Zealand social services and the growing inequality between home owners and renters.

Newshub's reviewer Kate Rodger awarded the film five stars; praising Thavat's direction of the film, script writer Sophie Henderson's scriptwriting, and the cinematography of Ginny Loane and Cushla Dillon. She also praised the film for focusing on the "little-seen lives of women and families living with trauma, desperation and powerlessness and she's amazing."

The Spinoff's reviewer Rachel Kerr described The Justice of Bunny King as following in the tradition of British film-maker Ken Loach's I, Daniel Blake and popular New Zealand films such as Goodbye Pork Pie. Kerr also praised Davis' performance as Bunny, focusing on her ability to convey a range of emotions. She also described Thomasin McKenzie's performance as Bunny's abused niece Tonyah as "restrained and authentic, a subdued presence off-setting Bunny." Kerr also praised Loane's cinematography for conveying emotions and scriptwriter Henderson for combining elements of both social realism and the caper film genre.
