= Joseph D. Schulman =

American geneticist

Joseph Daniel Schulman (born 1941) is an American physician, medical researcher, and biomedical entrepreneur in the fields of genetic diseases and human reproduction.

== Life ==
Schulman was born in 1941 in Brooklyn, New York. He graduated from Harvard Medical School in 1966 and trained in pediatrics, genetics, and obstetrics and gynecology at Massachusetts General Hospital, the National Institutes of Health, and Cornell-New York Hospital Medical Center. Schulman worked at Cambridge University with Drs. Robert Geoffrey Edwards and Patrick Steptoe, contributing to the development of the first methods for successful human in-vitro fertilization (IVF). He is recognized as a pioneer and authority in the fields of fetal medicine, prenatal genetics, and IVF.

== Career ==
In 1974, Schulman joined the staff of the National Institute of Child Health and Human Development where he headed the Section on Human Biochemical Genetics. He founded and was first Director of the Interinstitute Program in Medical Genetics, remaining at the National Institutes of Health until 1983. During this period, the major research contributions of Schulman and his associates were in the field of the inborn errors of metabolism, especially diseases of sulfur metabolism. They demonstrated that cystinosis is a lysosomal storage disease caused by hereditary absence of the transmembrane lysosomal carrier for cystine, and proved that the enzyme gamma-glutamyl transpeptidase was not, contrary to current theory, required for normal transcellular amino acid transport. Schulman and David Cogan of the National Eye Institute were also the first to utilize cysteamine eyedrops for treatment of the painful photophobia and ocular crystals characteristic of cystinosis, and this treatment is widely utilized today. The prevention of abnormal genital masculinization in female fetuses with congenital adrenal hyperplasia by prenatal administration of dexamethasone to the mother, first proposed and utilized by Schulman and his colleagues at NIH, has also become a widely accepted therapy.

In 1984, Schulman founded the Genetics & IVF Institute, which has pioneered the development and early introduction of numerous innovative diagnoses and treatments in human genetics and infertility, and is now an international company in these fields. The institute was the first in the United States to introduce transvaginal non-surgical IVF (replacing laparoscopy and now the standard method worldwide), and also to report pregnancies using ICSI (intracytoplasmic sperm injection) for the treatment of severe male infertility. The institute also was one of the first centers in the world to introduce chorionic villus sampling (CVS) as an earlier alternative to amniocentesis for prenatal diagnosis, the first to offer clinical testing for certain common mutations in the BRCA1 and BRCA2 genes, considered to be responsible for a significant fraction of hereditary breast cancers, and the first to offer prenatal testing for cystic fibrosis. Schulman and associates also developed the world's first system for the use of non-disclosing preimplantation genetic testing for the prevention of Huntington disease. More recently, Schulman and his colleagues have established that flow-cytometric sorting (MicroSort) of living human sperm can modify the proportion of viable X-bearing and Y-bearing sperm and that such technology can increase the proportion of girls or boys born after insemination with sorted sperm. This innovation was notable for improving the ability to choose the sex of a child conceived by the above-cited methods. Decades after its introduction, fetal genetic testing is increasingly used, despite some initial hesitancy to adopt it. The institute, under Schulman's direction, was responsible for starting the first modern genetics/infertility treatment center in Shanghai, China, one of the largest IVF programs in the world.

Schulman was CEO of the Genetics & IVF Institute until 1998, and was chairman of its board of directors to 2024. He previously served as an affiliate professor at the medical schools of Virginia Commonwealth University and the University of California, San Diego.

Schulman is the author of Robert G. Edwards: A Personal Viewpoint, a personal account of Nobel Laureate, Robert G. Edwards, and events relevant to the development of modern methods of assisted reproduction.
