= Daisy Fancourt =

British psychologist and researcher

- Born: June 1990 (age 36)
- Education: University of Oxford; King's College London; University College London
- Scientific career
- Fields: Mental health Well-being
- Workplaces: University College London; Imperial College London; Chelsea and Westminster Hospital
- Doctoral advisor: Andrew Steptoe; Livia Carvalho
- Website: www.ucl.ac.uk/epidemiology-health-care/people/fancourt

Daisy Fancourt (born June 1990) is a British researcher who is a professor of psychobiology and epidemiology at University College London. Her research focuses on the effects of social connections and behaviours on health, including loneliness, social isolation, community assets, arts and cultural engagement, and social prescribing. During the COVID-19 pandemic in the United Kingdom, Fancourt led a team running the UK's largest study into the psychological and social impact of COVID-19 and established the international network COVID Minds, aiming to better understand the impact of coronavirus disease on mental health and well-being. Fancourt's research has been recognised with fellowships from Wellcome and the British Academy, along with two dozen national and international awards from organisations such as the Leverhulme Trust, Wellcome Trust, British Academy, British Science Association, British Federation of Women Graduates, American Psychosomatic Society, Royal Society for Public Health, UK Research and Innovation, and NHS England. She has been named as a Fellow of the Royal Society for Public Health and the Royal Society of Arts, an ITV Geek of the Week, a BBC New Generation Thinker, and a World Economic Forum Global Shaper. Her popular science book Art Cure was a Sunday Times Bestseller and shortlisted for the Women's Prize for non-fiction 2026. She is listed by Clarivate as one of the most highly cited and influential scientists in the world.

== Early life and education ==
Fancourt earned her bachelor's degree at the University of Oxford and her master's at King's College London in 2012. Fancourt joined the National Health Service, where she worked at the Chelsea and Westminster Hospital on arts and clinical innovations. She eventually returned to academia, and earned her doctoral degree in 2016 at University College London (UCL) where she worked in psychoneuroimmunology.

== Research and career ==
After her PhD, Fancourt moved to Imperial College London as a postdoctoral researcher, where she was based in the Centre for Performance Science from 2013 to 2017. The Centre for Performance Science is a partnership between Imperial College School of Medicine and the Royal College of Music. Fancourt studied the biological impact of the arts, with a particular focus on the use of music in clinical settings. Her work led to the publication of a new theoretical model for how music affects immune response. She also developed and researched a number of new arts programmes to support clinical outcomes, including a community drumming intervention for people with mental illness, a singing programme for mothers with postnatal depression, and a choir programme for people affected by cancer. Some of these programmes have since received clinical commissioning within the National Health Service. At the annual Imperial College London festival, Fancourt analysed the capacity of men and women to play board games while listening to music, and showed that men perform worse when there is rock music in the background. The study was awarded a prize by the Medical Journal of Australia. During her time at Imperial, Fancourt also acted as Director of Research for Breathe Health Research, an organisation that looked to support children with hemiplegia through magic training. For her contributions to science and the arts, Fancourt was made the British Science Association Jacob Bronowski Award Lecturer in 2016.

In 2017 joined University College London as a Wellcome Trust research fellow in epidemiology. During her Fellowship, Fancourt carried out the first epidemiological analyses of arts engagement and health, showing longitudinal associations with incidence and management of a range of mental health conditions and aspects of age-related decline. She also published studies showing how loneliness and social isolation affect neuro-immune markers, cardiovascular events, and hospital admissions for respiratory disease. The same year, Fancourt was selected as one of the BBC Radio 3 Next Generation Thinkers. As part of the award, Fancourt had the opportunity to create content for BBC Radio 3 and BBC Radio 4. In 2018, Fancourt began working with the World Health Organization to develop an agenda that connected the arts, health and well-being. In a report with WHO, Fancourt concluded that arts interventions, including singing in a choir to improve the outcomes of chronic obstructive pulmonary disease, present low-cost treatment options for healthcare workers. The report was named the Global Aesthetic Achievement of 2019. To further global research and policy work on arts and health, in 2021, Fancourt was appointed Director of the WHO Collaborating Centre for Arts & Health.

During the COVID-19 pandemic, Fancourt established the network COVID Minds that looked to better understand the impact of coronavirus disease on mental health. The network collated longitudinal international mental health studies during the pandemic, offering opportunities for researchers to join projects and sharing regular updates with members of the public. Fancourt also led the COVID-19 Social Study, an investigation looking at the social experiences of adults in the United Kingdom during the outbreak. The study collected information on the psychological and social challenges that people in the UK faced during the pandemic. In particular, the COVID-19 Social Study looked to better understand how the virus and enforced social isolation impacted mental health and loneliness. The outcomes of the survey were reported. At the end of April 2020 the social study had over 75,000 participants and by April 2022 had collected over 1.2 million responses. As part of the social study Fancourt also conducted in-depth surveys of over 350 adults, exploring the impact of social isolation. Her results showed that prior to the lockdown officially beginning there was a decline in happiness. However, over the course of April Fancourt showed that levels of well-being had increased and levels of anxiety had decreased. Fancourt was appointed to the Lancet COVID-19 Commission and the WHO Technical Advisory Group on Mental Health in COVID.

In January 2026, Fancourt published the book Art Cure: The Science of How the Arts Transform Our Health with Penguin Random House (UK) and Macmillan (US). The book was endorsed by celebrities including Angela Rippon, Gillian Anderson, Melvyn Bragg, Renée Fleming and Xand van Tulleken. It became an Amazon Bestseller even prior to its publication and a Sunday Times Bestseller after its release. Art Cure was named as the Bookseller's Non-Fiction Book of the Month for January 2026, and listed in The Guardian's "Ones to Watch" list, Blackwell's "Books of 2026", Waterstones' January Best Books round up, The i Paper's "Best new books to read in January 2026", New Scientist's "Best new popular science books of January 2026", Publishers Weekly "Top spring 2026 lifestyle books", and The Echo's new health and wellbeing titles for 2026. It was shortlisted for the 2026 Women's Prize for Non-Fiction.

=== Awards and honours ===
- 2016 British Science Association Jacob Bronowski Award Lecture for Science and the Arts
- 2017 British Academy Rising Star Engagement Award
- 2017 World Economic Forum Global Shaper
- 2017 BBC New Generation Thinker
- 2018 Philip Leverhulme Prize
- 2022 ESRC Outstanding Societal Impact through Research Award

== Selected publications ==
=== Journal articles ===
- Fancourt, Daisy; Ockelford, Adam; Belai, Abi (2014). "The psychoneuroimmunological effects of music: A systematic review and a new model". Brain, Behavior, and Immunity. 36: 15–26. doi:10.1016/j.bbi.2013.10.014. ISSN 0889-1591. PMID 24157429. S2CID 24422549.
- Fancourt, Daisy; Williamon, Aaron; Carvalho, Livia A; Steptoe, Andrew; Dow, Rosie; Lewis, Ian (4 April 2016). "Singing modulates mood, stress, cortisol, cytokine and neuropeptide activity in cancer patients and carers". ecancermedicalscience. 10: 631. doi:10.3332/ecancer.2016.631. ISSN 1754-6605. PMC 4854222. PMID 27170831.
- Fancourt, Daisy; Perkins, Rosie; Ascenso, Sara; Carvalho, Livia A.; Steptoe, Andrew; Williamon, Aaron (14 March 2016). "Effects of Group Drumming Interventions on Anxiety, Depression, Social Resilience and Inflammatory Immune Response among Mental Health Service Users". PLOS ONE. 11 (3) e0151136. Bibcode:2016PLoSO..1151136F. doi:10.1371/journal.pone.0151136. ISSN 1932-6203. PMC 4790847. PMID 26974430. S2CID 1448039.
- Mak, Hei Wan, Taiji Noguchi, Jessica K. Bone, Jacques Wels, Qian Gao, Katsunori Kondo, Tami Saito, and Daisy Fancourt. "Hobby engagement and mental wellbeing among people aged 65 years and older in 16 countries." Nature medicine 29, no. 9 (2023): 2233–2240. doi: 10.1038/s41591-023-02506-1.
- Fancourt, Daisy, et al. "How leisure activities affect health: a narrative review and multi-level theoretical framework of mechanisms of action." The Lancet Psychiatry 8.4 (2021): 329–339. doi:10.1016/S2215-0366(20)30384-9.
- Fancourt, Daisy, Andrew Steptoe, and Feifei Bu. "Trajectories of anxiety and depressive symptoms during enforced isolation due to COVID-19 in England: a longitudinal observational study." The Lancet Psychiatry 8.2 (2021): 141–149. doi: 10.1016/S2215-0366(20)30482-X.
- Paul, Elise, Andrew Steptoe, and Daisy Fancourt. "Attitudes towards vaccines and intention to vaccinate against COVID-19: Implications for public health communications." The Lancet Regional Health - Europe 1 (2021). doi: 10.1016/j.lanepe.2020.100012.
- Fancourt, Daisy, Andrew Steptoe, and Liam Wright. "The Cummings effect: politics, trust, and behaviours during the COVID-19 pandemic." The lancet 396.10249 (2020): 464–465. doi: 10.1016/S0140-6736(20)31690-1.
- Fancourt, Daisy, and Andrew Steptoe. "The art of life and death: 14 year follow-up analyses of associations between arts engagement and mortality in the English Longitudinal Study of Ageing." bmj 367 (2019). doi: 10.1136/bmj.l6377.

=== Books ===
- Fancourt, Daisy (2017). Arts in health: designing and researching interventions. Oxford University Press. ISBN 978-0-19-879207-9. OCLC 1151084210.
- Fancourt, Daisy (2026). Art Cure: The Science of How the Arts Transform Our Health. Cornerstone Press. ISBN 978-1-5299-3553-0.

=== Online contributions ===
- Fancourt, Daisy (15 September 2025), Social prescribing: rethinking health, EXPeditions
- Fancourt, Daisy (15 September 2025), Engaging in the arts for health, EXPeditions
- Fancourt, Daisy (15 September 2025), The loneliness disease, EXPeditions
