= Jane Wardle =

English professor of clinical psychology (1950-2015)

- Born: 30 October 1950; Oxford, England
- Died: 20 October 2015 (aged 64); United Kingdom
- Citizenship: United Kingdom
- Education: St Anne's College, Oxford; King's College London
- Known for: health psychology
- Spouse(s): Nicholas Stirling (1976–?); Andrew Steptoe (1991-2015)
- Children: Lucy Stirling; Matthew Wardle; William Steptoe
- Scientific career
- Fields: clinical psychology, behavioral sciences
- Workplaces: Institute of Psychiatry, King's College London; University College London
- Thesis: (1986)

Jane Wardle FBA FMedSci (30 October 1950 – 20 October 2015) was a professor of clinical psychology and director of the Cancer Research UK Health Behaviour Research Centre at University College London. She was one of the pioneers of health psychology in the UK and internationally, known for her seminal work on the contribution of psychology to public health, particularly the role of psychological research in cancer prevention and work on the behavioural and genetic determinants of eating behaviour and obesity.

Wardle was also noted as a public health policy campaigner, and for the frank way she wrote about her own cancer diagnosis.

== Early life ==
Frances Jane Wardle was born in Oxford, England to Marcella (née Brough) and Peter Wardle, a portrait artist, the eldest of four children. The family had little money, moved often, and the parents were frequently unavailable; her mother underwent lengthy hospitalisations due to mental illness and her father, who she "was deeply attached to [..] was often absent", to the point that Jane and her siblings spent several months in a children's home and Jane assumed parental responsibilities early on.

After a disrupted education involving 13 different schools, she requested admission to Oxford High School, which was granted and was even allowed to live in the house of the headmistress Mary Warnock, Baroness Warnock from time to time. She subsequently studied at St Anne's College, Oxford, graduating with a BA in psychology and physiology in 1973. She moved to the King's College London's Institute of Psychiatry where she completed training in clinical psychology.

== Career ==
Wardle was appointed as a lecturer at the Institute of Psychiatry in 1976. She completed her PhD in 1986, and in 1987 was promoted to senior lecturer in clinical psychology and consultant clinical psychologist at the Institute of Psychiatry and King's College London. Her tasks were teaching, clinical practice and occasional research. Martin Jarvis, emeritus professor of health psychology, a colleague and friend for 40 years said "I like to think I played a part in persuading her to go on and study whole populations."

In 1991, she shifted to full-time research when appointed senior scientist at the Imperial Cancer Research Fund (ICRF) Health Behaviour Unit and Reader in clinical psychology at the Institute of Psychiatry.

In 1997, Wardle took over as director of the ICRF Centre for Health Behaviour Research and was responsible for moving it from the Institute of Psychiatry to the Department of Epidemiology and Public Health at University College London. When she became director, the Centre had 8 members, but is now the largest concentration of health psychology research in the UK with more than 60 staff. It has core support from three Cancer Research UK programme grants, and additional funding from the MRC, BBSRC, National Institute for Health Research, INRA, and EU FP7.

Jane Wardle was founding editor of the British Journal of Health Psychology.

== Research ==
Wardle made significant contributions to several fields of research, but three are particularly notable. First, she was influential in applying psychological methods in cancer research, specifically in understanding the uptake of cancer screening, early detection, the acceptability of prevention methods, and the development of theoretically-driven interventions designed to improve screening participation, particularly in underprivileged groups. Her work on increasing public acceptability of human papillomavirus vaccination paved the way for the national vaccination programme, and she was a key member of the team that established the value of flexible sigmoidoscopy for the prevention of colorectal cancer. This work led to a change in national screening policy. Her contributions to this field were reflected in her appointment as deputy director of the Department of Health Policy Research Unit on cancer awareness, screening and early diagnosis.

A second major theme of her research was eating behaviour and obesity. Her work highlighted the importance of eating styles (notably satiety sensitivity) and established that the FTO gene contributes to obesity in part through effects on eating behaviour styles. This stimulated Wardle to set up a new population-based twin cohort to investigate diet, physical activity and weight from birth to 5 years. Her research on eating behaviour in children combined large scale observational studies with experimental intervention studies, and led to the development of new methods of promoting fruit and vegetable consumption in children. Work on food choice in adults includes the development of key measures of motives for food choice and nutrition knowledge, together with the formulation of novel habit-based interventions that are being tested for weight management in overweight and obese adults in primary care clinical trials.

A third area of research was the role of positive well-being and positive affect in physical health, and involved epidemiological studies of positive affect and survival, together with more detailed work on the biological correlates of positive well-being.

She contributed to several other topics, including the investigation of the influence of socioeconomic status and stress on behaviours such as physical activity, smoking and food choice, and international studies of health behaviour in young people.

== Policy advocacy ==
As a campaigner, Wardle sought to ensure the insights from health psychology research were translated into effective public health policy. Wardle set up a charity called Weight Concern in 1997 to tackle the rising problem of obesity; which won the Best New Charity Award in 2002, and is continuing to offer support and advice to individuals and the UK NHS. In 2009, Wardle appeared in BBC Horizon: Why Are Thin People Not Fat? (season 45, episode 8), a documentary which examined why some people manage to stay slim while the world is being affected by an obesity epidemic. In it, she explored whether eating habits are genetic or learned.

== Honours ==
- 1989 Fellow, British Psychological Society
- 2004 Fellow, Academy of Social Sciences
- 2005 Fellow, Society for Behavioral Medicine
- 2007 Member, Academia Europaea
- 2007 Fellow, Academy of Behavioral Medicine Research
- 2011 Fellow, Association for Psychological Science
- 2012 Fellow, Academy of Medical Sciences
- 2013 Fellow, British Academy
- 2014 Award, British Psychological Society, for outstanding contributions to research

== Personal life ==
In 1976 Wardle married Nicholas Stirling, with whom she had daughter Lucy Stirling, and later divorced from. In 1991 she married Andrew Steptoe, had son Matthew Wardle and adopted stepson William Steptoe. She lived in Marylebone, London.

Wardle was diagnosed with chronic lymphocytic leukaemia at the age of 46, three months after taking over as director of a unit carrying out psychological research into the prevention of cancer. She wrote with frankness about how she reacted to the diagnosis, which was left on her answering machine, and how she initially coped by regressing "to the 'sex, drugs and rock'n'roll' of my youth in the Sixties".

She died from complications of the disease on 20 October 2015, almost 20 years after her diagnosis, survived by husband, Andrew Steptoe, her children, 3 grandchildren and her father Peter Wardle.
