= Andrew Steptoe =

British psychologist and epidemiologist

Andrew Steptoe OBE FBA FAcSS FMedSci MAE
- Born: Andrew Patrick Arthur Steptoe; 24 April 1951 (age 75); London, England
- Education: Uppingham School
- Alma mater: University of Cambridge (BA); University of Oxford (DPhil)
- Scientific career
- Workplaces: University College London
- Thesis: The Self-Control of Blood Pressure Using Biofeedback and Instructions (1975)
- Doctoral students: Daisy Fancourt
- Website: www.ucl.ac.uk/epidemiology-health-care/people/steptoe

Andrew Patrick Arthur Steptoe (born 24 April 1951) is a British psychologist and epidemiologist in the Department of Behavioural Science and Health at University College London. He is a pioneer in health psychology and behavioural medicine in the UK and internationally, known for his work on psychosocial factors in cardiovascular disease, ageing, and positive wellbeing and health.

== Early life and education ==
Andrew Patrick Arthur Steptoe was born at St George's Hospital, Hyde Park Corner, London, the son of Patrick Steptoe, the obstetrician and gynaecologist responsible for the first IVF birth and Sheena (née Kennedy), an actress. He was brought up in Rochdale, Lancs, and was educated at Uppingham School. He won a choral exhibition to Gonville and Caius College, Cambridge, from which he graduated with a First Class degree in Natural Sciences in 1972. He subsequently moved to Magdalen College, Oxford, where in 1976 he completed a DPhil on biofeedback and cardiovascular disease in the department of psychiatry.

== Career and research ==
Steptoe was appointed a lecturer at Christ Church, Oxford, held concurrently with a Medical Research Council Training Fellowship in 1975. He resigned these posts in 1977 to take up a lectureship in the newly formed Department of Psychology at St. George's Hospital Medical School in 1977. He continued to work at St. George's for 22 years, and was promoted to senior lecturer in 1981 and to Reader in 1987, before being appointed professor and head of department in 1988. His teaching of psychology to medical students resulted in a textbook Essential Psychology for Medical Practice. In 1983, he was appointed project leader of a Concerted Action on Breakdown in Human Adaptation by the Commission of the European Communities DG XII, continuing this work coordinating projects on stress and health across Europe until 1991.

He was involved in the early international development of behavioural medicine. He was chair of the scientific program committee for the first International Congress of Behavioral Medicine (Uppsala, 1990), and served as President of the International Society of Behavioral Medicine from 1994 to 1996. Steptoe was also involved in the professional development of health psychology in the UK. He was a founding member of the Division of Health Psychology of the British Psychological Society, and was founding editor (in collaboration with Jane Wardle) of the British Journal of Health Psychology from 1995 to 2001. He was also associate editor of Psychophysiology (1982–1986), the Journal of Psychophysiology (1987–1989), the Journal of Psychosomatic Research (1989–1997), the Annals of Behavioral Medicine (1992–1997), the British Journal of Clinical Psychology (1992–1995), and the International Journal of Rehabilitation and Health (1995–2002). He has served on the editorial boards of 14 other international journals. Steptoe was awarded a DSc by London University in 1995.

In 2000, Steptoe moved to the Department of Epidemiology and Public Health at University College London to become the first British Heart Foundation professor of psychology, a post he held until 2016. He was appointed Head of the Department of Epidemiology and Public Health in 2010, before becoming director of the Institute of Epidemiology and Health Care at University College London (2011–2017). In 2017, the Department of Behavioural Science and Health was created at UCL and Steptoe was Head of Department from 2017-2024. He has been Director of the English Longitudinal Study of Ageing since 2010. He was previously programme director of the Health Psychology MSc at UCL.

Steptoe has made significant contributions to several aspects of health psychology and behavioural medicine. He has been involved in the identification of the psychobiological pathways that link population-level risk factors such as low socioeconomic status and work stress with atherogenesis and cardiovascular disease progression. He has advanced understanding of the biological influence of psychosocial factors, by discovering that inflammatory cytokines and haemostatic factors respond acutely to mental stress, and that rates of post-stress recovery in biological measures differ critically across psychosocial risk groups. He has also advanced the theoretical underpinning of psychobiological processes, building on allostatic theory to formulate a taxonomy of autonomic, neuroendocrine, inflammatory, and immune pathways through which life experiences influence disease risk. Steptoe is involved in research on the determinants of healthy lifestyles, the relation of depression to physical health, and links between mental health and physical activity. Additionally, as principal investigator of the English Longitudinal Study of Ageinghe has promoted the interdisciplinary investigation of population ageing, contributing to understanding of the impact of social isolation and loneliness on health, and the relationship between subjective wellbeing and health at older ages. He is the author of more than 1,000 articles, and author/editor of 25 books.

=== Music and cultural history work ===
Steptoe has also contributed to cultural and musical studies. He has written several articles and a book on the cultural background of Mozart operas, together with a general biography of Mozart in which the text was coupled with recordings of his work. He edited a collection of studies of creativity and temperament in the historical record, and has contributed research on Renaissance and 18th century history. With Ruth Edwards, he coedited the second edition of A Matter of Life, an account of the development of IVF by his father Patrick Steptoe and Nobel laureate Robert Edwards.

=== Awards and honours ===
- 1988 Fellow, British Psychological Society
- 2001 Fellow, Academy of Social Sciences (FAcSS)
- 2003 Member, Academia Europaea (MAE)
- 2007 Elected a Fellow of the Academy of Medical Sciences (FMedSci)
- 2010 Fellow, Academy of Behavioral Medicine Research
- 2011 Contributions in Positive Health Award, International Positive Psychology Association
- 2014 Fellow, Gerontological Society of America
- 2017 Patricia Barchas Award for Sociophysiology, American Psychosomatic Society
- 2018, 2019, 2020, 2021, 2022, 2023, 2024, 2025 Highly Cited Researcher, Web of Science
- 2018 Fellow, Royal Society of Biology
- 2021 Fellow, British Academy
- 2023 Fellow, Society for Biopsychosocial Science and Medicine (formerly American Psychosomatic Society)
- 2025 Lifetime Achievement Award, Academy of Behavioral Medicine Research
- 2025 Distinguished Scientist Award, Society for Biopsychosocial Science and Medicine (formerly American Psychosomatic Society)
- 2025 Outstanding Achievement Award, British Society of Gerontology
- 2026 OBE for Services to Behavioural Science
