= Ricardo Miledi =

Mexican neuroscientist

- Known for: deciphering the role of calcium in neurotransmitter release

Ricardo Miledi (15 September 1927 – 18 December 2017) was a Mexican neuroscientist known for his work deciphering the role of calcium in neurotransmitter release. He also helped to develop a technique for studying native receptors in frog oocytes for drug development.

== Life ==
One of seven children, he received undergraduate and medical degrees at National Autonomous University of Mexico (UNAM). While in medical school, he decided that he would make a "terrible clinician", as "he imagined that he would end up seeing only one patient per week, because he would always be too interested in every unknown detail of the case, trying to work out how medicines might act." As a result, when required to perform social service as a component of his training in medical school, he chose a research fellowship at the "Instituto Nacional de Cardiología" under Arturo Rosenblueth. There, he studied the electrical origins of ventricular fibrillation and became skilled at delicate laboratory work.

In 1955, he spent a summer at the Marine Biological Laboratory at Wood's Hole. There, he began his study of synapses in the common squid and began to see the importance of calcium in synaptic transmission. Around 1956/1957 Miledi conducted research in Canberra, Australia.

In 1958, he met frequent collaborator, Noble Laureate Bernard Katz, who offered him a position in the Department of Biophysics at University College London. There, he studied the release of Acetylcholine (ACh) and the expression of its receptors. From these studies, he introduced evidence of a phenomenon known as spillover, in which neurotransmitters diffuse away and stimulate extrasynaptic receptors. Further work on extrasynaptic receptors led to the development of the concept of neuromodulation. This laid the groundwork for future studies in neurotrophic factors, which would ultimately lead to his work in denervation. By studying denervation in frog skeletal muscle, it was discovered that glial cells, particularly Schwann cells, behave as neurotrophic factors by taking on neuronal activity and releasing Acetylcholine themselves in order to preserve the neuromuscular junction.

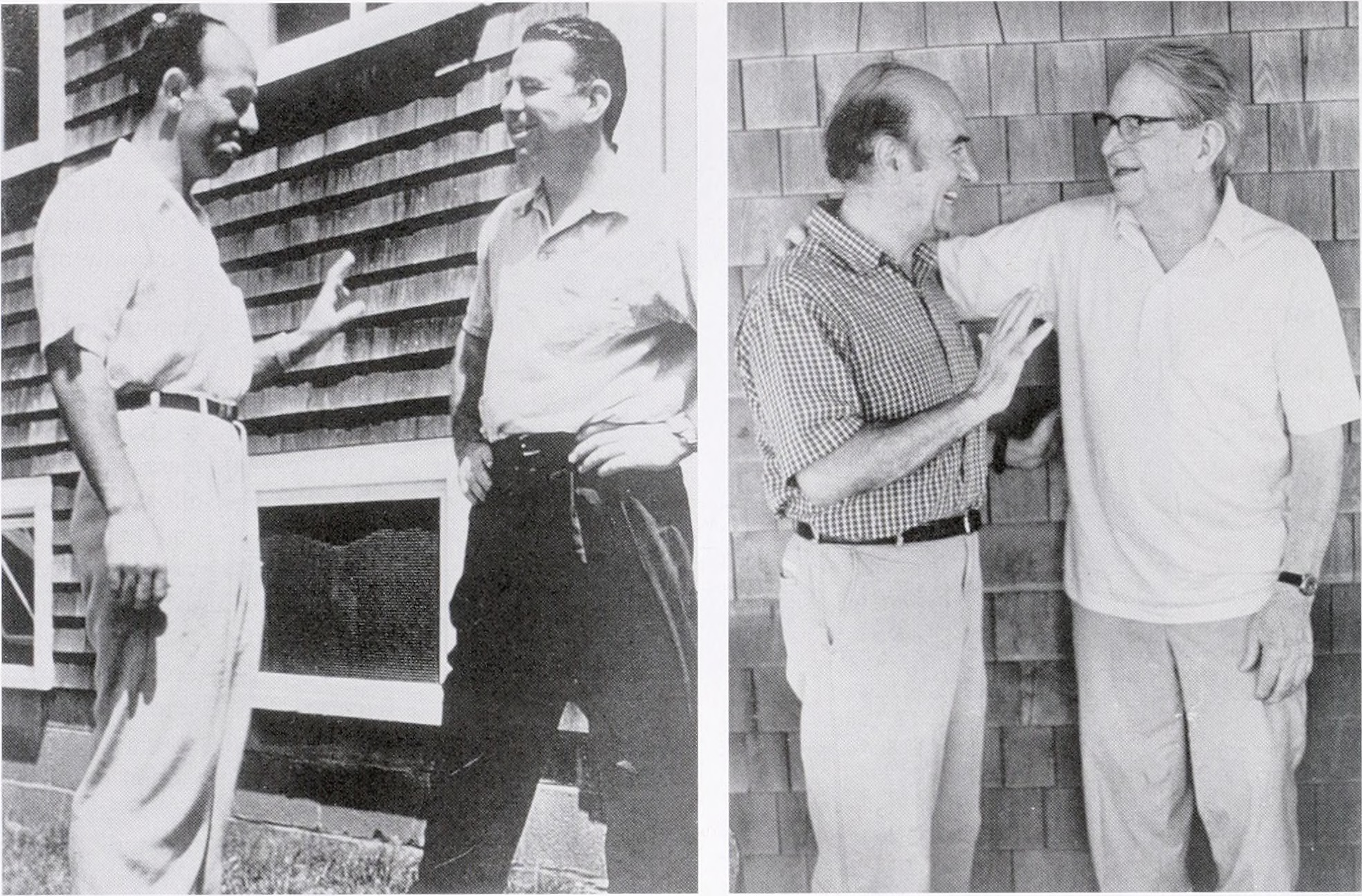
Ricardo Miledi (left) and Albert Grass (right) when Miledi was a fellow for the Grass foundation (left image), taken in 1955. Ricardo Miledi (left) and Albert Grass (right) in a recreation of the first image taken in 1990.

In the early 1960s, he again became interested in the role of calcium. He found that "in zero-Ca^{2+} medium, the nerve impulse still fully invades the nerve terminal, but does not release any neurotransmitter. And then as soon as you give a little Ca^{2+}, you get neurotransmitter release." He and Katz published a paper establishing the major role of Ca^{2+} in ACh release. Further work with squid contributed to an even better understanding of the role of Ca^{2+} in neurotransmitter release.

Miledi was elected as a fellow to the British Royal Society in 1970. During the early 1970s Miledi was a frequent research scientist during the summer months at the Stazione Zoologica in Naples, Italy ostensibly as the local squid made excellent research specimens. He is also one of the 42 founding fellows of The World Academy of Sciences in 1983, to recognize outstanding scientists from developing countries and honour their achievements in research and development.

Miledi was a Distinguished Professor at University of California, Irvine; having joined the faculty in the early 1980s. While there, he spent time developing a technique called microtransplantation, which would allow researchers to study receptors from postmortem diseased human brain tissue in a functional model. He developed this technique based on earlier work in which he performed the first electrophysiological recording of a frog oocyte, discovering its inherent property of already having neurotransmitter receptors.

From the 1990s until his death he was Distinguished Professor at UNAM's Institute of Neurobiology, in Querétaro, Mexico.

His awards include the Royal Medal (1998), the King Faisal International Prize for Science (1988), the Prince of Asturias Award (1999), and the Society for Neuroscience's Ralph W. Gerard Prize for outstanding contributions to the field (2010).

== See also ==
- Rodolfo Llinás
- Stazione Zoologica Napoli
