= Bourn Hall Clinic =

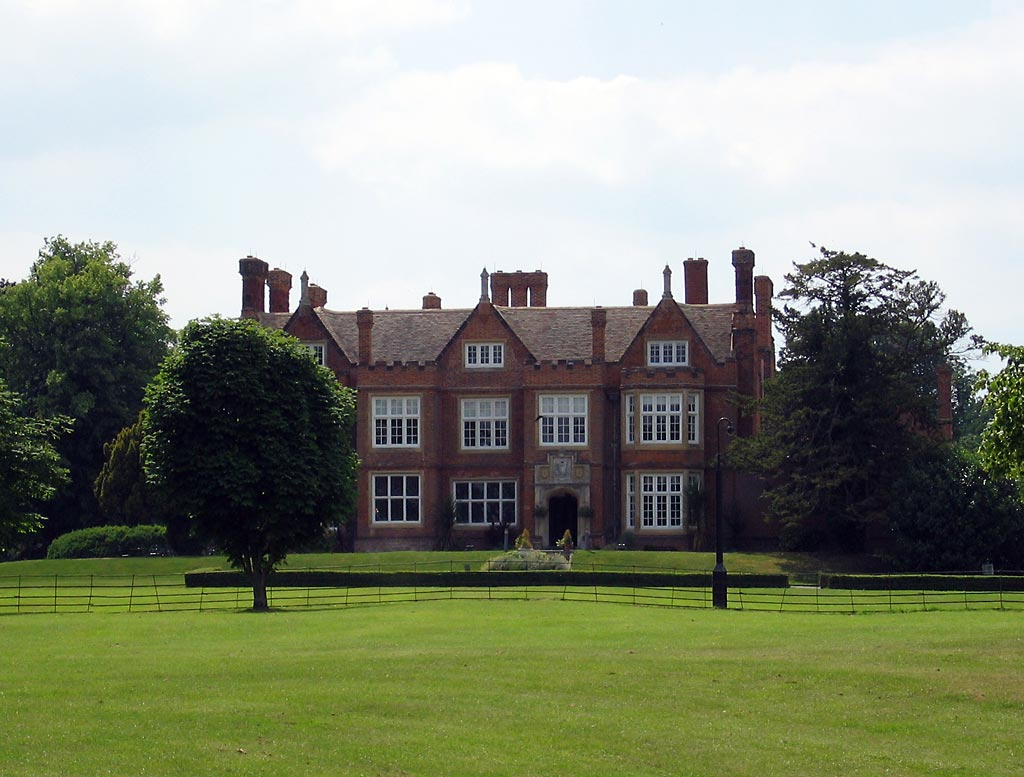
- Bourn Hall Clinic

Geography
- Location: Bourn, Cambridgeshire, England
- Coordinates: 52°11′18″N 0°04′03″W

Organisation
- Type: Specialist

Services
- Speciality: Infertility

History
- Opened: 1980

Links
- Website: www.bournhall.co.uk
- Lists: Hospitals in England

Bourn Hall Clinic in Bourn, Cambridgeshire, England, is a centre for the treatment of infertility. The original building, Bourn Hall, is about 400 years old. Since becoming a medical centre, it has been greatly extended.

== History ==
Bourn Hall Clinic was founded in 1980 by IVF pioneers Mr Patrick Steptoe, embryologist Jean Purdy and Professor Robert Edwards, who were responsible for the conception of Louise Brown, the world's first IVF or test-tube baby in 1977.

Bourn Hall Clinic is one of five fertility centres selected by the NHS East of England Specialised Commissioning Group to provide treatment to patients in the region. As of 1 May 2009, childless couples in Cambridgeshire, Norfolk, Suffolk, Essex, Bedfordshire and Hertfordshire will be able to access up to three cycles of IVF, plus a further three frozen embryo transfers.

A breakthrough that occurred in Bourn Hall’s early days was the application of cryobiology to IVF, allowed embryos to be frozen for transfer at a later date. The first "frozen babies" were born in 1984. Bourn Hall also led the way in offering in vitro fertilisation surrogacy. They treated the first couple in the United Kingdom in 1988 and the first IVF surrogacy child was born in 1989.

More recently, Bourn Hall pioneered the use of blastocyst culture, where the embryo is grown for up to five days prior to implantation. This increases the chances of IVF success.

In 2009, Bourn Hall acquired the former ISIS Fertility Centre in Colchester, Essex which has enabled more convenient access to both NHS and self funded fertility treatments for patients from the Essex and Suffolk regions.

A plaque was unveiled at the Clinic in July 2013 by Louise Brown and Alastair MacDonald—the world's first IVF baby boy—commemorating Steptoe and Edwards. The plaque missed out Jean Purdy who had been the person who chose Bourn Hall, was a co-founder of the clinic and an equal partner in developing IVF. In 2018, to mark the 40th anniversary of IVF, the clinic unveiled an additional memorial to Jean Purdy, the "world's first IVF nurse and embryologist. Co-founder of Bourn Hall Clinic".

The current Science Director, appointed in January 2018, is Martyn Blayney MSc, DIP RCPath.
