= Louise Brown =

First person conceived by IVF (born 1978)

- Born: Louise Joy Brown; 25 July 1978 (age 48); Oldham, Greater Manchester, England
- Known for: First person conceived by in vitro fertilisation
- Spouse: Wesley Mullinder (m. 2004)
- Children: 2

Louise Joy Brown (born 25 July 1978) is an English woman noted as the first human born following conception by in vitro fertilisation (IVF). Her birth, following a procedure pioneered in Britain, has been lauded among "the most remarkable medical breakthroughs of the 20th century".

== Life ==
Brown's parents, Lesley and John Brown, had been trying to conceive naturally for nine years but Lesley faced complications from blocked fallopian tubes. On 10 November 1977, Lesley underwent the procedure that later became known as in vitro fertilisation (IVF), developed by Patrick Steptoe, Robert Edwards, and Jean Purdy. The media would often refer to Brown as a "test tube baby", however, her conception actually took place in a Petri dish. Purdy was the first to see Brown's embryonic cells dividing.

Louise Joy Brown was born on 25 July 1978 at Oldham's General Hospital, via a planned caesarean section performed by John Webster. She weighed 5 pounds, 12 ounces (2.608 kg) at birth. In 1982, Brown's sister Natalie was born after also being conceived through IVF, becoming the world's 40th such live birth; in May 1999, Natalie became the first human conceived by IVF to herself give birth, though she did so without IVF.

In 2004, Brown married nightclub doorman Wesley Mullinder; Edwards, the only surviving member from the trio who pioneered IVF, attended their wedding. Their first son, conceived naturally, was born on 20 December 2006. She has since had another child. Brown's father died in 2006 at the age of 64, while her mother died in 2012 due to complications from a gallbladder infection, also at the age of 64.

== Recognition ==
Brown's birth has been lauded as one of the "most remarkable medical breakthroughs of the 20th century".

Edwards was awarded the 2010 Nobel Prize in Medicine for this work.

In 2019, Time created 89 new covers to celebrate women of the year starting from 1920; it chose Lesley Brown for 1978.

In 2022, a plaque was installed on Royal Oldham Hospital to record the importance of Purdy and Sister Muriel Harris to the work.

== Ethical and religious issues ==
Although the Browns knew the procedure was experimental, the doctors did not tell them that no case had yet resulted in a baby, prompting questions of informed consent.

In 1978, when asked for his reaction to Brown's birth, Catholic Cardinal Albino Luciani (who was then the Patriarch of Venice and later became Pope John Paul I) expressed concerns about the possibility that artificial insemination could lead to women being used as "baby factories" but also noted that the Browns simply wanted to have a baby and refused to condemn them.

== Publications ==
- Brown, Louise; Powell, Martin (2015). Louise Brown: My Life As the World's First Test-Tube Baby. Wraxall: Bristol Books CIC. ISBN 978-1-909446-08-3. OCLC 1023273709. Bristol Archives Bk/2552.
