= Patrick Steptoe =

English gynaecologist (1913–1988)

Patrick Steptoe CBE FRS
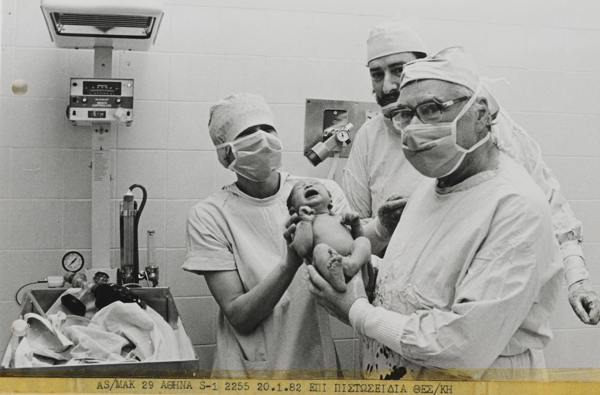
- Steptoe (right) holds the first child born in Greece via in vitro fertilisation
- Born: Patrick Christopher Steptoe; 9 June 1913; Oxford, England
- Died: 21 March 1988 (aged 74); Canterbury, England
- Education: King's College London; St George's Hospital Medical School
- Known for: In vitro fertilisation
- Spouse: Sheena Kennedy (m. 1943)
- Children: 2, including Andrew Steptoe
- Awards: CBE; FRS
- Scientific career
- Fields: Obstetrics; Gynaecology
- Workplaces: Oldham General Hospital; Bourn Hall Clinic

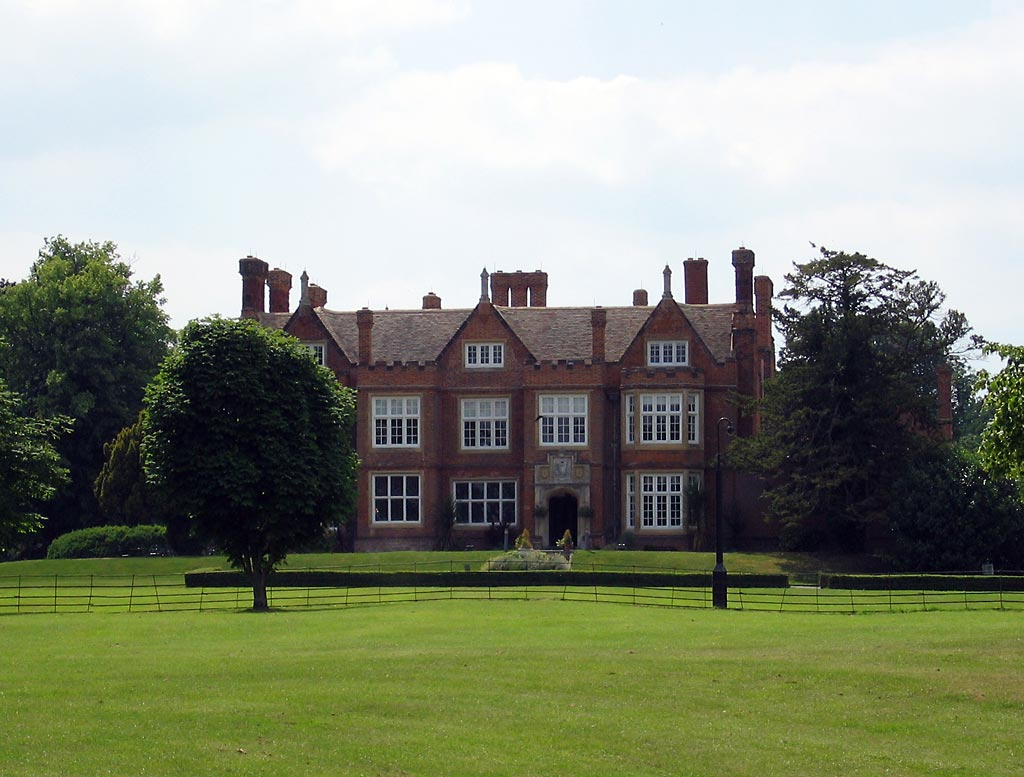
Bourn Hall Clinic

Patrick Christopher Steptoe CBE FRS (9 June 1913 – 21 March 1988) was an English obstetrician and gynaecologist and a pioneer of fertility treatment. Steptoe was responsible with biologist and physiologist Robert Edwards and the nurse and embryologist Jean Purdy for developing in vitro fertilisation. Louise Joy Brown, the first test-tube baby, was born on 25 July 1978. Edwards was awarded the 2010 Nobel Prize in Physiology or Medicine for his work on the development of in vitro fertilisation; Steptoe and Purdy were not eligible for consideration because the Nobel Prize is not awarded posthumously.

== Education ==
Patrick Christopher Steptoe was born on 19 June 1913. Born in Oxford, Steptoe was educated at The Grammar School, Witney (since 1968 the comprehensive Henry Box School) in Oxfordshire. He went to King's College London and graduated from St George's Hospital Medical School, London in 1939. He served in the Royal Navy from 1939–1946 and attained the rank of Lieutenant Commander.

From 1947 to 1949 he was chief assistant in obstetrics and gynaecology at St. George's Hospital, then senior registrar at the Whittington Hospital (formerly known as Highgate Hospital) and obtained his FRCS(Ed) in 1950. His chief at Highgate, Kathleen Harding, was credited by Steptoe as teaching him a great deal about the management of infertility.

== Laparoscopy pioneer ==
After the Second World War, he studied obstetrics and, in 1951 he started to work at the Oldham & District General Hospital. From Raoul Palmer he learned the technique of laparoscopy and promoted its usefulness. In 1967 he published Laparoscopy in Gynaecology. Subsequently, Robert Edwards, a physiologist from the University of Cambridge, contacted him and got him interested in collaborating in the development of in vitro fertilization.

== Work with Edwards ==
Steptoe became the Director of the Centre for Human Reproduction, Oldham, in 1969. Using laparoscopy, he collected the ova from volunteering infertile women who saw his place as their last hope to achieve a pregnancy. Edwards and Jean Purdy provided the laboratory expertise. During this time they had to endure criticism and hostility to their work. Finally, in 1978, the birth of Louise Brown changed everything. Although he encountered further criticism, other clinics were able to follow the lead and patients responded. To accommodate the increased patient number and train specialists, he, Purdy, and Edwards founded the Bourn Hall Clinic, Cambridgeshire in 1980 of which Steptoe was a Medical Director until his death.

== Awards and honours ==
In 1979, Steptoe received the Golden Plate Award of the American Academy of Achievement.

In the 1988 New Year Honours, he was appointed Commander of the Most Excellent Order of the British Empire (CBE), just a week after the 1,000th test-tube baby, conceived with his help, was born.

Steptoe was elected a Fellow of the Royal Society in March 1987. His nomination reads:

Steptoe was the first in Britain to use laparoscopy for the routine diagnosis of gynaecological disorders, and the first anywhere to use it as a standard technique for sterilization. He sought to develop it for the treatment of infertility and, by 1969, succeeded in using it for the first time to recover oocytes from preovulatory ovaries. During the next ten years he recovered many oocytes, which were fertilized and nurtured by Edwards, and implanted them in the uterus through the cervix uteri, thus helping to clarify many fundamental aspects of human ovulation, fertilization, and implantation. After more than 100 attempts a pregnancy was obtained which was carried to term. Now the technique, as used by Steptoe and others, is so successful that almost a third of women accepted for treatment have healthy infants. His achievement is particularly remarkable as it was obtained in a district hospital with only local backing.

A plaque was unveiled at the Bourn Hall Clinic in July 2013 by Louise Brown and Alastair MacDonald – the world's first IVF baby boy – commemorating Steptoe and Edwards. Steptoe is also commemorated with a plaque at the Maternity Ward at the Royal Oldham Hospital, and at 52 West End, Witney.

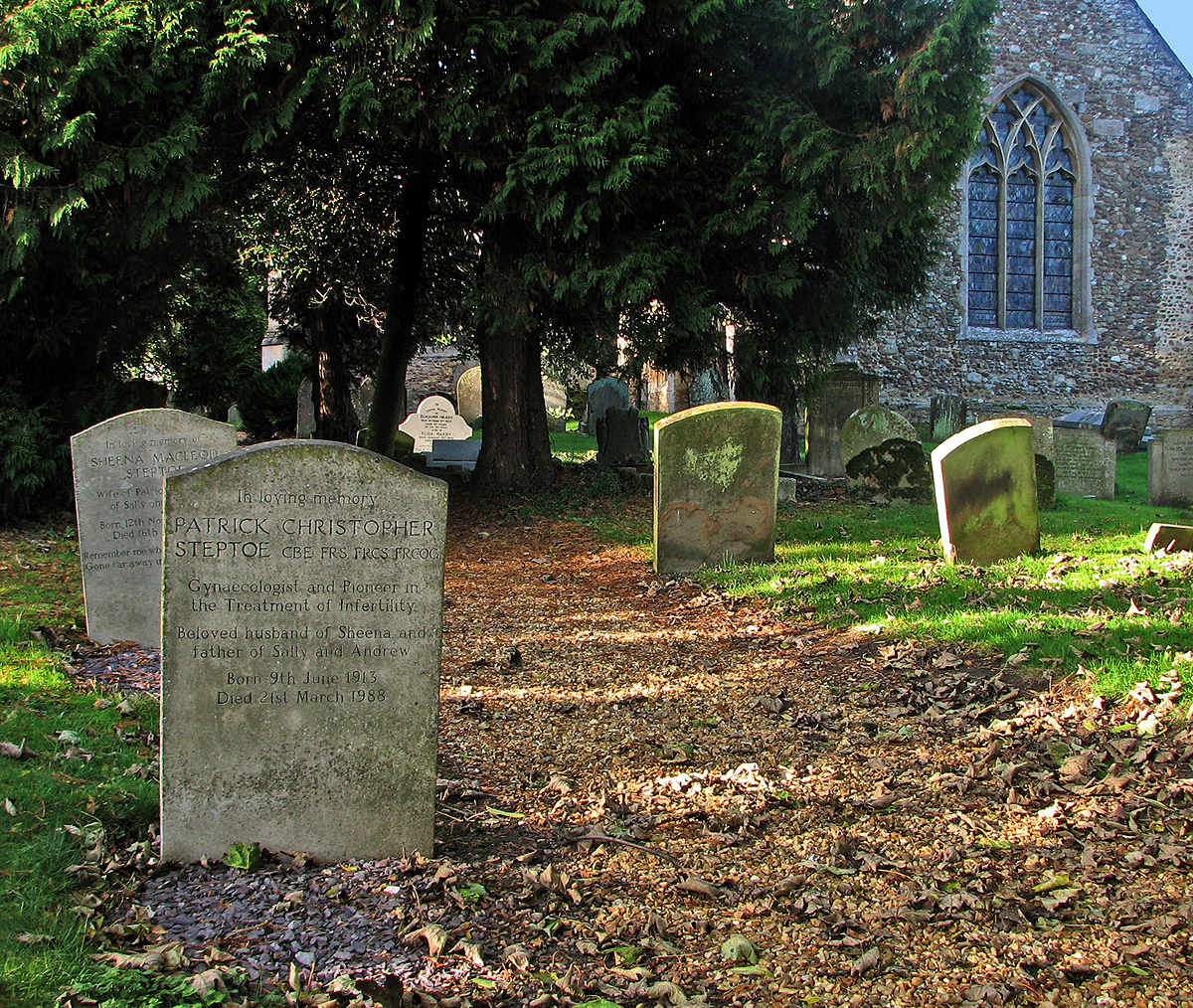
Steptoe's grave in Bourn churchyard

Steptoe is buried in Bourn, St Helena and St Mary Churchyard.

== In popular culture ==
Steptoe, Edwards, and Purdy work was dramatised in Gareth Farr's 2024 play A Child of Science, which premiered at Bristol Old Vic; Steptoe was portrayed by Jamie Glover.

In the 2024 biographical film Joy, Steptoe is portrayed by Bill Nighy.
