= Molecule Island =

Molecule Islands
- Location within Antarctica

Geography
- Location: Antarctica
- Coordinates: 66°28′S 66°24′W

Administration
- Administered under the Antarctic Treaty System

Demographics
- Population: Uninhabited

Molecule Island is the easternmost of the Bragg Islands, lying in Crystal Sound 14 kilometres (7.5 nmi) north of Cape Rey, Graham Land, Antarctica. It was mapped from surveys by the Falkland Islands Dependencies Survey in 1958–59. The name arose from association with Atom Rock in the same group.

== See also ==
- List of Antarctic and sub-Antarctic islands
