= Vagrant Island =

Island in Graham Land, Antarctica

- Location within Antarctica

Geography
- Location: Antarctica
- Coordinates: 66°28′S 66°28′W

Administration
- Administered under the Antarctic Treaty System

Demographics
- Population: Uninhabited

Vagrant Island is the northern of two islands just west of Rambler Island in the Bragg Islands, lying in Crystal Sound about 13.9 kilometres (7.5 nmi) north of Cape Rey, Graham Land. Mapped from surveys by Falkland Islands Dependencies Survey (FIDS) (1958–59). The name derives from association with Rambler Island.

== See also ==
- List of Antarctic and sub-Antarctic islands
