= Henri A. Levy =

American physicist and crystallographer

Henri A. Levy (September 12, 1913 – March 25, 2003) was an American physicist and crystallographer who made contributions in the field of neutron scattering by crystalline materials.

== Early life and education ==
Levy was born in Oxnard, California and gained both his bachelor's degree and PhD at Caltech, in 1935 and 1938 respectively. His PhD was supervised by Linus Pauling.

== Career ==
Following a postdoctoral position with Pauling, Levy moved to Clinton Laboratories (now Oak Ridge National Laboratory) where he spent the rest of his career. He built on the work of Ernest O. Wollan and Clifford G. Shull in determining the structure of crystalline solids such as Xenon tetrafluoride, sucrose and glucose using neutron diffraction. His work particularly focused on determining the positions of hydrogen atoms in crystals, something that neutron diffraction can do with higher precision than X-ray diffraction. He pioneered automated methodology for neutron diffraction studies, along with several computer programs for analysis of crystallographic data. He was president of the American Crystallographic Association in 1965. In his later life, Levy worked on electron tomography of large biological complexes, particularly those transcribing DNA.

== Legacy ==
Levy Island, in Crystal Sound, Antarctica, is named in honor of Levy's 1957 work with SW Peterson determining the position of hydrogen atoms in an ice crystal using neutrons.
