= Fowler Islands =

Group of islands in Antarctica

The Fowler Islands (66°25′S 66°26′W) are a group of small islands lying between the Bernal Islands and the Bragg Islands in Crystal Sound, off the coast of Antarctica. They were mapped from air photos obtained by the Ronne Antarctic Research Expedition (1947–48) and the Falkland Islands and Dependencies Aerial Survey Expedition (1956–57), and from surveys by the Falkland Islands Dependencies Survey (1958–59). They were named by the UK Antarctic Place-Names Committee for Sir Ralph H. Fowler (1889–1944), an English physicist, joint author with J.D. Bernal of a classic paper in 1933 on the structure of ice which suggested the location of the hydrogen atoms now known as the ice rules.

== See also ==
- List of Antarctic and sub-Antarctic islands
