= Owston =

Owston may refer to:

- Owston, Leicestershire, England
- Owston Ferry, a village in Lincolnshire, England
- Owston, South Yorkshire, England
- Owston Islands in Antarctica

== People with the surname ==
- Alan Owston, naturalist
- George Owston, English cricketer
- P. G. Owston (1921–2001), British chemist and crystallographer for whom the Owston Islands in Antarctica are named
- John de St Paul (c. 1295 – 1362), who was also known as John de Owston, the Archbishop of Dublin and Chancellor of Ireland

== See also ==
- Owston's green tree frog
- Owston's palm civet
- Owston's chimaera
- Owston's tit
- Doug Owston Correctional Centre
- Owston's Buildings
