= Nakaya =

Nakaya (written: 中谷, 仲谷 or 中矢) is a Japanese surname. Notable people with the surname include:

- Akihiko Nakaya (中谷 明彦, born 1957), Japanese racing driver
- Fujiko Nakaya (中谷 芙二子, born 1933), Japanese artist
- Katsuhiko Nakaya (born 1957), Brazilian sprinter
- Kazuhiro Nakaya (仲谷 一宏, born 1945), Japanese ichthyologist
- Riki Nakaya (中矢 力, born 1989), Japanese judoka
- Sayaka Nakaya (仲谷 明香, born 1991), Japanese voice actress, singer and idol
- Ukichiro Nakaya (中谷 宇吉郎, 1900–1962), Japanese physicist and writer
- Yuhi Nakaya (中谷 雄飛, born 1999), Japanese long-distance runner

== See also ==
- Nakaya Islands, an island group of Graham Land, Antarctica
- Nakaya Fountain Pens
- Nakatani, other Japanese surnames using the same kanji 中谷 or 仲谷.
