= Atom Rock =

Feature of UK Antarctic territory

Atom Rock (66°28′S 66°26′W) is an insular rock 0.5 miles (0.8 km) northeast of Rambler Island in the Bragg Islands, lying in Crystal Sound off the west coast of Graham Land. It was mapped from surveys by the Falkland Islands Dependencies Survey (1958–59), and named by the UK Antarctic Place-Names Committee in association with Bragg Islands. It is one of many named Rock formations of Graham Land.
