= Rambler Harbour =

Harbour in Western Antarctica

Rambler Harbour (66°28′S 66°27′W) is a small harbour in the north side of Rambler Island, Bragg Islands, in Crystal Sound in Antarctica. First mapped and named by Commander W.M. Carey, Royal Navy, of the Discovery II (1930–31). The location of the harbour was in doubt for several years, but in 1958 was reidentified and surveyed by Falkland Islands Dependencies Survey (FIDS).
