= Dennison Reef =

Dennison Reef (66°29′S 66°50′W) is a reef between the Shull Rocks and the Pauling Islands, lying east of the south end of the Biscoe Islands in Crystal Sound. It was mapped from air photos obtained by the Ronne Antarctic Research Expedition (1947–48) and from surveys by the Falkland Islands Dependencies Survey (1958–59). It was named by the UK Antarctic Place-Names Committee for David M. Dennison, a physicist who took x-ray diffraction pictures which were used to interpret the crystal structure of ice.
