= Rambler Island =

Island in Graham Land, Antarctica

Rambler Island (66°28′S 66°27′W) is the largest of the Bragg Islands, lying in Crystal Sound about 7.5 nautical miles (14 km) north of Cape Rey, Graham Land. Mapped from surveys by Falkland Islands Dependencies Survey (FIDS) (1958–59). The name derives from association with Rambler Harbor which lies on the north side of the island.

== See also ==
- List of Antarctic and sub-Antarctic islands
