= Levy Island =

Island in Antarctica

- Location within Antarctica Location within Antarctic Peninsula

Geography
- Location: Antarctica
- Coordinates: 66°20′S 66°35′W

Administration
- Administered under the Antarctic Treaty System

Demographics
- Population: Uninhabited

Levy Island is an isolated snow-covered island in Crystal Sound, Antarctica, about 14 km (7.5 nmi) east of Gagge Point, Lavoisier Island. It was mapped from air photos taken by the Ronne Antarctic Research Expedition (1947–48) and surveys by the Falkland Islands Dependencies Survey (1958–59). The island was named by the UK Antarctic Place-Names Committee for Henri A. Levy, an American physical chemist who, with S.W. Peterson, determined the location of the hydrogen atoms in ice by neutron diffraction, in 1957.

== See also ==
- List of Antarctic and sub-Antarctic islands
