= Lyle Benjamin Borst =

American nuclear physicist and inventor

- Born: 24 November 1912; Chicago, Illinois
- Died: 30 July 2002 (aged 89); Williamsville, New York
- Education: University of Illinois; University of Chicago
- Known for: Numerous inventions Nuclear Train
- Spouse: Ruth Barbara Mayer
- Children: John Benjamin Borst; Stephen Lyle Borst; Frances Elizabeth Wright
- Scientific career
- Fields: Nuclear physics
- Workplaces: Manhattan Project; Clinton Engineering Works; Oak Ridge National Laboratory; Brookhaven National Laboratory; University of Utah; New York University; State University of New York
- Thesis: The Angular Distribution of Recoil Nuclei (1941)
- Doctoral advisor: William Draper Harkins

Signature
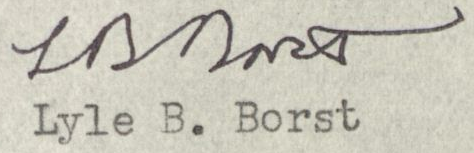

Lyle Benjamin Borst (November 24, 1912 – July 30, 2002) was an American nuclear physicist and inventor. He worked with Enrico Fermi in Chicago, was involved with the Manhattan Project, and worked with Ernest O. Wollan to conduct neutron scattering and neutron diffraction studies.

== Life and times ==
Borst was born on November 24, 1912, in Cook County at Chicago, Illinois, the son of George William Borst aged 39 of Chicago, Illinois, and Jennie Beveridge aged 26. Borst was married to Ruth Barbara Mayer Borst for 63 years and had 3 children, sons, John Benjamin and Stephen Lyle and daughter, Frances Elizabeth Wright including 7 grandchildren and 4 great-grandchildren. He died at his home in Williamsville, New York on July 30, 2002.

== Career ==
Borst attended the University of Illinois at Urbana–Champaign and received bachelor's and master's degrees. He attended the University of Chicago and was awarded a doctorate degree in chemistry in 1941. Borst worked as a senior physicist on the Manhattan Project from 1943 to 1946 at the Clinton Laboratories in Oak Ridge, Tennessee. In 1944 Ernest O. Wollan and Borst used neutron diffraction to produce "rocking curves" for crystals of gypsum and sodium chloride (salt). In 1946 Karl Z. Morgan and Borst at Oak Ridge develop a film badge to measure worker exposure to fast neutrons. From 1946 to 1951 Borst was chairman of the department of reactor science and engineering at Brookhaven National Laboratory and was responsible for the operation and oversight of the Brookhaven Graphite Research Reactor. He played a key role in the design of the research reactor. Borst was at the University of Utah from 1951 to 1953 as professor of physics. From 1956 to 1961 he was chairman of the department of physics at the college of engineering at New York University. From 1961 to 1983 Borst was professor of physics at State University of New York in Buffalo, New York, and was appointed professor emeritus in 1983. In 1969 he served as master of Clifford Furnas College at the State University of New York at Buffalo.

== Professional service ==
- National Board of the American Civil Liberties Union, member
- ACLU, Niagara Frontier Chapter, chairman
- American Physical Society, Fellow
- American Association for the Advancement of Science, member
- Association of Oak Ridge Scientists, founding member
- Federation of Atomic Scientists, founder

== Publications ==
=== Thesis and dissertation ===
- The Angular Distribution of Recoil Nuclei. 1941

== Patents ==
- Adjustable support for spectrometer reflectors. 18 December 1951.
- Method of testing hermetic containers. 17 February 1959.
- Central control system. 22 September 1959.
- Neutronic reactor shielding. 11 July 1961.
- Convergent Neutronic Reactor. 5 June 1962.
- Neutron amplifier. 2 October 1962.
- Process for cooling a nuclear reactor. 11 December 1962.
- Improvements in neutron reactors. 1962.
- Temperature measuring method and apparatus. 30 July 1963.
- Nuclear reactor for a railway vehicle. 31 March 1964.
- Neutron reactors. 20 July 1965.
- Nuclear power reactor. 27 July 1965.
- Process for controlling thermal neutron concentration in an irradiated system. 18 October 1966.
- Neutron amplifier. 13 December 1966.
- Photographic process. 29 June 1976.
