= Ruth Fowler Edwards =

British geneticist (1930–2013)

- Born: Ruth Fowler; December 1930
- Died: October 2013 (aged 82)
- Education: University of Edinburgh
- Occupation: geneticist
- Known for: Genetics research
- Spouse: Robert Edwards
- Children: 5
- Parents: Sir Ralph Fowler (father); Eileen Mary Rutherford (mother)
- Relatives: Ernest Rutherford (grandfather)

Ruth Fowler Edwards, Lady Edwards (14 December 1930 – 3 October 2013) was a British geneticist and the long-time wife and collaborator of Robert G. (Bob) Edwards, the "father" of in vitro fertilization.

== Life ==
Ruth was descended from a line of distinguished scientists. According to Martin Johnson,

She was the granddaughter of Ernest Rutherford, who himself won the Nobel Prize for chemistry in 1908, ‘for his investigations into the disintegration of the elements, and the chemistry of radioactive substances’ (Eve and Chadwick, 1938). Her father was Sir Ralph Fowler FRS (1889–1944; Milne, 1945), who was Plummer Professor of Mathematical Physics in Cambridge from 1932 to 1944.

Her mother, Eileen Mary Rutherford, was the only daughter of physicist Ernest Rutherford and they had four children, with Ruth as the youngest. Her mother died of a blood clot a week after Ruth's birth.

=== University years ===
Having developed an interest in biological sciences, Ruth Fowler studied genetics in the early 1950s at the University of Edinburgh and while there, she met physiologist Robert Edwards in a statistics class in 1952 while she was working on her Ph.D. in genetics, after completing a biology degree there. Edwards was also doing work on his Ph.D. but was having problems so the two students teamed up, solved the problem and both completed their doctorates. After graduation, they left for California for post-doctoral assignments. They studied there a year before returning to the U.K.

=== Career ===
Fowler and Edwards worked together on controlled ovulation induction in the mouse. In their first joint paper, published in 1957, they showed that superovulation of adults was possible. Fowler later worked on the effects of progesterone and oestrogen on pregnancy and embryonic mortality in the mouse; the differences in ovarian output between natural conditions and superovulation; growth and genetics of the early human embryo developing in culture; uterine fluid composition and embryo implantation in the rabbit; steroidogenesis in human granulosa cells and follicular growth; glycoprotein composition and cell-to-cell interactions in the cumulus-oocyte complex. Fowler continued to work and publish into the 1980s.

An obituary was published by Simon Fishel, Edwards' student, in RBM Online, a journal created by Edwards with the support of Fowler. In 2014, Fishel described her contributions in her obituary:

She was a remarkable woman who had that rare capacity to juggle three, indeed four, of the most difficult and all too often competing roles in our complex lives: successful mother, wife and scientist whose highly significant work spanned more than three decades. And for that “elite fourth” role, provided sustenance at both the intellectual and family level to a great, Nobel Laureate husband!” It was fitting therefore that when Edwards was too ill to receive the Nobel Prize in person, these words were spoken, “In the absence of this year's Nobel Laureate in Physiology or Medicine, I ask Professor Edwards' wife and long-term scientific companion, Dr. Ruth Fowler Edwards, to come forward and receive his Prize from the hands of His Majesty the King.

== Marriage and children ==
Robert Edwards and Ruth Fowler married in 1956. They had five daughters.

== Selected publications ==
Dr. Ruth Fowler Edwards often published her work using her maiden name R.E. Fowler.

- FOWLER, R. E., & Edwards, R. G. (1957). Induction of superovulation and pregnancy in mature mice by gonadotrophins. Journal of Endocrinology, 15(4), 374–384.
- Fowler, R. E. (1958). The growth and carcass composition of strains of mice selected for large and small body size. The Journal of Agricultural Science, 51(2), 137–148.
- Fowler, R. E., & Edwards, R. G. (1960). The fertility of mice selected for large or small body size. Genetics Research, 1(3), 393–407.
- Fowler, R. E., & Edwards, R. G. (1960). Effect of progesterone and oestrogen on pregnancy and embryonic mortality in adult mice following superovulation treatment. Journal of Endocrinology, 20, 1–8.
- Edwards, R. G., Fowler, R. E., Gore-Langton, R. E., Gosden, R. G., Jones, E. C., Readhead, C., & Steptoe, P. C. (1977). Normal and abnormal follicular growth in mouse, rat and human ovaries. Reproduction, 51(1), 237–263.
- Fowler, R. E., Edwards, R. G., Walters, D. E., Chan, S. T. H., & Steptoe, P. C. (1978). Steroidogenesis in preovulatory follicles of patients given human menopausal and chorionic gonadotrophins as judged by the radioimmunoassay of steroids in follicular fluid. Journal of Endocrinology, 77(2), 161–169.
- Edwards, R. G., & Fowler, R. E. (1970). Human embryos in the laboratory. Scientific American, 223(6), 44–57.
- Fowler, R. E., Fox, N. L., Edwards, R. G., & Steptoe, P. C. (1978). Steroid production from 17α-hydoxypregnenolone and dehydroepiandrosterone by human granulosa cells in vitro. Reproduction, 54(1), 109–117.
