= Bjerrum =

Bjerrum may refer to:

People

- Niels Janniksen Bjerrum (1879–1958), Danish chemist (son of Jannik Petersen Bjerrum and father of Jannik Bjerrum)
- Jannik Bjerrum (1909–1992), Danish chemist (son of Niels Janniksen Bjerrum)
- Jannik Petersen Bjerrum (1851–1920), Danish ophthalmologist (father of Niels Janniksen Bjerrum)
- Kirstine Bjerrum Meyer (1861–1941), Danish physicist (sister of Jannik Petersen Bjerrum)

Other uses

- Bjerrum plot
- Bjerrum defect
