= Bernal Islands =

- Location within Antarctica Location within Antarctic Peninsula

Geography
- Location: Antarctica
- Coordinates: 66°22′S 66°28′W

Administration
- Administered under the Antarctic Treaty System

Demographics
- Population: Uninhabited

The Bernal Islands are a group of four mainly snow-covered islands and a number of rocks lying in Crystal Sound, about 19 km (10 nmi) east of the south end of Lavoisier Island, Biscoe Islands. They were mapped from surveys by the Falkland Islands Dependencies Survey (1958–59) and from air photos obtained by the Ronne Antarctic Research Expedition (1947–48), and named by the UK Antarctic Place-Names Committee for John D. Bernal, a British physicist, joint author with Sir Ralph Fowler of a classic 1933 paper on the structure of ice which suggested the location of the hydrogen atoms, known as the ice rules.

== See also ==
- List of Antarctic and sub-Antarctic islands
