= Davidson Island =

Island in Graham Land, Antarctica

Davidson Island (66°26′S 66°37′W) is a small, dome-shaped ice-covered island between Wollan Island and Shull Rocks in Crystal Sound. It was mapped from air photos obtained by the Ronne Antarctic Research Expedition (1947–48) and the Falkland Islands and Dependencies Aerial Survey Expedition (1958–59) and from surveys by the Falkland Islands Dependencies Survey (1958–59). It was named by the UK Antarctic Place-Names Committee for William L. Davidson, an American physicist who used neutron diffraction to determine the position of the hydrogen atoms in ice.

== See also ==
- List of Antarctic and sub-Antarctic islands
