= Neutron diffraction =

Technique to investigate atomic structures using neutron scattering

Neutron diffraction or elastic neutron scattering is the application of neutron scattering to the determination of the atomic and/or magnetic structure of a material. A sample to be examined is placed in a beam of thermal or cold neutrons to obtain a diffraction pattern that provides information of the structure of the material. The technique is similar to X-ray diffraction but, due to their different scattering properties, neutrons and X-rays provide complementary information: X-Rays are suited for superficial analysis, strong x-rays from synchrotron radiation are suited for shallow depths or thin specimens, while neutrons having high penetration depth are suited for bulk samples.

== History ==
=== Discovery of the neutron ===
In 1921, American chemist and physicist William D. Harkins introduced the term "neutron" while studying atomic structure and nuclear reactions. He proposed the existence of a neutral particle within the atomic nucleus, though there was no experimental evidence for it at the time. In 1932, British physicist James Chadwick provided experimental proof of the neutron's existence. His discovery confirmed the presence of this neutral subatomic particle, earning him the Nobel Prize in Physics in 1935. Chadwick's research was influenced by earlier work from Irène and Frédéric Joliot-Curie, who had detected unexplained neutral radiation but had not recognized it as a distinct particle. Neutrons are subatomic particles that exist in the nucleus of the atom, they have higher mass than protons but zero [net] electrical charge.

In the 1930s Enrico Fermi and colleagues gave theoretical contributions establishing the foundation of neutron scattering. Fermi developed a framework to understand how neutrons interact with atomic nuclei.

=== Early diffraction work ===
Diffraction was first observed in 1936 by two groups, von Halban and Preiswerk and Mitchell and Powers. In 1944, Ernest O. Wollan, with a background in X-ray scattering from his PhD work under Arthur Compton, recognized the potential for applying thermal neutrons from the newly operational X-10 nuclear reactor to crystallography. Joined by Clifford G. Shull they developed neutron diffraction throughout the 1940s.

Neutron diffraction experiments were carried out in 1945 by Ernest O. Wollan using the Graphite Reactor at Oak Ridge. He was joined shortly thereafter (June 1946) by Clifford Shull, and together they established the basic principles of the technique, and applied it successfully to many different materials, addressing problems like the structure of ice and the microscopic arrangements of magnetic moments in materials. For this achievement, Shull was awarded one half of the 1994 Nobel Prize in Physics. (Wollan died in 1984). (The other half of the 1994 Nobel Prize for Physics went to Bert Brockhouse for development of the inelastic scattering technique at the Chalk River facility of AECL. This also involved the invention of the triple axis spectrometer).

=== 1950–60s ===
The development of neutron sources such as nuclear reactors and spallation sources emerged. This allowed high-intensity neutron beams, enabling advanced scattering experiments. Notably, the High Flux Isotope Reactor (HFIR) at Oak Ridge and Institut Laue–Langevin (ILL) in Grenoble, France emerged as key institutions for neutron scattering studies.

=== 1970–1980s ===
This period saw major advancements in neutron scattering techniques by developing techniques to explore different aspects of material science: structure and behaviour.

Small-angle neutron scattering (SANS): Used to investigate large-scale structural features in materials. The works of Glatter and Kratky also helped in the advancements of this method, though it was primarily developed for X-rays.

Inelastic neutron scattering (INS): Provides insights into the dynamic process at the microscopic level. Majorly used to examine atomic and molecular motions.

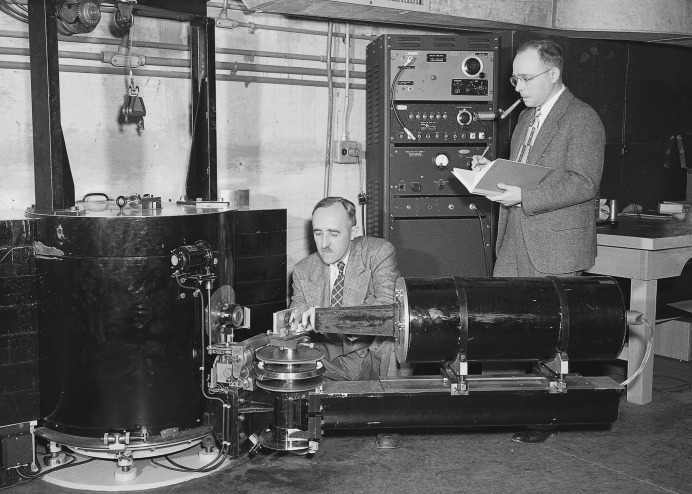
In 1949, Ernest Wollan and Clifford Shull conducted experiments using a double-crystal neutron spectrometer positioned on the southern side of the ORNL graphite reactor to collect data.

=== 1990-present ===
Recent advancements focus on improved sources, using sophisticated detectors and enhanced computational techniques. Spallation sources have been developed at Spallation Neutron Source (SNS) in the U.S. and ISIS Neutron and Muon Source in the U.K., which can generate pulsed neutron beams for time-of-flight experiments. Neutron imaging and neutron reflectometry were also developed, which are powerful tools to analyse surfaces, interfaces, and thin film structures, thus providing valuable insights into the material properties.

== Comparison of neutron scattering, XRD, and electron scattering ==
Feature	Neutron diffraction	X-ray diffraction	Electron scattering
Principle	Interacts with atomic nuclei and magnetic moments enabling nuclear and magnetic scattering	Scatters off electron cloud thus allowing probing of electron density.	Scatters off electrostatic potential thus allowing probing of electron density.
Penetration depth	High (suitable to study bulk materials since neutrons penetrate deeply in)	Moderate (good penetration but also absorption by heavy elements)	Low (suitable for surface studies since electrons are strongly absorbed) or quite deep, depending upon the energy.
Sensitivity to light elements	High (very sensitive to lighter elements like hydrogen or lithium)	Low (poor sensitivity to lighter elements)	High (can detect lighter elements).
Magnetic studies	Excellent (can probe magnetic structure and spin dynamics)	Limited (require specialized techniques like resonance magnetic scattering)	Yields local information
Resolution	High (depending on techniques and instrument)	High (can yield very precise positions for crystal structure)	Very high (can achieve high resolution)
Sample environment	Efficient (used to study samples in different environment)	Efficient	Limited (requires vacuum and thin samples)
Applications	Structure of materials and magnetic property of the material.	Structure of materials, see x-ray diffraction	Used for bulk materials, surfaces, defects, see electron diffraction.

== Principle ==
=== Processes ===
Neutrons are produced through three major processes: fission, spallation, and low-energy nuclear reactions.

==== Fission ====
In research reactors, fission takes place when a fissile nucleus, such as uranium-235 (^{235}U), absorbs a neutron, and subsequently splits into two smaller fragments. This process releases energy along with additional neutrons. On average, each fission event produces about 2.5 neutrons. While one neutron is required to maintain the chain reaction, the surplus neutrons can be utilized for various experimental applications.

==== Spallation ====
In spallation sources, high-energy protons (on the order of 1 GeV) bombard a heavy metal target (e.g., uranium (U), tungsten (W), tantalum (Ta), lead (Pb), or mercury (Hg)). This interaction causes the nuclei to spit out neutrons. Proton interactions result in around ten to thirty neutrons per event, of which the bulk are known as "evaporation neutrons" (~2 MeV), while a minority are known as "cascade neutrons" with energies reaching up to the GeV range. Although spallation is a very efficient technique of neutron production, the technique generates high-energy particles, therefore requiring shielding for safety.

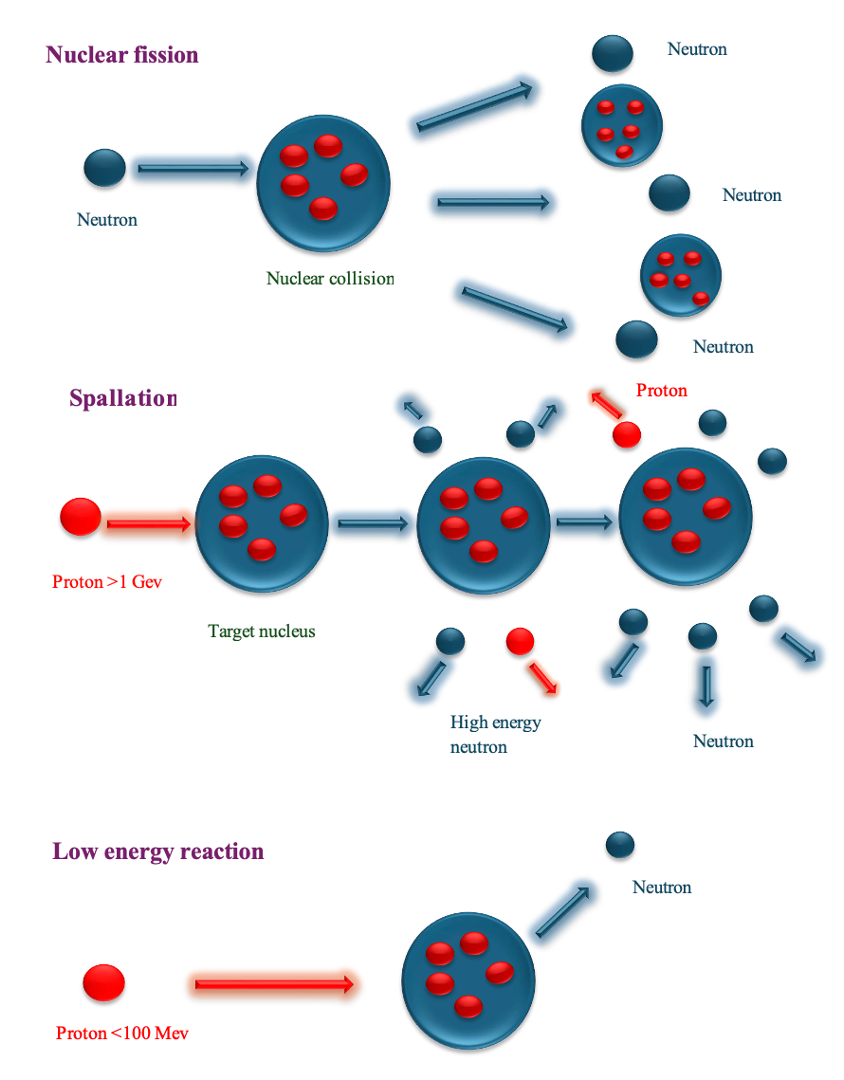
Three major fundamental processes generating neutrons for scattering experiments: nuclear fission (top), spallation (middle), low-energy reaction (bottom)

==== Low-energy nuclear reactions ====
Low-energy nuclear reactions are the basis of neutron production in accelerator-driven sources. The selected target materials are based on the energy levels; lighter metals such as lithium (Li) and beryllium (Be) can be used to achieve their maximum possible reaction rate under 30 MeV, while heavier elements such as tungsten (W) and carbon (C) provide better performance above 312 MeV. These Compact Accelerator-driven Neutron Sources (CANS) have matured and are now approaching the performance of fission and spallation sources.

=== De-Broglie relation ===
Neutron scattering relies on the wave-particle dual nature of neutrons. The De-Broglie relation links the wavelength (λ) of a neutron to its energy (E)
$$\lambda=h/p=h/mv$$
where h is the Planck constant, p is the momentum of the neutron, m is the mass of the neutron, v is the velocity of the neutron.

== Scattering ==
Neutron scattering is used to detect the distance between atoms and study the dynamics of materials. It involves two major principles: elastic scattering and inelastic scattering.

Elastic scattering provides insight into the structural properties of materials by looking at the angles at which neutrons are scattered. The resulting pattern of the scattering provides information regarding the atomic structure of crystals, liquids, and amorphous materials.

Inelastic scattering focuses on material dynamics through the study of neutron energy and momentum changes during interactions. It is key to study phonons, magnons, and other excitations of solid materials.

== Neutron–matter interaction ==
X- rays interact with matter through electrostatic interaction by interacting with the electron cloud of atoms, this limits their application as they can be scattered strongly from electrons. While being neutral, neutrons primarily interact with matter through the short-range strong force with atomic nuclei. Nuclei are far smaller than the electron cloud, meaning most materials are transparent to neutrons and allow deeper penetration. The interaction between neutrons and nuclei is described by the Fermi pseudopotential, that is, neutrons are well above their meson mass threshold, and thus can be treated effectively as point-like scatterers. While most elements have a low tendency to absorb neutrons, certain ones such as cadmium (Cd), gadolinium (Gd), helium (^{3}He), lithium (^{6}Li), and boron (^{10}B) exhibit strong neutron absorption due to nuclear resonance effects. The likelihood of absorption increases with neutron wavelength (σ_{a} ∝ λ), meaning slower neutrons are absorbed more readily than faster ones.

== Instrumental and sample requirements ==
The technique requires a source of neutrons. Neutrons are usually produced in a nuclear reactor or spallation source. At a research reactor, other components are needed, including a crystal monochromator (in the case of thermal neutrons), as well as filters to select the desired neutron wavelength. Some parts of the setup may also be movable. For the long-wavelength neutrons, crystals cannot be used, and gratings are used instead as diffractive optical components. At a spallation source, the time of flight technique is used to sort the energies of the incident neutrons (higher energy neutrons are faster), so no monochromator is needed, but rather a series of aperture elements synchronized to filter neutron pulses with the desired wavelength.

The technique is most commonly performed as powder diffraction, which only requires a polycrystalline powder. Single-crystal diffraction is also possible, but the crystals must be much larger than those that are used in single-crystal X-ray crystallography. It is common to use crystals that are about 1 mm^{3}.

The technique also requires a device that can detect the neutrons after they have been scattered.

Summarizing, the main disadvantage to neutron diffraction is the requirement for a nuclear reactor. For single-crystal work, the technique requires relatively large crystals, which are usually challenging to grow. The advantages to the technique are many - sensitivity to light atoms, ability to distinguish isotopes, absence of radiation damage, and a penetration depth of several cm.

== Nuclear scattering ==
Like all quantum particles, neutrons can exhibit wave phenomena typically associated with light or sound. Diffraction is one of these phenomena; it occurs when waves encounter obstacles whose size is comparable with the wavelength. If the wavelength of a quantum particle is short enough, atoms or their nuclei can serve as diffraction obstacles. When a beam of neutrons emanating from a reactor is slowed and selected properly by their speed, their wavelength lies near one angstrom (0.1 nm), the typical separation between atoms in a solid material. Such a beam can then be used to perform a diffraction experiment. Impinging on a crystalline sample, it will scatter under a limited number of well-defined angles, according to the same Bragg law that describes X-ray diffraction.

Neutrons and X-rays interact with matter differently. X-rays interact primarily with the electron cloud surrounding each atom. The contribution to the diffracted x-ray intensity is therefore larger for atoms with larger atomic number (Z). On the other hand, neutrons interact directly with the nucleus of the atom, and the contribution to the diffracted intensity depends on each isotope; for example, regular hydrogen and deuterium contribute differently. It is also often the case that light (low-Z) atoms contribute strongly to the diffracted intensity, even in the presence of large-Z atoms. The scattering length varies from isotope to isotope rather than linearly with the atomic number. An element like vanadium strongly scatters X-rays, but its nuclei hardly scatters neutrons, which is why it is often used as a container material. Non-magnetic neutron diffraction is directly sensitive to the positions of the nuclei of the atoms.

The nuclei of atoms, from which neutrons scatter, are tiny. Furthermore, there is no need for an atomic form factor to describe the shape of the electron cloud of the atom and the scattering power of an atom does not fall off with the scattering angle as it does for X-rays. Diffractograms therefore can show strong, well-defined diffraction peaks even at high angles, particularly if the experiment is done at low temperatures. Many neutron sources are equipped with liquid helium cooling systems that allow data collection at temperatures down to 4.2 K. The superb high-angle (i.e. high resolution) information means that the atomic positions in the structure can be determined with high precision. On the other hand, Fourier maps (and to a lesser extent difference Fourier maps) derived from neutron data suffer from series termination errors, sometimes so much that the results are meaningless.

== Magnetic scattering ==
Although neutrons are uncharged, they carry a magnetic moment, and therefore interact with magnetic moments, including those arising from the electron cloud around an atom. Neutron diffraction can therefore reveal the microscopic magnetic structure of a material.

Magnetic scattering does require an atomic form factor, as it is caused by the much larger electron cloud around the tiny nucleus. The intensity of the magnetic contribution to the diffraction peaks will therefore decrease toward higher angles.

== Uses ==
Neutron diffraction can be used to determine the static structure factor of gases, liquids, or amorphous solids. Most experiments, however, aim at the structure of crystalline solids, making neutron diffraction an important tool of crystallography.

Neutron diffraction is closely related to X-ray powder diffraction. In fact, the single-crystal version of the technique is less commonly used because currently available neutron sources require relatively large samples and large single crystals are hard or impossible to come by for most materials. Future developments, however, may well change this picture. Because the data is typically a 1D powder diffractogram they are usually processed using Rietveld refinement. In fact the latter found its origin in neutron diffraction (at Petten in the Netherlands) and was later extended for use in X-ray diffraction.

One practical application of elastic neutron scattering/diffraction is that the lattice constant of metals and other crystalline materials can be very accurately measured. Together with an accurately aligned micropositioner a map of the lattice constant through the metal can be derived. This can easily be converted to the stress field experienced by the material. This has been used to analyse stresses in aerospace and automotive components to give just two examples. The high penetration depth permits measuring residual stresses in bulk components such as crankshafts, pistons, rails, and gears. This technique has led to the development of dedicated stress diffractometers, such as the ENGIN-X instrument at the ISIS neutron source.

Neutron diffraction can also be employed to give insight into the 3D structure any material that diffracts.

Another use is for the determination of the solvation number of ion pairs in electrolytes solutions.

The magnetic scattering effect has been used since the establishment of the neutron diffraction technique to quantify magnetic moments in materials, and study the magnetic dipole orientation and structure. One of the earliest applications of neutron diffraction was in the study of magnetic dipole orientations in antiferromagnetic transition metal oxides such as manganese, iron, nickel, and cobalt oxides. These experiments, first performed by Clifford Shull, were the first to show the existence of the antiferromagnetic arrangement of magnetic dipoles in a material structure. Neutron diffraction continues to be used to characterize newly developed magnetic materials.

=== Hydrogen, null-scattering, and contrast variation ===
Neutron diffraction can be used to establish the structure of low atomic number materials like proteins and surfactants much more easily with lower flux than at a synchrotron radiation source. This is because some low atomic number materials have a higher cross section for neutron interaction than higher atomic weight materials.

One major advantage of neutron diffraction over X-ray diffraction is that the latter is rather insensitive to the presence of hydrogen (H) in a structure, whereas the nuclei ^{1}H and ^{2}H (i.e. deuterium, D) are strong scatterers for neutrons. The greater scattering power of protons and deuterons means that the position of hydrogen in a crystal and its thermal motions can be determined with greater precision by neutron diffraction. The structures of metal hydride complexes, e.g., Mg_{2}FeH_{6} have been assessed by neutron diffraction.

The neutron scattering lengths b_{H} = −3.7406(11) fm and b_{D} = 6.671(4) fm, for H and D respectively, have opposite sign, which allows the technique to distinguish them. In fact there is a particular isotope ratio for which the contribution of the element would cancel, this is called null-scattering.

It is undesirable to work with the relatively high concentration of H in a sample. The scattering intensity by H-nuclei has a large inelastic component, which creates a large continuous background that is more or less independent of scattering angle. The elastic pattern typically consists of sharp Bragg reflections if the sample is crystalline. They tend to drown in the inelastic background. This is even more serious when the technique is used for the study of liquid structure. Nevertheless, by preparing samples with different isotope ratios, it is possible to vary the scattering contrast enough to highlight one element in an otherwise complicated structure. The variation of other elements is possible but usually rather expensive. Hydrogen is inexpensive and particularly interesting, because it plays an exceptionally large role in biochemical structures and is difficult to study structurally in other ways.

== Applications ==
=== Study of hydrogen storage materials ===
Since neutron diffraction is particularly sensitive to lighter elements like hydrogen, it can be used for its detection. It can play a role in determining the crystal structure and hydrogen binding sites within metal hydrides, a class of materials of interest for hydrogen storage applications. The order of hydrogen atoms in the lattice reflects the storage capacity and kinetics of the material.

=== Magnetic structure determination ===
Neutron diffraction is also a useful technique for determining magnetic structures in materials, as neutrons can interact with magnetic moments. It can be used to determine the antiferromagnetic structure of manganese oxide (MnO) using neutron diffraction. Neutron Diffraction Studies can be used to measure the magnetic moment. Orientation study demonstrates how neutron diffraction can detect the precise alignment of the magnetic moment in materials, something that is much more challenging with X-rays.

=== Phase transition in ferroelectrics ===
Neutron diffraction has been widely employed to understand phase transitions in materials including ferroelectrics, which show the transition of crystal structure with temperature or pressure. It can be utilised to study the ferroelectric phase transition in lead titanate (PbTiO_{3}). It can be used to analyse atomic displacements and corresponding lattice distortions.

=== Residual stress analysis in engineering materials ===
Neutron diffraction can be used as a technique for the nondestructive assessment of residual stresses in engineering materials, including metals and alloys. Also used for measuring residual stresses in engineering materials.

=== Lithium-ion batteries ===
Neutron diffraction is especially useful for the investigation of lithium-ion battery materials, because lithium atoms are almost opaque to X-ray radiation. It can further be used to investigate the structural evolution of lithium-ion battery cathode materials during charge and discharge cycles.

=== High-temperature superconductors ===
Neutron diffraction has played an important role in revealing the crystal and magnetic structures in high-temperature superconductors. A neutron diffraction study of magnetic order in the high-temperature superconductor YBa_{2}Cu_{3}O_{6}+x was done. The work of each of these scientific teams together with others across the globe has revealed the origins of the relationship between magnetic ordering and superconductivity, delivering crucial insights into the mechanism of high-temperature superconductivity.

=== Mechanical behaviour of alloys ===
Advancements in neutron diffraction have facilitated in situ investigations into the mechanical deformation of alloys under load, permitting observations on the mechanisms of deformation. The deformation behavior of titanium alloys under mechanical loads can be investigated using in situ neutron diffraction. This technique allows real-time monitoring of lattice strains and phase transformations throughout deformation.

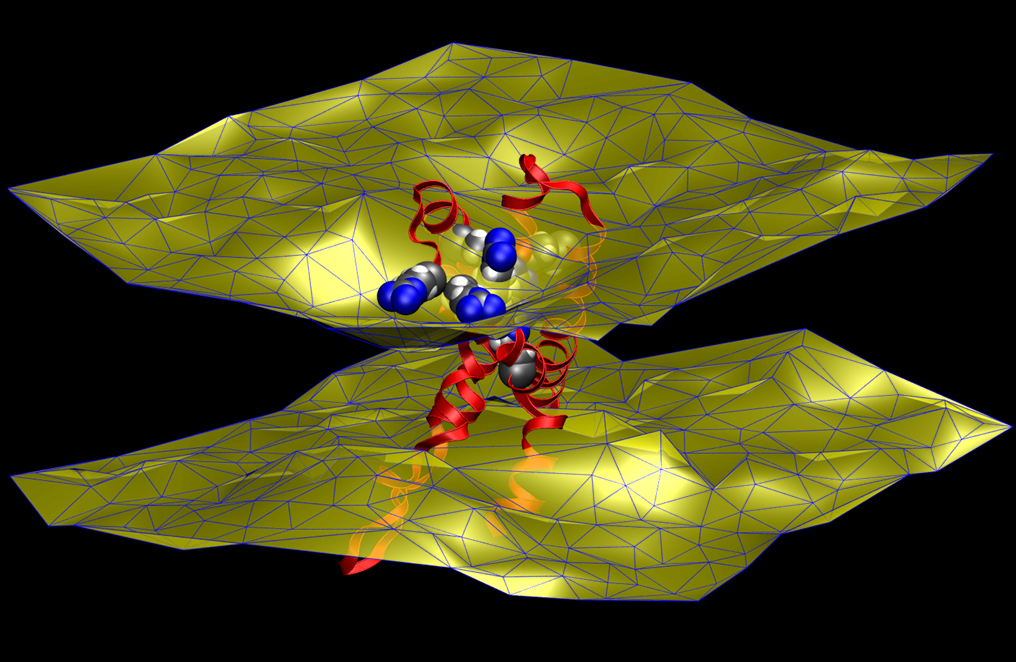
Neutron diffraction, used along with molecular simulations, revealed that an ion channel's voltage sensing domain (red, yellow, and blue molecule at center) perturbs the two-layered cell membrane that surrounds it (yellow surfaces), causing the membrane to thin slightly.

=== Neutron diffraction for ion channels ===
Neutron diffraction can be used to study ion channels, highlighting how neutrons interact with biological structures to reveal atomic details. Neutron diffraction is particularly sensitive to light elements like hydrogen, making it ideal for mapping water molecules, ion positions, and hydrogen bonds within the channel. By analysing neutron scattering patterns, researchers can determine ion binding sites, hydration structures, and conformational changes essential for ion transport and selectivity.

== Current developments in neutron diffraction ==
=== Advancements in neutron diffraction research ===
Neutron diffraction has made significant progress, particularly at Oak Ridge National Laboratory (ORNL), which operates a suite of 12 diffractometers—seven at the Spallation Neutron Source (SNS) and five at the High Flux Isotope Reactor (HFIR). These instruments are designed for different applications and are grouped into three categories: powder diffraction, single-crystal diffraction, and advanced diffraction techniques.

To further enhance neutron diffraction research, ORNL is undertaking several key projects:

- Expansion of the SNS First Target Station: New beamlines equipped with state-of-the-art instruments are being installed to broaden the scope of scientific investigations.
- Proton Power Upgrade: This initiative aims to double the proton power used for neutron production, which will enhance research efficiency, allow for the study of smaller and more complex samples, and support the eventual development of a next-generation neutron source at SNS.
- Development of the SNS Second Target Station: A new facility is being constructed to house 22 beamlines, making it a leading source for cold neutron research, crucial for studying soft matter, biological systems, and quantum materials.
- Enhancements at HFIR: Planned upgrades include optimizing the cold neutron guide hall to improve experimental capabilities, expanding isotope production (including plutonium-238 for space exploration), and enhancing the performance of existing instruments.

These advancements are set to significantly improve neutron diffraction techniques, allowing for more precise and detailed analysis of material structures. By expanding research capabilities and increasing neutron production efficiency, these developments will support a wide range of scientific fields, from materials science to energy research and quantum physics.

=== Modern trends in neutron scattering information technology ===
Neutron diffraction technology is evolving rapidly, with a focus on improving beam intensity and instrument efficiency. Modern instruments are designed to produce smaller, more intense beams, enabling high-precision studies of smaller samples, which is particularly beneficial for new material research. Advanced detectors, such as boron-based alternatives to helium-3, are being developed to address material shortages, while improved neutron spin manipulation enhances the study of magnetic and structural properties. Computational advancements, including simulations and virtual instruments, are optimizing neutron sources, streamlining experimental design, and integrating machine learning for data analysis. Multiplexing and event-based acquisition systems are enhancing data collection by capturing multiple datasets simultaneously. Additionally, next-generation spallation sources like the European Spallation Source (ESS) and Oak Ridge's Second Target Station (STS) are increasing neutron production efficiency. Lastly, the rise of remote-controlled experiments and automation is improving accessibility and precision in neutron diffraction research.

=== Current trends in structural biology ===
Modern advancements in neutron diffraction are enhancing data precision, broadening structural research applications, and refining experimental methodologies. A key focus is the improved visualization of hydrogen atoms in biological macromolecules, crucial for studying enzymatic activity and hydrogen bonding. The expansion of specialized diffractometers has increased accessibility in structural biology, with techniques like monochromatic, quasi-Laue, and time-of-flight methods being optimized for efficiency. Innovations in sample preparation, particularly protein deuteration, are minimizing background noise and reducing the need for large crystals. Additionally, computational tools, including quantum chemical modeling, are aiding in the interpretation of complex molecular interactions. Improved neutron sources, such as spallation facilities, along with advanced detectors, are further boosting measurement accuracy and structural resolution. These developments are solidifying neutron diffraction as a critical technique for exploring the molecular architecture of biological systems.

== See also ==
- Crystallographic database
- Crystallography
- Electron diffraction
- Grazing incidence diffraction
- Inelastic neutron scattering
- X-ray diffraction computed tomography
- Characterization (materials science)
- Materials science
- Neutron transport
