= Wollan Island =

Island in Graham Land, Antarctica

Wollan Island (66°25′S 66°38′W) is a dome-shaped, ice-capped island with conspicuous rock exposures on its northwest side, lying 1 nautical mile (1.9 km) north of Davidson Island in Crystal Sound. Mapped from surveys by Falkland Islands Dependencies Survey (FIDS) (1958–59). Named by United Kingdom Antarctic Place-Names Committee (UK-APC) for Ernest O. Wollan, American physicist who used neutron diffraction to study the structure of ice.

== See also ==
- List of Antarctic and sub-Antarctic islands
