= Stefan Ice Piedmont =

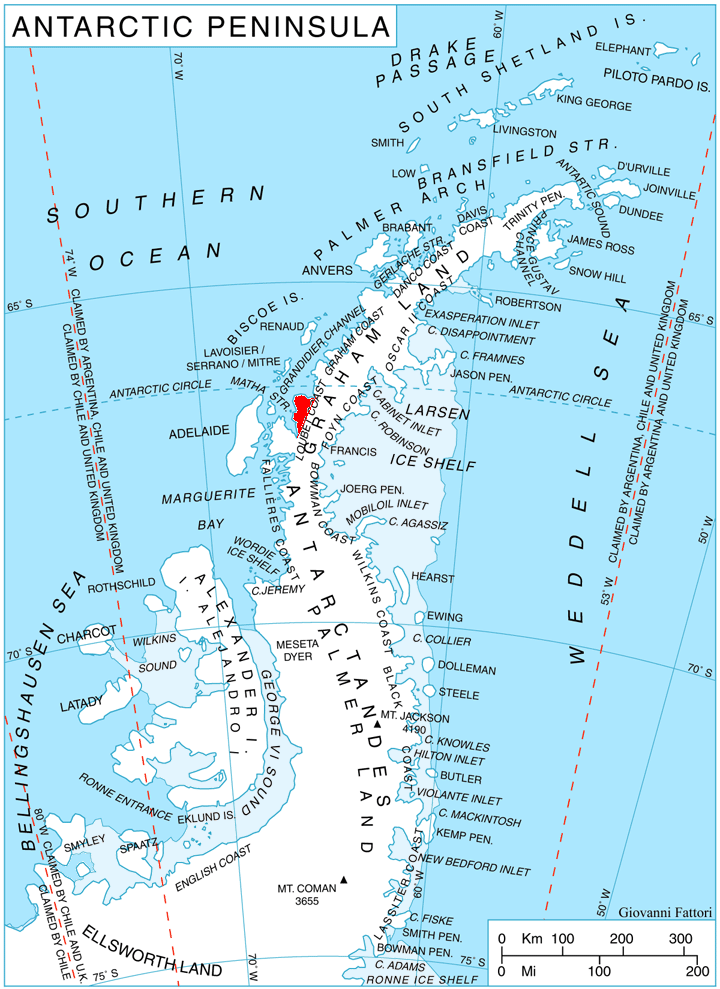
Location of Pernik Peninsula on Loubet Coast, Antarctic Peninsula.

Stefan Ice Piedmont (66°40′S 66°30′W) is a small ice piedmont at the northwest extremity of Pernik Peninsula, Loubet Coast in Graham Land, overlying the coast between Cape Rey and Holdfast Point. Mapped from air photos taken by Falkland Islands and Dependencies Aerial Survey Expedition (FIDASE) (1956–57). Named by United Kingdom Antarctic Place-Names Committee (UK-APC) for Josef Stefan (1835–1893), Slovenian physicist who in 1889 pioneered the theory of heat flow in a freezing ice layer (see Stefan problem) and first used it to calculate rates of sea ice growth in the Arctic.
