= Robert Edwards (physiologist) =

English physiologist (1925–2013)

Sir Robert Edwards CBE FRS MAE
- Born: Robert Geoffrey Edwards; 27 September 1925; Batley, England
- Died: 10 April 2013 (aged 87) near Cambridge, England
- Education: Bangor University (BSc); University of Edinburgh (PhD)
- Known for: Pioneering in-vitro fertilisation
- Spouse: Ruth Fowler (m. 1959)
- Awards: Knight Bachelor (2011); Nobel Prize (2010); Lasker Award (2001)
- Scientific career
- Fields: Physiology; Reproductive medicine
- Workplaces: University of Cambridge; University of Edinburgh; Bangor University; National Institute for Medical Research; University of Glasgow; California Institute of Technology; Churchill College, Cambridge; Bourn Hall Clinic
- Thesis: The experimental induction of heteroploidy in the mouse (1955)
- Doctoral advisor: R. A. Beatty; C. H. Waddington
- Doctoral students: Richard Gardner (embryologist); Martin Hume Johnson; Roger Gosden; Azim Surani

Sir Robert Geoffrey Edwards (27 September 1925 – 10 April 2013) was a British physiologist and pioneer in reproductive medicine, and in-vitro fertilisation (IVF) in particular. Along with obstetrician and gynaecologist Patrick Steptoe and nurse and embryologist Jean Purdy, Edwards successfully pioneered conception through IVF, which led to the birth of Louise Brown on 25 July 1978. They founded the first IVF programme for infertile patients and trained other scientists in their techniques. Edwards was the founding editor-in-chief of Human Reproduction in 1986. In 2010, he was awarded the Nobel Prize in Physiology or Medicine "for the development of in vitro fertilization".

== Education and early career ==
Edwards was born in Batley, Yorkshire, and attended Manchester Central High School on Whitworth Street in central Manchester, after which he served in the British Army, and then completed his undergraduate studies in biology, graduating with an ordinary degree from Bangor University. He studied at the Institute of Animal Genetics and Embryology at the University of Edinburgh, where he was awarded a PhD in 1955 under the supervision of R.A. Beatty and C. H. Waddington.

== Career and research ==
After a year as a postdoctoral research fellow at the California Institute of Technology he joined the scientific staff of the National Institute for Medical Research at Mill Hill. After a further year at the University of Glasgow, in 1963 he moved to the University of Cambridge as Ford Foundation Research Fellow at the Department of Physiology, and a member of Churchill College, Cambridge. He was appointed Reader in physiology in 1969.

=== Human Fertilization ===
Circa 1960 Edwards started to study human fertilisation, and he continued his work at Cambridge, laying the groundwork for his later success. In 1968 he was able to achieve fertilisation of a human egg in the laboratory and started to collaborate with Patrick Steptoe, a gynaecological surgeon from Oldham. Edwards developed human culture media to allow the fertilisation and early embryo culture, while Steptoe used laparoscopy to recover ovocytes from patients with tubal infertility. Their attempts met significant hostility and opposition, including a refusal of the Medical Research Council to fund their research and several lawsuits. Roger Gosden was one of his first graduate students.

The birth of Louise Brown, the world's first 'test-tube baby', at 11:47 pm on 25 July 1978 at the Oldham General Hospital made medical history: in vitro fertilisation meant a new way to help infertile couples who formerly had no possibility of having a baby. Nurse Jean Purdy was the first to see Brown's embryo dividing.

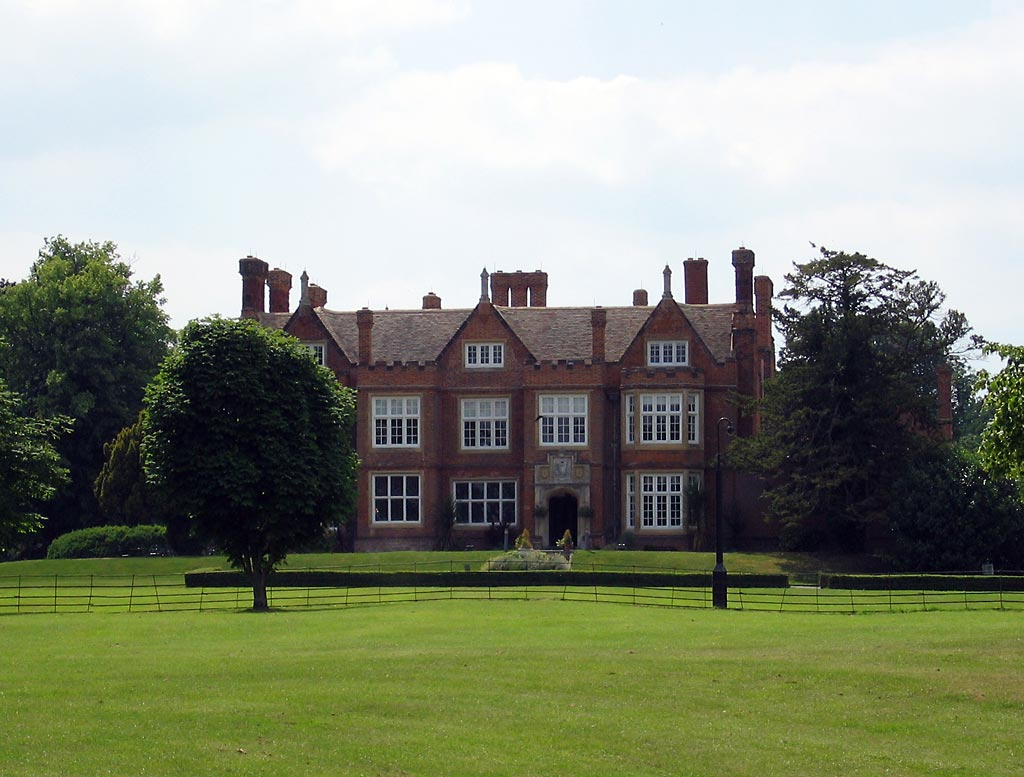
Bourn Hall Clinic

Refinements in technology have increased pregnancy rates and it is estimated that in 2010 about 4 million children have been born by IVF, with approximately 170,000 coming from donated oocytes and embryos. Their breakthrough laid the groundwork for further innovations such as intracytoplasmatic sperm injection (ICSI), embryo biopsy (PGD), and stem cell research.

Edwards, Purdy, and Steptoe founded the Bourn Hall Clinic as a place to advance their work and train new specialists. Purdy died in 1985 and Steptoe in 1988. Edwards continued in his career as a scientist and an editor of medical journals.

=== Honours and awards ===
Edwards received numerous honours and awards including:

- Edwards was elected as a Fellow of the Royal Society (FRS) in 1984.
- In 1988, Edwards was appointed Commander of the Order of the British Empire (CBE) in the 1988 New Year Honours.
- In 1994, Doctor Honoris Causa, University of Valencia (Spain).
- In 2001, he was awarded the Albert Lasker Clinical Medical Research Award by the Lasker Foundation "for the development of in vitro fertilization, a technological advance that has revolutionized the treatment of human infertility."
- In 2002, he was awarded Grand Hamdan International Award - Obstetrics & Gynecology by Hamdan Medical Award.
- In 2007, he was ranked 26th in The Daily Telegraph's list of 100 greatest living geniuses.
- In 2007, he was awarded an honorary doctorate from the University of Huddersfield.
- On 4 October 2010, it was announced that Edwards had been awarded the 2010 Nobel Prize in Physiology or Medicine for the development of in-vitro fertilisation. The Nobel Committee praised him for advancing the treatment of infertility and noted that babies of IVF have similar health statuses to other babies. Göran K. Hansson, secretary of the Nobel Assembly at the Karolinska Institutet in Stockholm, announced the news. The first child of IVF Louise Brown described the award as "fantastic news". A Vatican official condemned the move as "completely out of order". As mentioned by Simon Fishel, "In December 2010, at the Nobel awards ceremony that was full of pathos in Bob's absence, these precious words were spoken, 'In the absence of this year's Nobel Laureate in Physiology or Medicine, I ask Professor Edwards' wife and long-term scientific companion, Dr Ruth Fowler Edwards, to come forward and receive his Prize from the hands of His Majesty the King'".”
- Edwards was knighted in the 2011 Birthday Honours for services to human reproductive biology.
- Edwards featured in the BBC Radio 4 series The New Elizabethans to mark the diamond Jubilee of Queen Elizabeth II in 2012. A panel of seven academics, journalists, and historians named him among the group of people in the UK "whose actions during the reign of Elizabeth II have had a significant impact on lives in these islands and given the age its character".

== Politics ==
Edwards was a supporter of the Labour Party, and represented Newnham ward on Cambridge City Council for two terms, from 1973 to 1978. He enjoyed the experience enough to consider at one stage standing for parliament, but nothing came of it.

== Personal life ==
Edwards married Ruth Fowler Edwards (1930–2013), also a pioneer in reproductive medicine, granddaughter of 1908 Nobel laureate physicist Ernest Rutherford and daughter of physicist Ralph Fowler, in 1956. The couple had five daughters and 12 grandchildren.

=== Death ===
Edwards died at home near Cambridge, England on 10 April 2013. The Guardian said that, as of Edwards' death, more than four million births had resulted from IVF.

A plaque was unveiled at the Bourn Hall Clinic in July 2013 by Louise Brown and Alastair MacDonald – the world's first IVF baby boy – commemorating Steptoe, Edwards and Purdy.

== See also ==
- Fernando Bonilla-Musoles
