= Nakatani =

Nakatani (written: 中谷 or 仲谷) is a Japanese surname. Notable people with the surname include:

- Carlos Nakatani (1934–2004), Mexican artist
- Corey Nakatani (born 1970), American jockey
- Gen Nakatani (中谷 元, born 1957), Japanese politician
- Jin Nakatani (中谷 仁, born 1979), Japanese baseball player
- Junto Nakatani (中谷潤人, born 2 January 1998), Japanese boxer
- Masayoshi Nakatani (中谷正義, born March 8, 1989), Japanese boxer
- Michie Nakatani (中谷 美智枝, born 1961), Japanese musician
- Miki Nakatani (中谷 美紀, born 1976), Japanese actress and singer
- Nio Nakatani (仲谷鳰), Japanese manga artist
- Shinnosuke Nakatani (中谷 進之介, born 1996), Japanese footballer
- Takehide Nakatani (中谷 雄英, born 1941), Japanese judoka
- Tomoji Nakatani (中谷 智司, born 1968), Japanese politician
- Yusuke Nakatani (中谷 勇介, born 1978), Japanese footballer

== See also ==
- Nakaya, other Japanese surnames using the same kanji 中谷 or 仲谷.
