= Owston Islands =

Owston Islands (66°23′S 66°6′W) is a group of small islands lying 1 nautical mile (1.9 km) west of Darbel Islands in Crystal Sound. The Owston Islands lie within the region claimed by the United Kingdom (British Antarctic Territory), Argentina (Argentine Antarctica), and Chile (the Antártica commune in Antártica Chilena Province). They are a group of small islands lying 1 nautical mile (1.9 km) west of Darbel Islands in Crystal Sound, and they were named by the United Kingdom Antarctic Place-Names Committee. Mapped from surveys by Falkland Islands Dependencies Survey (FIDS) (1958–59). Named by United Kingdom Antarctic Place-Names Committee (UK-APC) for P. G. Owston, British crystallographer who has interpreted x-ray diffraction work on ice in terms of structure and movement of molecules.

== See also ==
- List of Antarctic and sub-Antarctic islands
