= Ernest O. Wollan =

American physicist (1902–1984)

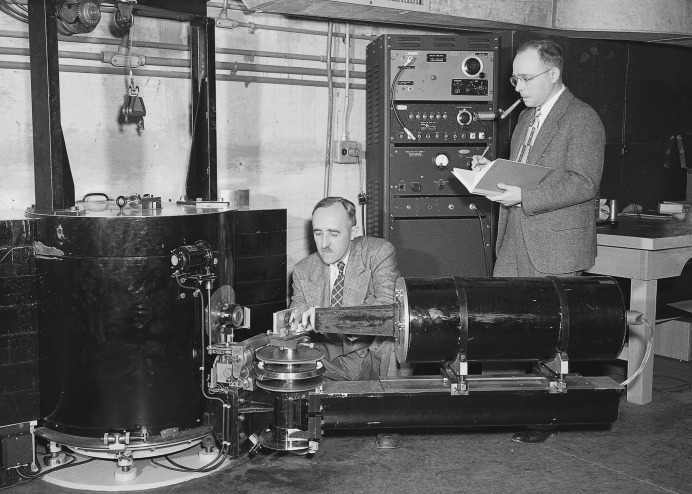
Ernest O. Wollan (left) and Clifford Shull working with a double-crystal neutron spectrometer at the ORNL X-10 graphite reactor in 1949.

Ernest Omar Wollan (November 6, 1902 – March 11, 1984) was an American physicist who made major contributions in the fields of neutron scattering and health physics.

== Biography ==
Wollan was a native of Glenwood, Minnesota. After earning a bachelor's degree at Concordia College in 1923, he undertook graduate study at the University of Chicago, where he investigated X-ray scattering under Arthur Compton and received a Ph.D. in 1929. Over the next several years, he taught physics at North Dakota State College and Washington University in St. Louis, spent a year in Zurich as a National Research Council fellow conducting research on cosmic rays, and worked with the Chicago Tumor Institute on its medical use of a radium source.

In January 1942, Wollan joined the University of Chicago Metallurgical Laboratory at the invitation of Compton and Enrico Fermi. As a member of the Manhattan Project research team, he focused on measuring radiation exposure, for which he developed the film badge dosimeter. He was one of the 50 scientists present on December 2, 1942, when the first man-made self-sustaining nuclear chain reaction was achieved in the Chicago Pile-1 experiment. He was also on the scene in Oak Ridge on November 4, 1943, when the first continuously operating reactor, the Clinton Pile, later known as the X-10 Graphite Reactor, first went critical.

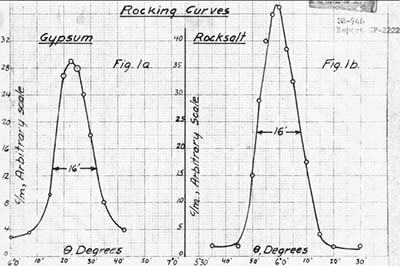
Hand-plotted rocking curves for Bragg scattering from single sodium chloride (salt) crystals at the X-10 reactor at Oak Ridge, obtained by Ernest O. Wollan and Lyle B. Borst in December 1944.

With his background in X-ray diffraction, Wollan was one of the first to recognize the potential value of neutrons for investigating the structure of materials. In May 1944 he asked the director of Clinton Laboratories (now Oak Ridge National Laboratory) for permission to use the neutron output of the X-10 reactor to study the diffraction of neutrons in single crystals. His request was granted, and a neutron crystal spectrometer that Wollan brought from Chicago was installed in the reactor that same month to make observations on a crystal of gypsum. Wollan and his group were transferred from the Metallurgical Laboratory to the Clinton Laboratories in August of that year. After some early setbacks, in December 1944 Wollan and chemist Lyle Benjamin Borst successfully used neutron diffraction to produce "rocking curves" for crystals of gypsum and sodium chloride (salt).

Working at the Oak Ridge National Laboratory (ORNL) after World War II, he continued study into neutron scattering, using the neutrons emitted from the X-10 Graphite Reactor and a modified X-ray diffractometer.

In collaboration with Clifford G. Shull, who joined him at ORNL in 1946, he developed neutron diffraction methodology used for determining atomic resolution structure of substances. In 1994, Shull was awarded a share of the Nobel Prize in Physics for his work on neutron diffraction. The unusual delay in the Nobel award, which came more than four decades after the work that it recognized, may have resulted from negative views of the work's relationship to nuclear power. Wollan was not eligible for the Nobel because he had died 10 years earlier. In his Nobel lecture Shull spoke of Wollan's contributions and expressed regret that his colleague had not lived long enough to share in the prize.

Wollan remained a member of the ORNL research staff until retiring in 1967. For much of his 23-year service at ORNL, he was associate director of the Physics Division. He continued as a consultant to ORNL until 1977. In his final years, Wollan returned to Minnesota, the state of his birth, where he died in 1984.

== Honors and awards ==
- Wollan Island, in Crystal Sound, Antarctica, is named in honor of Wollan's work on the crystal structure of ice using neutrons.
- Fellow of the American Physical Society, elected in 1936
- Concordia College awarded him an honorary Doctor of Science in 1965.
- John Price Wetherill Medal, 1967
