= Ralph Fowler =

British mathematical physicist (1889–1944)

Sir Ralph Fowler OBE FRS
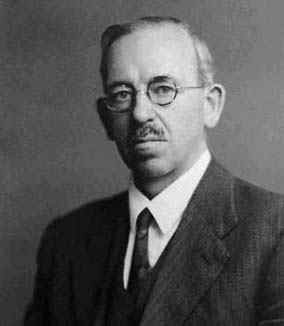
- Born: Ralph Howard Fowler; 17 January 1889; Roydon, England
- Died: 28 July 1944 (aged 55); Trumpington, England
- Education: Winchester College; Trinity College, Cambridge
- Known for: Darwin–Fowler method; Bernal–Fowler rules; Field electron emission; Zeroth law of thermodynamics
- Spouse: Eileen Rutherford (m. 1921)
- Children: 4, including Ruth
- Relatives: Ernest Rutherford (father-in-law); Robert Edwards (son-in-law); Mary Fowler (granddaughter)
- Awards: Rayleigh Prize (1913); Adams Prize (1924); FRS (1925); Royal Medal (1936)
- Scientific career
- Fields: Statistical physics; Thermodynamics
- Workplaces: University of Cambridge (1919–44)
- Academic advisors: Archibald Vivian Hill
- Doctoral students: John Lennard-Jones (1924); Paul Dirac (1926); Bertha Swirles (1929); William McCrea (1930); Harrie Massey (1932); S. Chandrasekhar (1933); Daulat Singh Kothari (1933); Homi J. Bhabha (1935); Maurice Pryce (1937)
- Other notable students: Charles Coulson; Edward Arthur Milne; Nevill Mott

Sir Ralph Howard Fowler (17 January 1889 – 28 July 1944) was a British mathematical physicist.

== Biography ==
Ralph Howard Fowler was born on 17 January 1889 in Roydon, England, the son of Howard Fowler from Burnham-on-Sea, and Frances Eva Dewhurst, the daughter of a cotton merchant from Manchester.

After attending Winchester College, Fowler won a scholarship to Trinity College, Cambridge, where he studied mathematics and became a Wrangler in Part II of the Mathematical Tripos.

In World War I, Fowler obtained a commission in the Royal Marine Artillery and was seriously wounded in his shoulder in the Gallipoli campaign. The wound enabled his friend Archibald Hill to use his talents properly. As Hill's second in command he worked on anti-aircraft ballistics in the Anti-Aircraft Experimental Section of HMS Excellent on Whale Island. He made a major contribution on the aerodynamics of spinning shells. He was awarded the OBE in 1918.

In 1919, Fowler returned to Trinity College, where he became College Lecturer in Mathematics the following year.

Fowler worked on thermodynamics and statistical mechanics, bringing a new approach to physical chemistry. With Arthur Milne, a comrade during the war, he wrote a seminal work on stellar spectra, temperatures, and pressures. In 1925, he was elected a Fellow of the Royal Society. He became research supervisor to Paul Dirac and, in 1926, worked with him on the statistical mechanics of white dwarf stars.

In 1927, Fowler was one of the participants of the fifth Solvay Conference on Physics that took place at the International Solvay Institute for Physics in Belgium. The following year, he published (with Lothar Nordheim) a seminal paper that explained the physical phenomenon now known as field electron emission, and helped to establish the validity of modern electron band theory. In 1931, he was the first to formulate and label the zeroth law of thermodynamics. The following year, he was appointed John Humphrey Plummer Professor of Mathematical Physics in the Cavendish Laboratory. In 1933, he worked with John Bernal to develop a model for the structure of water and ice known as the ice rules.

In 1939, when World War II began, he resumed his work with the Ordnance Board, despite poor health, and was chosen for scientific liaison with Canada and the United States. He knew America well, having visiting professorships at Princeton University and the University of Wisconsin–Madison. For this liaison work, he was knighted in 1942 (see MAUD Committee). He returned to Britain later in the war and worked for the Ordnance Board and the Admiralty up until a few weeks before his death in 1944.

Fifteen Fellows of the Royal Society and three Nobel Laureates (Chandrasekhar, Dirac, and Mott) were supervised by Fowler between 1922 and 1939. In addition to Milne, he worked with Sir Arthur Eddington, Subrahmanyan Chandrasekhar, Paul Dirac, Homi J. Bhabha, and Sir William McCrea. It was Fowler who introduced Dirac to quantum theory in 1923. Fowler also put Dirac and Werner Heisenberg in touch with each other through Niels Bohr. At Cambridge, he supervised the doctoral studies of 64 students, including John Lennard-Jones, Paul Dirac, and Garrett Birkhoff.

Fowler died on 28 July 1944 in Trumpington at the age of 55.

The Fowler Islands in Crystal Sound on the Antarctic Peninsula were named by the UK Antarctic Place-Names Committee in his honour.

== Personal life ==
Fowler was a keen amateur cricketer who played as a wicket-keeper. He played for Norfolk in the Minor Counties Championship in 1908 and 1909.

In 1921, Fowler married Eileen Mary (1901–1930), the only daughter of Ernest Rutherford. They had four children; two sons and two daughters.

One of their sons was the physicist Peter Fowler (1923-1996).

Eileen died after the birth of their last child, Ruth Fowler Edwards (1930-2013), a geneticist and wife of Robert G. (Bob) Edwards, the "father" of in vitro fertilisation and 2010 Nobel Prize in Physiology or Medicine laureate. One of his grandchildren is Mary Fowler, a geophysicist and the sixth Master (2012–2020) of Darwin College, Cambridge.

== Selected publications ==
- Elementary differential geometry of plane curves. Cambridge tracts in mathematics and mathematical physics ..; No. 20. Cambridge University Press. 1920. Dover reprint. 2005.
- Statistical mechanics, the theory of the properties of matter in equilibrium; based on an essay awarded the Adams prize in the University of Cambridge, 1923–24. Cambridge University Press. 1929. 2nd edition. 1936.
- Passage of electrons through surfaces and surface films; being the thirty-first Robert Boyle lecture. Oxford University Press. 1929.
- with E. A. Guggenheim: Statistical thermodynamics: a version of statistical mechanics for students of physics and chemistry. Cambridge University Press. 1939.
