= McConnel Islands =

Islands of Graham Land, Antarctica

The McConnel Islands (66°29′S 65°51′W) are islands lying in Darbel Bay southeast of the Kidd Islands, off the west coast of Graham Land, Antarctica. They were photographed by the Falkland Islands and Dependencies Aerial Survey Expedition, 1956–57, and were named by the UK Antarctic Place-Names Committee in 1960 for James C. McConnel (1860–1890), an English physicist who, along with Dudley Kidd, made pioneer experiments on the plastic deformation of ice, both single and polycrystals, 1881–90.

== See also ==
- List of Antarctic and sub-Antarctic islands
