= Fernando Bonilla-Musoles =

Spanish obstetrician and gynecologist

Fernando María Bonilla-Musoles (Valencia, 1944) is a Spanish obstetrician and gynecologist. In 1982, Bonilla's team began to develop in vitro propagation techniques of Britain's Robert Edwards, in Spain.

== Career ==
Bonilla graduated in Medicine from the University of Valencia in 1967, and received his PhD from that University in 1970. At that time, the first experimental apparatus for ultrasound in Gynecology were being developed. His family financed the acquisition of the first three devices in 1969, which were installed at the Hospital Clínico Universitario of Valencia, in the old maternity hospital La Cigüeña and his own private practice, and he introduced obstetric and gynecologic ultrasound in Latin America in 70s. In 1982, Bonilla's team began to develop in vitro propagation techniques of Britain's Robert Edwards pioneering in 1984 the first test tube baby gestate in Spain. The embryo, however, died in the womb, so it was the clinic Dexeus of Barcelona that won the first birth in Spain that same year. It was in 1985 when Bonilla's team scored the first birth, and six pregnancies at the Hospital Clínico de Valencia, making it the pioneer of the Spanish public health in this area. In 1990, he was involved with Dr. Pellicer and Dr. Remohi, in founding the Valencia Infertility Institute (IVI), the first Spanish institution dedicated entirely to assisted human reproduction.

Bonilla got his first professorship in Cadiz in 1977, but continued to work in his home town as a professor of obstetrics and gynecology at the University of Valencia, where it developed its teaching since 1979. He was head of the department of obstetrics and gynecology at the Hospital Clínico de Valencia until his retirement in 2014.

Among other responsibilities, he has held the presidency of the International Federation of Cervical Pathology and Colposcopy from 1978 to 1986, the World Organization president gestosis the years 1985 and 1986, and chairmanship of the Committee for the Study of Female Breast of the International Federation of Obstetrics and Gynecology from 1989 to 1998. He was elected president of the XXVI National Congress of Obstetrics and Gynecology of the Spanish Society of Gynecology and Obstetrics (SEGO), held in Valencia in 2001. Bonilla-Musoles was the first director of LA ASOCIACIÓN ESPAÑOLA DE PATOLOGÍA CERVICAL Y COLPOSCOPIA (AEPCC).

He is the author of 437 publications and 20 treaties and specialty books, several of them translated into Portuguese, German, Russian and English.

== Bibliography ==
- Ruíz Torres, Pedro; Villó y Ruíz, José (2000). Universitat de València (ed.). Discursos sobre la historia: Lecciones de apertura de curso en la Universidad de Valencia[1870–1937], pp. 367. ISBN 84-370-4393-X. (Spanish)
- Mancebo, María Fernanda; Tuñón de Lara, Manuel (1994). La Universidad de Valencia: de la monarquía a la república (1919–1939), pp. 429. ISBN 84-370-1603-7. (Spanish)
- González y González, Enrique; Pérez Puente, Leticia (2001). Permanencia y cambio: Universidades hispánicas 1551–2001. ISBN 970-32-2729-5. (Spanish)
