= Nakaya Islands =

Island group in Graham Land, Antarctica

- Location within Antarctica

Geography
- Location: Antarctica
- Coordinates: 66°27′S 66°14′W

Administration
- Administered under the Antarctic Treaty System

Demographics
- Population: Uninhabited

The Nakaya Islands are a small group of islands in Crystal Sound, about 18 km northeast of Cape Rey, Graham Land in Antarctica. They were named by United Kingdom Antarctic Place-Names Committee (UK-APC) after Ukichiro Nakaya (1900–62), a Japanese Professor of Physics from the Hokkaido University, who specialized in the field of investigating the structure of ice crystals and snowflakes.

== Surveying & Mapping ==
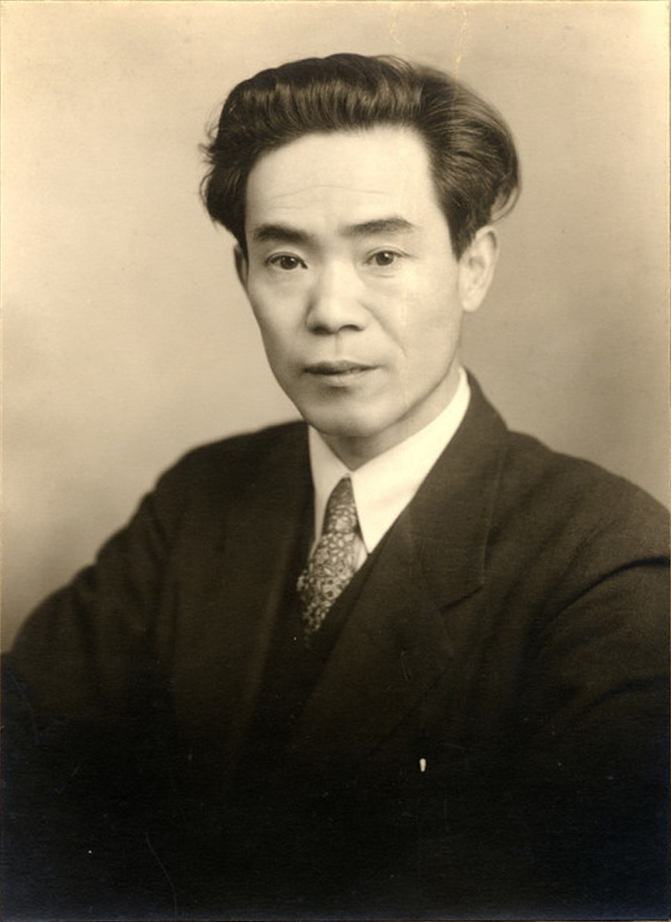
Ukichiro Nakaya after whom the islands are named

The islands were photographed from the air by Falkland Islands and Dependencies Aerial Survey Expedition (FIDASE) from 1956 to 1957 and then mapped from surveys by Falkland Islands Dependencies Survey (FIDS) (1958–59).

== Flora & Fauna ==
Various flora and fauna live around the islands such as penguins, krill, Petrels and Mosses.

== See also ==
- List of Antarctic and sub-Antarctic islands
