= ENGIN-X =

Materials science beamline in Oxfordshire, England

Coordinates: 51°34′18″N 1°19′12″W

ENGIN-X is the dedicated materials engineering beamline at the ISIS Neutron and Muon Source in the UK.

The beamline uses neutron diffraction to determine the spacing between layers of atoms in order to measure elastic strain, and thus residual stress deep within crystalline materials. In other words, it uses the atomic lattice planes as an 'atomic strain gauge'. Internal and residual stress in materials have a considerable effect on material properties, including fatigue resistance, fracture toughness and strength.

== Applications ==
- measurement of residual stress in engineering components
- in situ studies of thermomechanical processing of engineering relevant materials
- studies of displacive phase transformations under stress, temperature and electric field
- rock deformation studies
- non-destructive examination of manufacture processes in historical and archaeological artefacts
