= Shull Rocks =

Island chain in Antarctica

Coordinates: 66°27′S 66°40′W

Shull Rocks is a chain of low snow-covered rocks and one small island, lying in Crystal Sound about 10 miles (16 km) northwest of Cape Rey, Graham Land in the Antarctic Peninsula. Mapped from surveys by Falkland Islands Dependencies Survey (FIDS) (1958–59). Named by United Kingdom Antarctic Place-Names Committee (UK-APC) for Clifford G. Shull, American physicist who used neutron diffraction to determine the position of the hydrogen atoms in ice.
