= P. G. Owston =

British chemist and crystallographer

Philip George Owston (January 1921 – September 2001) was a British chemist and crystallographer for whom the Owston Islands (66°22′59″S 66°6′0″W) in Antarctica are named. Owston was born in Saltburn-by-the-Sea, Yorkshire, England during January 1921 as the son of Edward Owston and Margaret Smith. He died in Watford, Hertfordshire, England in September 2001.

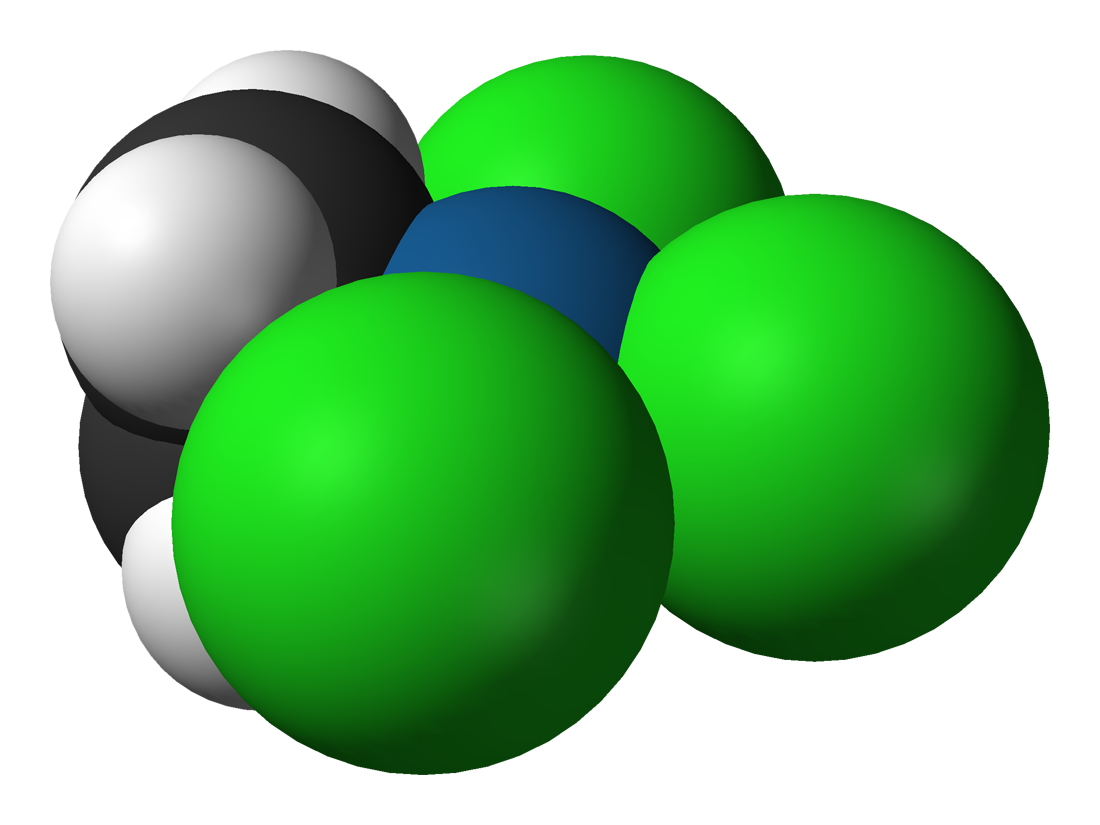
Space-filling model of [(η^{2}-C_{2}H_{4})PtCl_{3}]^{−}, the anion of Zeise's salt, based on X-ray crystallographic data

Owston's crystallography work included the determination of the structure of Zeise's salt, the anion of which is shown at right. Zeise's salt, K[PtCl_{3}(η^{2}-C_{2}H_{4})]·H_{2}O, was reported in 1831 and was one of the first organometallic compounds ever discovered. However, the nature of the platinum to ethylene bond in the compound was not understood until the development of the Dewar–Chatt–Duncanson model in the 1950s. The space-filling model from the Owston crystal structure clearly shows that it is an organometallic species as there is direct bonding between the platinum metal centre (in blue) and the two carbon atoms of the ethylene ligand (in black).

In 1964, Owston wrote an article in New Scientist on the use of electron spin resonance spectroscopy in chemistry.
