= Kidd Islands =

Island group in Graham Land, Antarctica

- Location within Antarctica

Geography
- Location: Antarctica
- Coordinates: 66°27′S 65°59′W

Administration
- Administered under the Antarctic Treaty System

Demographics
- Population: Uninhabited

The Kidd Islands are a small group of islands within Darbel Bay, lying just south of the Darbel Islands off the west coast of Graham Land, Antarctica. They were photographed by the Falkland Islands and Dependencies Aerial Survey Expedition in 1956–57, and were named by the UK Antarctic Place-Names Committee in 1960 for D.A. Kidd, a British physicist who in 1888, with J.C. McConnel, made pioneer tests of the deformation of ice single crystals.

== See also ==
- List of Antarctic and sub-Antarctic islands
