= Pauling Islands =

Group of islands in Crystal Sound, Antarctica

Pauling Islands (66°32′S 66°58′W) is a separate group of islands lying 3 nautical miles (6 km) southeast of Barcroft Islands, in Crystal Sound. Mapped from surveys by Falkland Islands Dependencies Survey (FIDS) (1958–59). Named by United Kingdom Antarctic Place-Names Committee (UK-APC) for Linus C. Pauling, American chemist; originator of a theory of the structure of ice, in about 1935.

== See also ==
- List of Antarctic and sub-Antarctic islands
