= Gagge Point =

Gagge Point (66°20′S 66°54′W) is the southern extremity of Lavoisier Island, Biscoe Islands. It was mapped from air photos obtained by the Falkland Islands and Dependencies Aerial Survey Expedition (1956–57), and was named by the UK Antarctic Place-Names Committee for Adolph P. Gagge, an American physiologist who has specialized in the reactions of the human body to cold environments.
