= Ukichiro Nakaya =

Japanese physicist and science essayist (1900–1962)

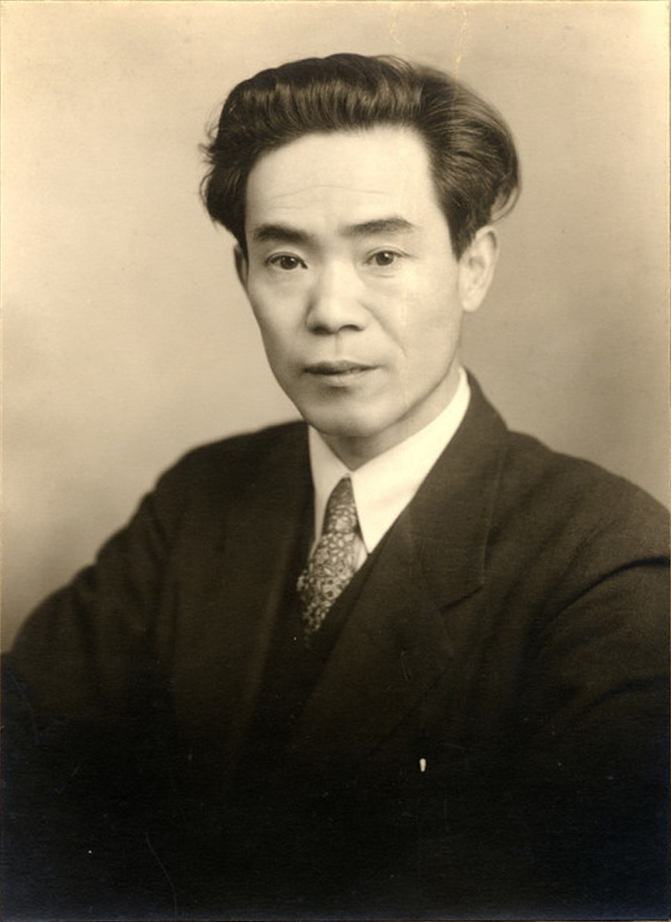
- Nakaya in 1946
- Born: July 4, 1900; Kaga, Ishikawa
- Died: April 11, 1962 (aged 61)
- Education: University of Tokyo; King's College London
- Known for: Artificial snowflakes
- Scientific career
- Fields: Physics

Ukichiro Nakaya (中谷 宇吉郎, Nakaya Ukichirō; July 4, 1900 – April 11, 1962) was a Japanese physicist and science essayist known for his work in glaciology and low-temperature sciences. He is credited with making the first artificial snowflakes.

== Life and research ==
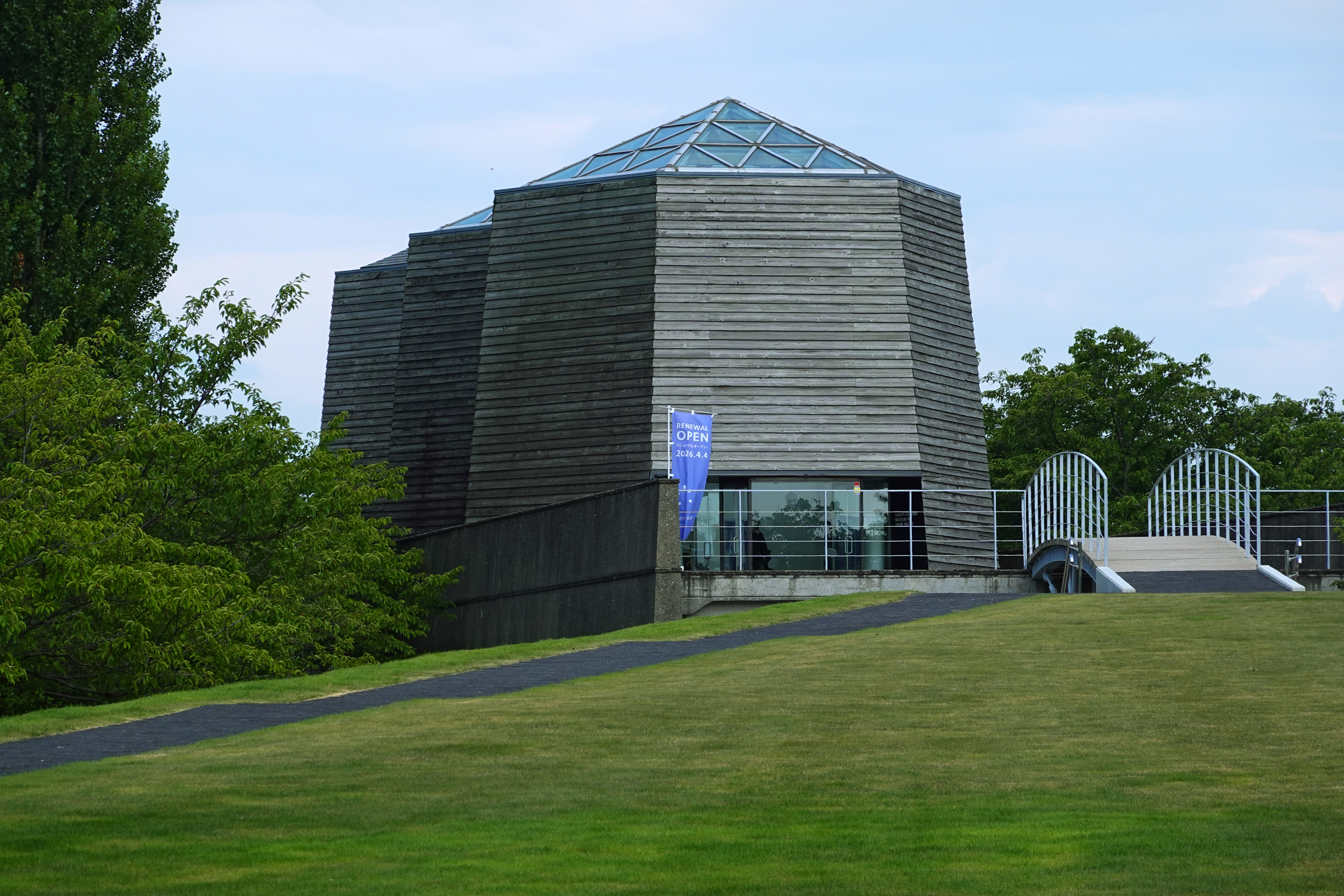
Nakaya Ukichiro Museum of Snow and Ice (the hexagonal building, echoing the six-sided nature of snowflakes), at Katayamazu hot springs, Kaga, Ishikawa, Japan

Nakaya was born near the Katayamazu hot springs in Kaga, Ishikawa Prefecture, near the area depicted in Hokuetsu Seppu, an encyclopedic work published in 1837 that contains 183 sketches of natural snowflake crystals – the subject that became Nakaya's life work. Nakaya later wrote that his father wanted him to be a potter and sent him to live with a potter while he was in primary school. His father died after he finished primary school, but Nakaya's first scientific paper, written in 1924 for the inaugural issue of the proceedings of the Physics Department of Tokyo Imperial University, was devoted to Japanese Kutani porcelain.

Nakaya was inspired to study physics in high school by the nebular hypotheses of Kant and Laplace and by the works of Hajime Tanabe. He majored in experimental physics under Torahiko Terada at Tokyo Imperial University and graduated in 1925. Soon thereafter, he became Terada's research assistant at the Institute of Physical and Chemical Research (RIKEN). Nakaya studied electrostatic discharge as an assistant professor at Tokyo Imperial University. In 1928 and 1929, he continued his graduate studies at King's College London under Owen Willans Richardson, where he worked with long-wavelength X-rays. In 1930, he became an assistant professor at Hokkaido University, with which he would be associated for the rest of his life, and later that year he received his doctor of science degree from Kyoto Imperial University.

When he arrived at Hokkaido University, the physics department had a minimum of equipment and few research funds. But there was an unlimited supply of natural snow, so Nakaya began his research into snow crystals. From over 3,000 photomicrographs he established a general classification of natural snow crystals. In 1935, he opened the Low Temperature Science Laboratory, and on March 12, 1936, created the first artificial snow crystal.

From 1936 until 1938, Nakaya and his family lived at a hot springs resort on the Izu Peninsula while he recuperated from a bout of clonorchiasis. After his recovery, he began his studies of frost heaving which eventually led to the founding of the Laboratory of Agricultural Physics at Hokkaido University in 1946. In 1941, he received the Imperial Prize of the Japan Academy for his contributions to snow crystal research.

In 1943, two years after the Pacific War began, Nakaya moved to a newly built atmospheric icing observatory at Mt. Niseko-Annupuri, a 1,308 meter (4,290 ft) mountain in Hokkaido. A Zero fighter plane was brought to the observatory in the hope of finding ways to prevent atmospheric icing. The following year, Nakaya moved to the Nemuro coast to study artificial dissipation of fog. After the war, he continued his research for the Laboratory of Agricultural Physics into flood and snowmelt in drainage basins.

Nakaya always enjoyed field work as well as laboratory research. His studies took him to locations ranging from the top of Mauna Loa, Hawaii to the ice island T-3 in the Canadian Arctic Archipelago. In 1949, on the invitation of the International Glaciological Society (an organization in which he later served as co-chairman), Nakaya toured the United States and Canada and attended the meeting establishing SIPRE (Snow, Ice and Permafrost Research Establishment). From 1952 until 1954, he was a research fellow at SIPRE. During this time, he lived in Winnetka, Illinois and studied Tyndall figures – melt figures that develop inside large crystals of glacial ice after exposure to bright sunlight, which were first described by the British physicist John Tyndall.

In 1957 he visited Greenland as a member of the United States expedition for the International Geophysical Year. He visited Greenland several more times, usually staying for a month or two at a time, to observe the glaciological ice cap at the latitude 78° observatory site.

In 1960, Nakaya underwent surgery for prostate cancer at the hospital at the University of Tokyo. He died on April 11, 1962, of osteomyelitis. In recognition of his achievements, he was posthumously decorated with one of the highest orders awarded by the Japanese government.

In 1960, the UK Antarctic Place-Names Committee named a group of Antarctic islands the "Nakaya Islands" in recognition of his contributions to science. The asteroid 10152 Ukichiro is also named after him.

== Snow crystals ==
From 1933, Nakaya observed natural snow and created 3,000 photographic plates of snow crystals, classifying them into seven major and numerous minor types. In the course of these observations, taking photographs of natural snow and sorting them by appearance according to weather conditions, Nakaya felt the need to make artificial snow from ice crystals grown in the laboratory. He generated water vapor in a dual-layer hollow glass tube, which was then cooled. Contrary to his initial expectations, creating snow crystals was not an easy task – instead of forming into snowflakes, the ice crystals grew like caterpillars on the cotton string he used for nucleation.

The Low Temperature Science Laboratory opened in 1935, and experiments continued with various materials for the ice nucleus. These experiments revealed that woolen string is better than cotton string; however, the snow crystals were still not forming as intended. One day Nakaya found a snow crystal on the tip of a hair of a rabbit-fur coat in the lab. This was the breakthrough that led to the production of the first artificial snow crystal. On March 12, 1936, three years after the first attempt, he produced a snow crystal on the tip of a single hair of rabbit fur in his laboratory apparatus. In December 1937, he took photographs of many types of artificial snow crystals in his lab. Such photographs, collected in Bentley's book Snow Crystals, which Nakaya admired greatly, later influenced Nakaya's own work.

Nakaya continued his research into snow crystals and elucidated how their various patterns are produced in nature. He published his Nakaya Diagram, which describes the relationships among vapor, temperature, supersaturation, and excess vapor density in clouds. In 1954, Harvard University Press published his Snow Crystals: Natural and Artificial, an illustrated work that summarized his research on snowflake crystals, starting from his work at Hokkaido University. Though long out of print, it still serves as a classic reference on crystal shapes, showing how a scientific investigation can proceed through systematic observation toward an accurate description of a natural phenomenon.

Nakaya's achievement is commemorated today by a hexagonal stone monument at the site of his laboratory on the campus of Hokkaido University. His original apparatus is preserved and on display at The Institute for Low Temperature Science.

== Essays on science ==
... snow crystals may be called letters sent from heaven.

— Ukichiro Nakaya, Snow Crystals (1939)

Nakaya was also a prolific science essayist. A select bibliography at the website of the Nakaya Ukichiro Museum of Snow and Ice lists more than 40 titles that explained science for the general public, on topics ranging from snow and geophysics to archaeology and the scientific method.

He also produced a number of documentary films and radio programs. In 1950, he played a central role in the founding of Iwanami Productions, which went on to produce more than 4,000 documentary and educational films. (The films are now available from Hitachi Media Productions in digital form as the Iwanami Film Library.)

His most famous quote is probably "Snowflakes are letters sent from heaven." He returned to this idea several times, first in his 1939 documentary film Snow Crystals, and again in a handwritten note in a copy of his 1954 book Snow Crystals: Natural and Artificial.

== Personal life ==
Nakaya married twice. His first wife was the daughter of Sakutaro Fujioka (藤岡作太郎, Fujioka Sakutarō), a literary historian who taught at Tokyo Imperial University. She died in Japan of diphtheria while Nakaya was studying at King's College. He remarried in 1932. His daughter Fujiko Nakaya, born in 1933, is an artist known for her fog sculptures. He had two other daughters, Sakiko and Miyoko Nakaya.

In his later life, Nakaya was an accomplished sumi-e artist.

== Bibliography ==
- Nakaya, Ukichiro (1954). Snow Crystals: Natural and Artificial. Harvard University Press. ISBN 978-0-674-81151-5.
- Daub, Edward E.; Asano, Shiro, eds. (2003). Reflections on Science by NAKAYA Ukichiro, An Advanced Japanese Reader. University of Wisconsin Press. ISBN 0-299-18104-9. Archived from the original on 2008-07-05. (In Japanese, with readings, vocabulary notes, translations, and glossary.)

== See also ==
- Egg of Li Chun
