= Simon Fishel =

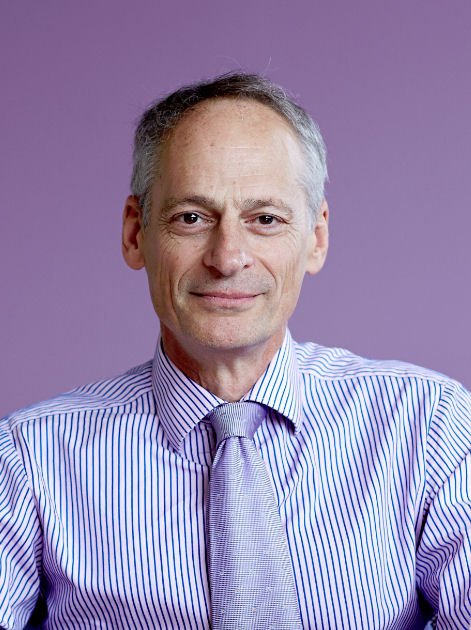
- Born: Simon Brian Fishel; 29 July 1953; Liverpool, England
- Education: University of Cambridge
- Known for: Pioneer of in-vitro fertilisation
- Awards: Honorary Fellowship from Liverpool John Moores University
- Scientific career
- Fields: In-vitro fertilisation, human reproduction, fertility and reproductive physiology
- Workplaces: University of Salford; University of Cambridge; Churchill College, Cambridge; CARE Fertility Group

Simon Fishel (born 29 July 1953) is an English physiologist, biochemist and pioneering in vitro fertilisation (IVF) specialist.

Fishel joined Robert Edwards in 1975 and later worked alongside Edwards and Patrick Steptoe, the two people that pioneered conception through IVF, leading to the birth of Louise Brown on 25 July 1978.

== Early life and education ==
Simon Brian Fishel was born to a Jewish family in Liverpool and grew up close to Calderstones Park. His father, Joseph, was a tailor and his mother, Jane, was one of 12 siblings from a family of Eastern European refugees.

Fishel was educated at King David High School, Liverpool, where he became Head Boy.

After securing A-Levels, Fishel initially taught at a school in Speke, on the outskirts of Liverpool. He then studied Physiology and Biochemistry at the University of Salford, graduating in 1975 with double first-class BSc Honours.

Fishel moved to the University of Cambridge after being appointed to a PhD position in virology, but soon decided that a career studying viruses was not for him. He then met future Nobel Prize-winner Robert Edwards, under whose supervision he would earn a PhD and enter the field to which he would commit his life's work.

In 1978, Fishel was appointed as a Don at Churchill College, Cambridge and was also awarded the Beit Memorial Foundation Fellowship.

== Career ==
At Cambridge, Fishel worked with Robert Edwards and Patrick Steptoe for a number of years before the birth of the world's first IVF baby, Louise Brown, in Oldham in 1978. This success made medical history, establishing in vitro fertilisation as a new treatment option that could help infertile couples have children.

While continuing his work at Cambridge, Fishel was appointed as Deputy Scientific Director at the world's first IVF clinic, Bourn Hall, joining Scientific Director Edwards, Medical Director Steptoe and Deputy Medical Director John Webster in 1980.

During these controversial early years of IVF, Fishel and his colleagues received extensive opposition from critics both outside of and within the medical and scientific communities, including a civil writ for murder. Fishel has since stated that "the whole establishment was outraged" by their early work and that people thought that he was "potentially a mad scientist".

In 1981, Fishel, Robert Edwards and other colleagues at Bourn Hall organised the first international IVF conference, which was attended by pioneering clinicians and scientists from around the world. Shortly after this, Fishel's colleague Robert Edwards would co-found the European Society of Human Reproduction and Embryology and establish the journal Human Reproduction to enable greater reporting of developments and breakthroughs in the field.

Fishel's work has included numerous breakthroughs. One of his earliest contributions was to move away from test tubes (hence the term 'test-tube baby') and towards the use of petri dishes with culture medium overlaid with paraffin oil in the practice of clinical embryology, a step which made it more practical when IVF was eventually used to retrieve multiple eggs during ovarian stimulation for the purpose of producing multiple follicles.

Fishel demonstrated for the first time that human embryos secrete the pregnancy hormone hCG in a 1984 publication with Edwards and Chris Evans in Science that has been cited 196 times and identified by Outi Hovatta as the first description of the potential of IVF and stem cell technology in terms of medicinal benefit. He also demonstrated the need to permanently immobilise the sperm tail for successful intracytoplasmic sperm injection (ICSI).

In the 1980s, Fishel sought out Falmouth-based micro-electronics firm Research Instruments to help him develop tools for the earliest beginnings of sperm microinjection. However, British regulators would not grant Fishel a licence for a pilot scheme, meaning he had to pioneer the technique, known as sub-zonal insemination (SUZI), in Italy.

In Rome, Fishel and his team reported the first birth from SUZI in 1990, which was televised by Italian television station Rai Uno, and described a clinical pregnancy rate of 15 per cent from 225 SUZI cycles a year later. As the first micro-insemination technique for treating male infertility, SUZI was a novel technology that allowed men with poor semen parameters and no other chance of achieving fertilisation to father their own genetic children. It was licensed as a technique in Britain in 1991, with the first SUZI birth in the UK taking place in September 1992 at the Park Hospital in Nottingham.

Fishel and colleagues went on to offer direct injection of sperm into the cytoplasm of the oocyte, or ‘DISCO’, as an alternative treatment for patients for whom SUZI had failed. These techniques would eventually be developed into intracytoplasmic sperm injection, while Research Instruments would go on to provide IVF equipment and technology to clinics around the world.

Fishel introduced embryo vitrification to the UK in 1991, with the first baby to be born in the country from this technique being delivered in October 1992. However, this procedure was then initially banned by the Human Fertilisation and Embryology Authority (HFEA), a decision later criticised by Fishel when he gave a supplementary memorandum in parliament in 1997 as part of the Draft Human Tissue and Embryos Bill.

Fishel has published more than 200 papers, as well as a number of books, including the 1986 bestseller In Vitro Fertilisation: Past Present and Future. In 1987, he was part of the first team invited by the World Health Organization to introduce IVF to mainland China.

Together with Steven D. Fleming, in 1992 Fishel established the world's first master's degree courses in assisted reproduction technology at the University of Nottingham, where he had already opened a fertility service.

Fishel co-founded independent specialist CARE Fertility in 1997 to provide fertility services to private and NHS patients.

Fishel has received honorary awards from countries such as Japan, South Africa, Austria and Italy, and has advised numerous international governments, as well as the Vatican.

In 2009, he received an Honorary Fellowship from Liverpool John Moores University for his "outstanding contributions to the field of fertility treatment, including embryology and IVF".

Fishel was named at number ten in the '100 hottest health gurus' by women's health and wellbeing magazine Top Santé in its September 2013 issue, selected due to his co-creation of the time-lapse embryo imaging process CAREmaps, a development Fishel himself called the most exciting and significant since he began his career.

In a November 2013 issue of the journal Reproductive BioMedicine Online, Fishel called for the NHS to permit its IVF patients to take part in privately funded trials of new additional techniques, adding that the current position was "preventing progress".

== Personal life ==
Fishel lives in Nottingham and has four children and one grandchild. His second-eldest child is the musician, producer and record label owner Matt Fishel.

In 1993, Fishel was nominated by readers of the Liverpool Echo as one of Merseyside's 'top 100 living legends'.

On 17 October 2000, Fishel was on board the train involved in the Hatfield rail crash. He escaped with minor injuries and helped assist other passengers at the scene before emergency services arrived.

== See also ==
- UK labour law
