= George Owston =

English cricketer

Personal information
- Full name: George Welborn Owston
- Born: 7 December 1800; Leicester
- Died: 10 September 1848 (aged 47); Leicester
- Role: Batsman

Domestic team information
- Years: Team
- 1821–1829: Leicester Cricket Club
- 1826: Sheffield and Leicester
- Source: CricketArchive, 22 June 2013

George Welborn Owston (7 December 1800 – 10 September 1848) was an English cricketer who was recorded in one match in 1826 when he played for a combined Sheffield and Leicester team, scoring 0 runs in his only innings and holding one catch. Owston played for Leicester Cricket Club from 1821 to 1829.

== Bibliography ==
- Haygarth, Arthur (1996) [1862]. Scores & Biographies, Volume 1 (1744–1826). Kennington: Frederick Lillywhite. ISBN 978-19-00592-23-9.
- Haygarth, Arthur (1997) [1862]. Scores & Biographies, Volume 2 (1827–1840). Kennington: Frederick Lillywhite. ISBN 978-19-00592-23-9.
