= Sillard Islands =

Islands in Antarctica

Sillard Islands (66°37′S 67°35′W) is a group of small ice-covered islands lying close to Cape Mascart, the northeast extremity of Adelaide Island. Discovered by the French Antarctic Expedition, 1908–10, under Charcot, and named for Director Sillard of the French Montevideo Co., Montevideo, Uruguay, whose company made repairs on Charcot's ship, the Pourquoi Pas ?.

== See also ==
- List of Antarctic and sub-Antarctic islands
