= Bjerrum defect =

Crystallographic defect affecting the electrical properties of ice

A Bjerrum defect is a crystallographic defect which is specific to ice, and which is partly responsible for the electrical properties of ice. It was first proposed by Niels Bjerrum in 1952 in order to explain the electrical polarization of ice in an electric field. A hydrogen bond normally has one proton, but a hydrogen bond with a Bjerrum defect will have either two protons (D defect, from "doppel" in German, meaning "double") or no proton (L defect, from "leer" in German, meaning "empty"). D-defects are more energetically favorable than L-defects. The unfavorable defect strain is resolved when a water molecule pivots about an oxygen atom to produce hydrogen bonds with single protons. Dislocations of ice Ih along a slip plane create pairs of Bjerrum defects, one D defect and one L defect.

Nonpolar molecules such as methane can form clathrate hydrates with water, especially under high pressure. Although there is no hydrogen bonding of water molecules when methane is the guest molecule of the clathrate, guest-host hydrogen bonding often forms with guest molecules in clathrates of many larger organic molecules, such as pinacolone and tetrahydrofuran. In such cases, the guest-host hydrogen bonds result in the formation of L-type Bjerrum defect in the clathrate lattice. Oxygen atoms (in alcohol or carbonyl functional groups) and nitrogen atoms (in amine functional groups) in the guest molecules lead to transient hydrogen bonds and misoriented water molecules in the hydrate lattice.

== See also ==
- Ice rules
