= William Draper Harkins =

American chemist (1873-1951)

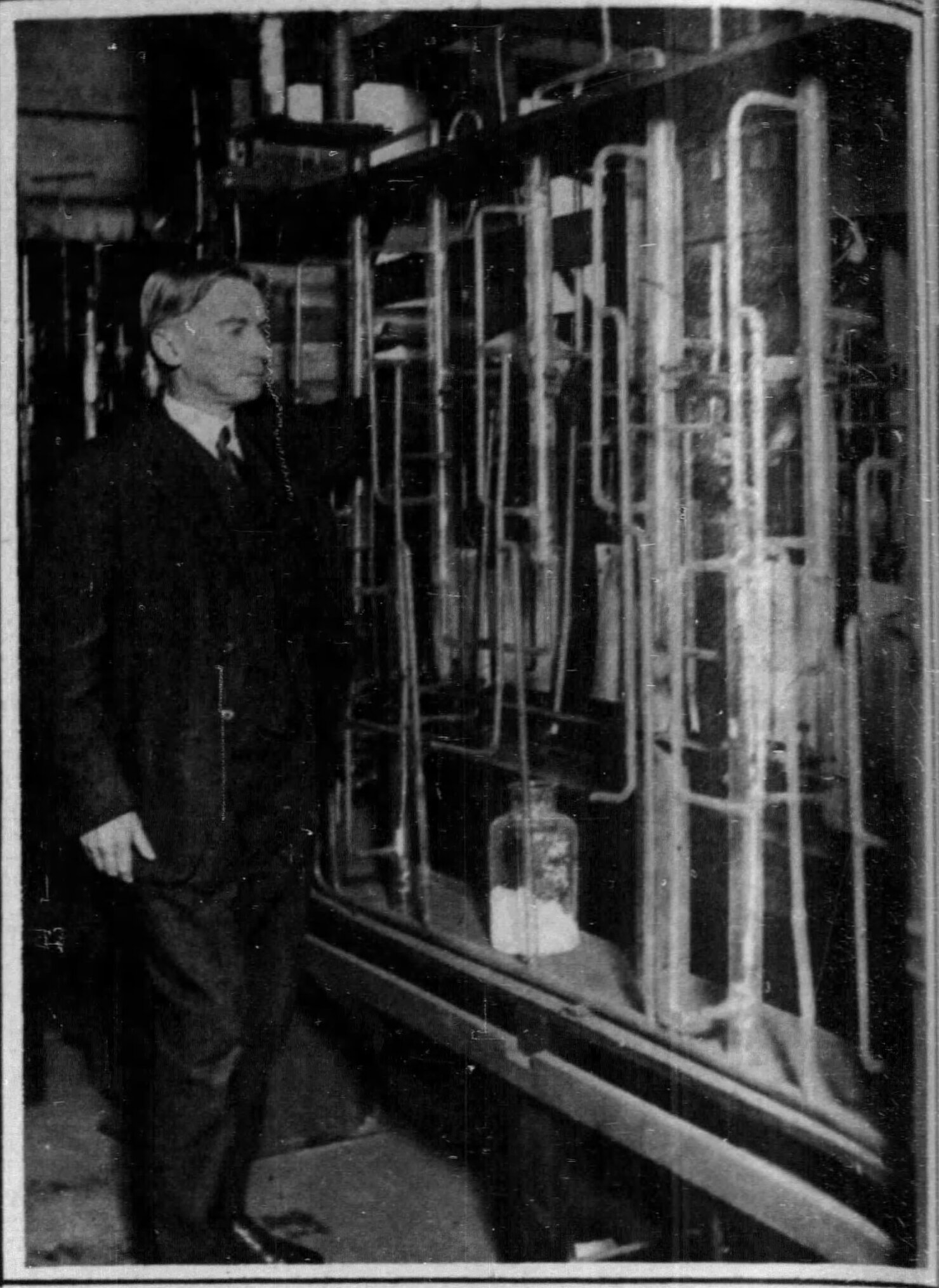
- Photograph of Harkins taken before 1928 with a scientific apparatus.
- Born: December 28, 1873; Titusville, Pennsylvania, US
- Died: March 7, 1951 (aged 77); Chicago, US
- Education: Stanford University
- Awards: Willard Gibbs Award (1928)
- Scientific career
- Fields: nuclear chemistry
- Workplaces: University of Montana; University of Chicago
- Doctoral students: Lyle Benjamin Borst; Robert S. Mulliken; Martin Kamen

William Draper Harkins (December 28, 1873 – March 7, 1951) was an American physical chemist, noted for his contributions to surface chemistry and nuclear chemistry. He is also recognized now as one of the first environmental chemists. Harkins and his student E.D. Wilson made careful analysis of the atomic nucleus demonstrating difference between chemical and atomic species now called isotopes. As part of this work Harkin was the first to analyze the abundance of elements in meteors as a indication of composition of the Early Solar System. As a visiting professor with Fritz Haber in 1909, he was introduced to the study of surface tension, and he began work on the theory of solutions and solubility during a visit to MIT in 1909-1910.

Harkins was born in Titusville, Pennsylvania, and graduated with a PhD from Stanford University in 1907 under Robert E. Swain. He subsequently taught chemistry at the University of Montana from 1900 to 1912, and then spent the rest of his career at the University of Chicago.

Harkins correctly predicted the existence of the neutron in 1920 (as a proton–electron complex) and was the first to use the word neutron in connection with the atomic nucleus. The neutron was detected experimentally by James Chadwick in 1932. In the beginning of the 1930s, Harkins constructed the second ever cyclotron with fellow University of Chicago scientist Robert James Moon, improving greatly on the design of the previous one. Among other University of Chicago scientists who made use of this cyclotron was Enrico Fermi, who performed neutron transport experiments. Since 1978, the magnet yoke of the cyclotron Harkins built has been on display at Fermilab.

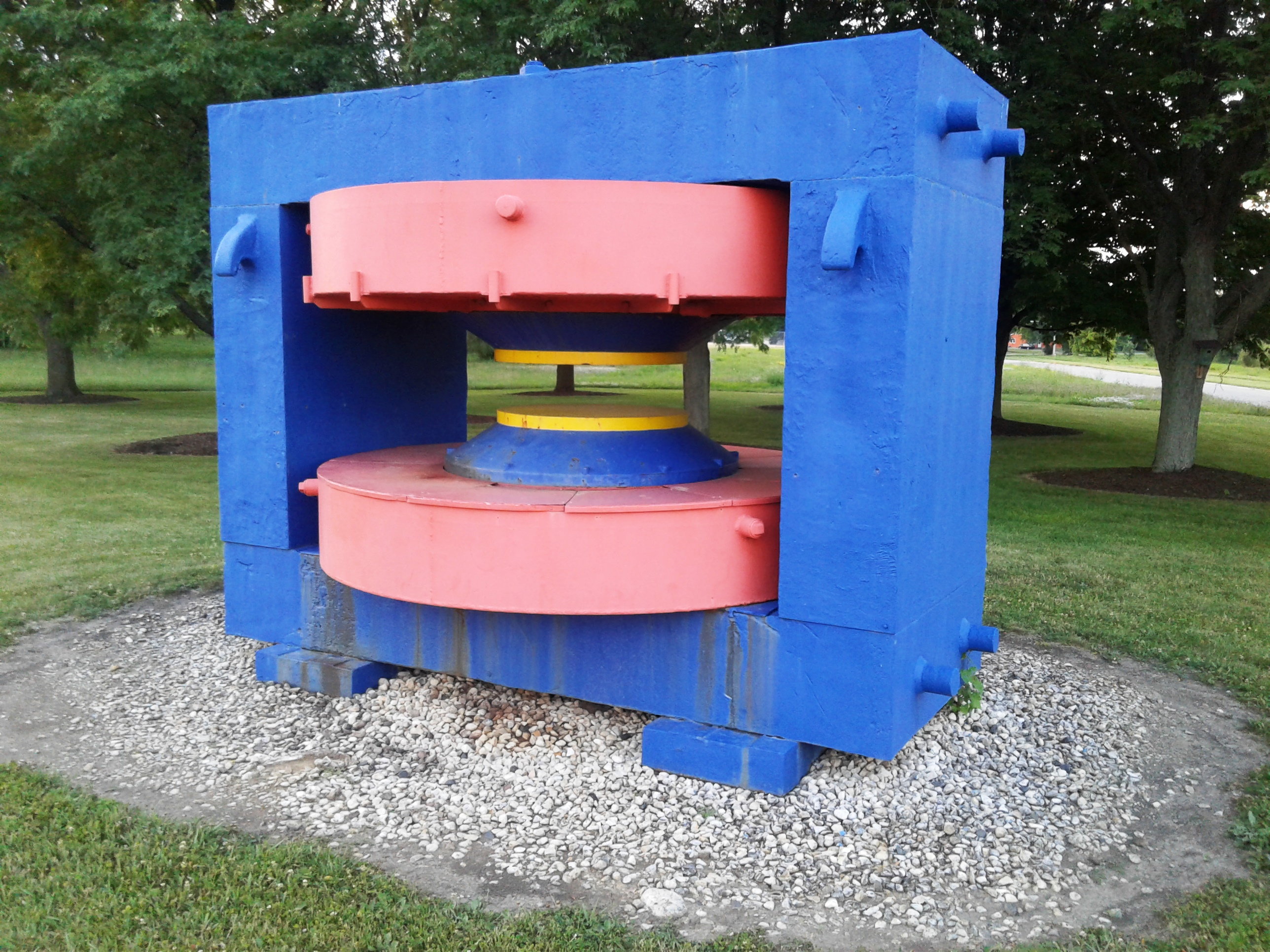
The magnet yoke from the cyclotron built in 1935 by Professor William D. Harkins and colleagues at the University of Chicago was moved in 1978 to Fermi National Accelerator Laboratory near Batavia, Illinois, where it is on display. Photo: William S. Higgins

Harkins was elected to the United States National Academy of Sciences in 1921 and the American Philosophical Society in 1925.

Among his students were Robert Mulliken, Lyle Benjamin Borst, Calvin Souther Fuller, Martin Kamen, Henry W. Newson, Samuel Allison, and Robert James Moon.

Harkins died in Chicago. He is buried at Oak Woods Cemetery.
