= Ice rules =

Principles governing bonding in ice

In chemistry, ice rules are basic principles that govern arrangement of atoms in water ice. They are also known as Bernal–Fowler rules, after British physicists John Desmond Bernal and Ralph H. Fowler who first described them in 1933.

The rules state each oxygen is covalently bonded to two hydrogen atoms, and that the oxygen atom in each water molecule forms two hydrogen bonds with other water molecules, so that there is precisely one hydrogen between each pair of oxygen atoms.

In other words, in ordinary I_{h} ice, every oxygen is bonded to the total of four hydrogens, two of these bonds are strong and two of them are much weaker. Every hydrogen is bonded to two oxygens, strongly to one and weakly to the other. The resulting configuration is geometrically a periodic lattice. The distribution of bonds on this lattice is represented by a directed-graph (arrows) and can be either ordered or disordered. In 1935, Linus Pauling used the ice rules to calculate the residual entropy (zero temperature entropy) of ice I_{h}. For this (and other) reasons the rules are sometimes mis-attributed and referred to as "Pauling's ice rules" (not to be confused with Pauling's rules for ionic crystals).

A nice figure of the resulting structure can be found in Hamann.

== See also ==
- Ice-type model
- Bjerrum defect
