= Darbel Islands =

Island group in Graham Land, Antarctica

The Darbel Islands (66°23′S 65°58′W) are a group of islands and rocks extending southwest from Cape Bellue for 5 nautical miles (9 km) across the entrance to Darbel Bay, off the west coast of Graham Land. They were charted in 1930 by Discovery Investigations personnel on the Discovery II and named Marin Darbel Islands after the bay in which they were found. Both names have since been shortened by the UK Antarctic Place-Names Committee.

== See also ==
- List of Antarctic and sub-Antarctic islands
