= Clifford Shull =

American physicist (1915–2001)

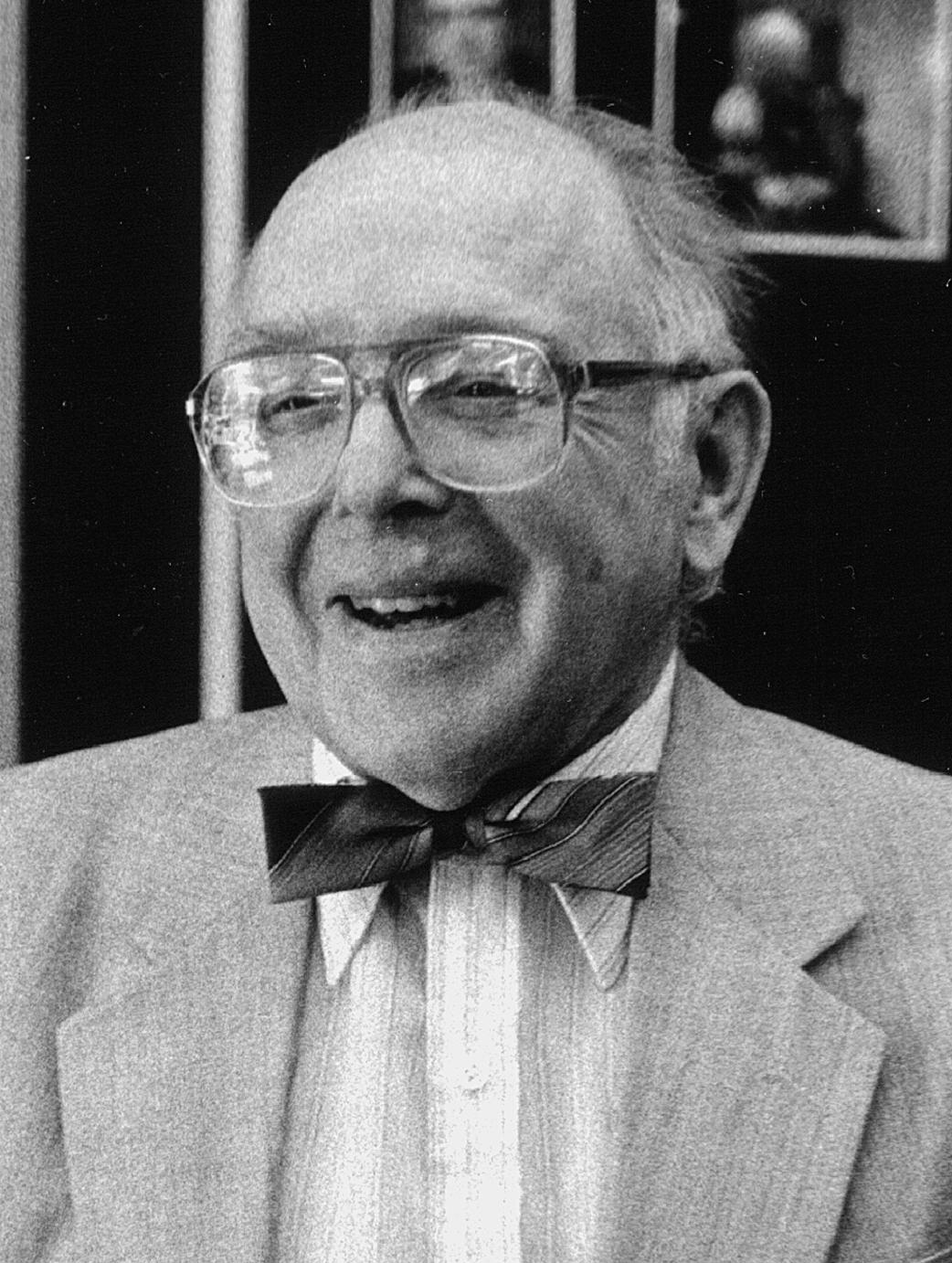
- Shull in 1994
- Born: September 23, 1915; Pittsburgh, Pennsylvania
- Died: March 31, 2001 (aged 85); Medford, Massachusetts
- Education: Carnegie Institute of Technology; New York University
- Known for: Neutron scattering
- Awards: Oliver E. Buckley Condensed Matter Prize (1956); Gregori Aminoff Prize (1993); Nobel Prize in Physics (1994)
- Scientific career
- Fields: Physics
- Doctoral advisor: Richard T. Cox

Clifford Glenwood Shull (September 23, 1915 in Pittsburgh, Pennsylvania – March 31, 2001) was an American physicist.

== Biography ==
Shull attended Schenley High School in Pittsburgh, received his BS from Carnegie Institute of Technology and PhD from New York University. He worked for The Texas Company at Beacon, New York during the wartime, followed by a position in the Clinton Laboratory (Oak Ridge National Laboratory), and finally joined MIT in 1955, and retired in 1986.

He died on March 31, 2001, at the age 85.

== Research ==
Clifford G. Shull was awarded the 1994 Nobel Prize in Physics with Canadian Bertram Brockhouse. The two won the prize for the development of the neutron scattering technique. He also conducted research on condensed matter. Professor Shull's prize was awarded for his pioneering work in neutron scattering, a technique that reveals where atoms are within a material like ricocheting bullets reveal where obstacles are in the dark.

When a beam of neutrons is directed at a given material, the neutrons bounce off, or are scattered by, atoms in the sample being investigated. The neutrons' directions change, depending on the location of the atoms they hit, and a diffraction pattern of the atoms' positions can then be obtained. Understanding where atoms are in a material and how they interact with one another is the key to understanding a material's properties.

"Then we can think of how we can make better window glass, better semiconductors, better microphones. All of these things go back to understanding the basic science behind their operation," Professor Shull, then 79, said on the day of the Nobel announcement. ...

He started [his pioneering work] in 1946 at what is now Oak Ridge National Laboratory. At that time, he said, "Scientists at Oak Ridge were very anxious to find real honest-to-goodness scientific uses for the information and technology that had been developed during the war at Oak Ridge and at other places associated with the wartime Manhattan Project."

Professor Shull teamed up with Ernest Wollan, and for the next nine years they explored ways of using the neutrons produced by nuclear reactors to probe the atomic structure of materials.

In Professor Shull's opinion the most important problem he worked on at the time dealt with determining the positions of hydrogen atoms in materials.

"Hydrogen atoms are ubiquitous in all biological materials and in many other inorganic materials," he once said, "but you couldn't see them with other techniques. With neutrons it turned out that that was completely different, and we were very pleased and happy to find that we could learn things about hydrogen-containing structures."

As he refined the scattering technique, Professor Shull studied the fundamental properties of the neutron itself. He also initiated the first neutron diffraction investigations of magnetic materials. ... "If there is a ... 'Father of Neutron Scattering' in the United States, it is Professor Shull," wrote Anthony Nunes ..., professor of physics at the University of Rhode Island. ...

Professor Shull came to MIT as a full professor in 1955 and retired in 1986, though he continued to visit and to "look over the shoulders" of students doing experiments in the "remnants of my old research laboratory."

Professor Shull's awards include the Buckley Prize, which he received from the American Physical Society in 1956, and election to the American Academy of Arts and Sciences (1956) and to the National Academy of Sciences (1975). In 1993 he received the Royal Swedish Academy of Sciences' Gregori Aminoff prize for his "development and application of neutron diffraction methods for studies of atomic and magnetic structures of solids."' ^{[1]}

== Honors ==
=== Shull's Personal Awards, Honors and Prizes ===
- Awarded the Oliver E. Buckley Prize, American Physical Society, 1956
- Elected to the American Academy of Arts and Sciences, 1956
- Elected to the National Academy of Sciences, 1975
- Awarded the Gregori Aminoff Prize, Royal Swedish Academy of Sciences, 1993
- Awarded the Nobel Prize in Physics, 1994, which he shared with Canadian physicist Bertram Brockhouse.
- Shull Rocks, in Antarctica named in his honor

=== Press Releases Honoring Shull ===
- Carroll, Cindy. "Carnegie Mellon University Receives Nobel Laureate Clifford Shull Papers Grant and Additional Gift Will Make the Collection Available to Researchers", (Mar. 12, 2004): Carnegie Mellon University.
- Stevenson, Daniel C. "Shull wins Physics Nobel for work done 40 years ago", The Tech-Online Edition. Vol. 114, no. 68, Feb. 7, 1995: Massachusetts Institute of Technology (MIT).
- "Oak Ridge Pays Tribute to its Nobel Prize Winner", Oak Ridge National Laboratory.

=== Prizes in Honor of Shull ===
- The Clifford G. Shull Prize in Neutron Physics, The Neutron Scattering Society of America.
- Clifford G. Shull Fellowship, Oak Ridge National Laboratory.

== Publications ==
- Shull, C.G., Wollan, E.O. & M.C. Marney. "Neutron Diffraction Studies", Oak Ridge National Laboratory (ORNL), United States Department of Energy (through predecessor agency the Atomic Energy Commission), (Oct. 22, 1948).
- Rundle, R.E., Shull, C.G. & E.O. Wollan. "The Crystal Structure of Thorium and Zirconium Dihydrides by X-ray and Neutron Diffraction", Ames Laboratory, Oak Ridge National Laboratory (ORNL), United States Department of Energy (through predecessor agency the Atomic Energy Commission), (Apr. 20, 1951).
- Nathans, R., Riste, T., Shirane, G. & C.G. Shull. "Polarized Neutron Studies on Antiferromagnetic Single Crystals: Technical Report No. 4", Massachusetts Institute of Technology (MIT), Brookhaven National Laboratory, United States Department of Energy (through predecessor agency the Atomic Energy Commission), National Security Agency (NSA), Air Force Office of Scientific Research (AFOSR), (Nov. 26, 1958).
- Shull, C.G. "Low Temperature and Neutron Physics Studies: Final Progress Report, March 1, 1986--May 31, 1987", Massachusetts Institute of Technology (MIT), United States Department of Energy, (July 27, 1989).
