= Crystal Sound =

Sound in Graham Land, Antarctica

Crystal Sound (Antarctic Peninsula)

Crystal Sound (66°23′S 66°30′W) is a sound in Antarctica between the southern part of the Biscoe Islands and the coast of Graham Land, with northern limit Cape Evensen to Cape Leblond and southern limit Holdfast Point, Roux Island, Liard Island and the Sillard Islands. It was so named by the UK Antarctic Place-Names Committee in 1960 because many features in the sound are named for men who have undertaken research on the structure of ice crystals. To the north of Crystal Sound, many geographical features are named after physiologists.

== Geographic features in Crystal Sound ==
- Bragg Islands
- Shull Rocks
- Pauling Islands
- Bernal Islands
- Levy Island
- Wollan Island
- Davidson Island
- Matsuyama Rocks
- Fowler Islands
- Dennison Reef
- Nakaya Islands
- Owston Islands
- Kidd Islands
- McConnel Islands
- Stefan Ice Piedmont
