= Bragg Islands =

- Location within Antarctica Location within Antarctic Peninsula

Geography
- Location: Antarctica
- Coordinates: 66°28′S 66°26′W

Administration
- Administered under the Antarctic Treaty System

Demographics
- Population: Uninhabited

The Bragg Islands are a small group of islands in Crystal Sound, about 13 km (7 nmi) north of Cape Rey, Graham Land. They were mapped from surveys by the Falkland Islands Dependencies Survey (1958–59) and from air photos obtained by the Ronne Antarctic Research Expedition (1947–48). The group was named by the UK Antarctic Place-Names Committee for Sir William H. Bragg, an English physicist who interpreted X-ray measurements to give the location of oxygen atoms in the structure of ice.

== See also ==
- List of Antarctic and sub-Antarctic islands
