= Cape Rey =

Cape Rey (66°36′S 66°27′W) is a dark, rocky cape located between the southwest side of Darbel Bay and the northeast side of Lallemand Fjord, on the west coast of Graham Land. It was discovered during the French Antarctic Expedition from 1908 to 1910, under Charcot, and named by him in honour of Lieutenant Joseph J. Rey, of the French Navy, who served as a meteorologist during the French Antarctic Expedition under Charcot, 1903 to 1905.
