= Carolyn Parker =

American physicist

Carolyn Beatrice Parker
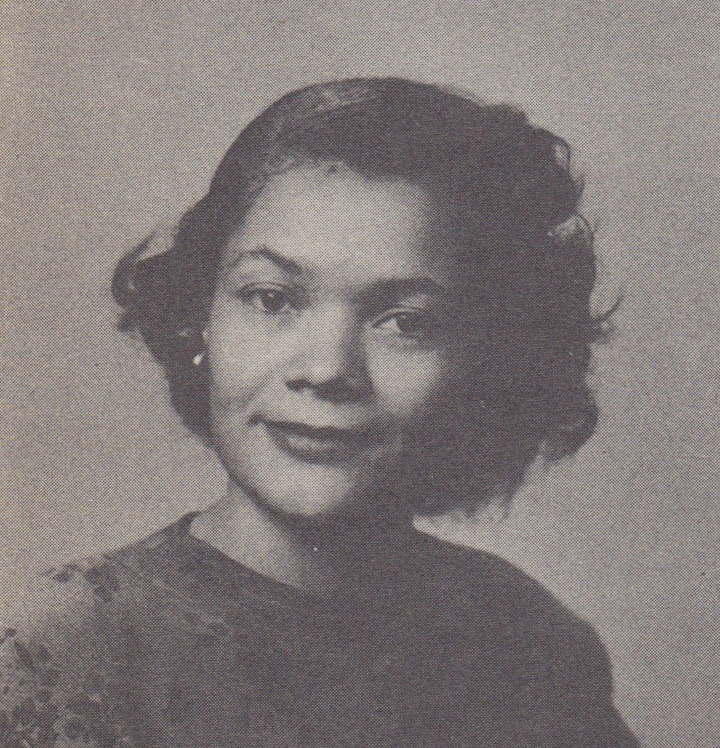
- Born: November 18, 1917; Gainesville, Florida, U.S.
- Died: March 17, 1966 (aged 48); Gainesville, Florida, U.S.
- Education: Fisk University; University of Michigan; Ohio State University; MIT
- Known for: Dayton Project; First African-American woman known to gain postgraduate degree in physics
- Scientific career
- Fields: Mathematics; Physics
- Workplaces: Bluefield State College; Wright-Patterson Air Force Base; Fisk University

Carolyn Beatrice Parker (November 18, 1917 – March 17, 1966) was a research physicist and educator whose scientific contributions helped expand our understandings of physics and aircraft radio technologies during WWII. After obtaining her undergraduate degree at Fisk University, in 1938, Parker taught at public schools in Florida before attending the University of Michigan to earn a M.A. in physics in 1941. From 1943 to 1947, Parker contributed to the war effort by working in the Aircraft Radio Laboratory and subsequently returned to Fisk University as an assistant professor. In 1949, Parker enrolled as a doctoral student at MIT but switched to a masters program. She graduated with her M.S. in physics in 1951. She died at the age of 48, in 1966. Today, Parker is celebrated in biographical dictionaries, various blogs, newspapers, and social media post for being the first African-American woman known to have obtained a postgraduate degree in physics. Also, there are scholarships and facilities named in her honor such as Carolyn Beatrice Parker Elementary School and Carolyn Beatrice Parker Park in Gainesville, Florida.

== Early life ==
Carolyn Beatrice Parker was born in Gainesville, Florida, on November 18, 1917, to Delia Ella Murrell Parker and Julius Augustus Parker. Her mother had trained and worked as an elementary school teacher. Her father served the African American community as a physician and pharmacist. Dr. Parker obtained his degrees from Fisk University and Meharry Medical College, an historically Black medical school established to train African-Americans. Parker grew up in a two-story family home (inherited from her grandfather who also worked as a physician) with her grandmother (Eliza Parker), parents and siblings. Parker was the eldest of seven children, Mary Parker Miller, Juanita Parker Wynter, Martha Parker, Gloria Parker, Julia Leslie Parker-Crosby, and Julius Augustus Parker Jr.

In 1925, Carolyn and her family relocated to Tampa, Florida but her grandmother stayed behind in Gainesville, Florida. In Tampa, her father continued to practice medicine while her mother attended classes at Dayton Cookman Collegiate Institute (now Bethune-Cookman University) to prepare to re-enter the workforce as a teacher. In 1930, Dr. Parker had to return to Gainesville to take care of his ailing mother. According to an oral history of Julia Leslie Parker-Crosby, their father's absence may have led to their sister, Gloria, dying of appendicitis in 1933 because he was unable to treat her. However, the family tragedy led to the family relocating back to Gainesville, Florida after Carolyn graduated from Middleton High School.

== Education ==
Parker follow family tradition and enrolled at Fisk University in 1934. Fisk University had just began teaching physics courses under the direction of Elmer Imes and would graduate their first physics major in 1935, James Raymon Lawson. Carolyn took advantage of the opportunity to study physics and graduated magna cum laude with a Bachelor of Arts degree in 1938. During this time, she joined Sigma Upsilon Pi, a university honor society and Delta Sigma Theta. Later in 1941, she obtained a Master of Arts in physics from the University of Michigan in 1941. During her time as a research physicist in the Aircraft Radio Laboratory at Wright Field in Dayton, Ohio. She took courses in electrical engineering and physics in Ohio State University's Graduate Center at Wright Field, a joint program between the US Army Air Forces and the university. In 1951, Parker enrolled in the Massachusetts Institute of Technology (MIT) and graduated with a Master of Science in physics in 1953, under the supervision of David H. Frisch. Her master's thesis titled "Range distribution of 122 Mev (pi⁺) and (pi⁻) mesons in brass," compared computational data with data taken from the synchrocyclotron of the University of Chicago.

== Career ==
Parker began her career, in 1938, as an educator in Florida's segregated public school system. As documented in the Black Teacher Archives and by other historians, African American teachers worked in segregated schools but had their own professional organizations and infrastructures for supporting their student's success. During her first year, she worked at Rochelle elementary school were her mother also worked and then joined the faculty at Lincoln High School in 1939. At the time, Lincoln was one of two accredited high schools for African American students in Florida. After a year, Carolyn left Lincoln to further her education.

After graduating with a M.A in physics, Carolyn returned to education, this time at Huntington High School in Newport News, Virginia and Bluefield State College (now Bluefield State University) a historically black college in West Virginia. As a part of the movement to bring progressive education to Black schools, Huntington High School's curriculum focused on democracy and student growth. Parker aided in this schools mission by teaching eight grade and coaching girls' basketball. After one academic year, she began teaching on the collegiate level in West Virginia. However, her time at Bluefield State was short lived as she joined the war effort in March 1943.

Like other African Americans scientists aided in the war effort, Carolyn left education to exercise her citizenship and take advantage of the opportunities to work as a scientific researcher. Carolyn was assigned to the radio and radar subdivision of the engineering division located in the Aircraft Radio Laboratory at Wright Field. She worked with Chandler Stewart Jr. an electrical engineer and Army corps member. Their project focused on improving the testing procedures for radio antenna, specifically coaxial cables, on the airplanes to ensure the sound quality was clear, with limited noise, and interference. Carolyn co-authored a paper with Stewart entitled: A method of measuring attenuation of short lengths coaxial cable. Stewart published a series of subsequent publications based on their work in the Journal of Applied Physics and Proceedings of the Institute of Radio Engineers. The publications are: A method of measuring attenuation of short lengths coaxial cable, A method of measuring the radio frequency resistance of wires, and Electrical testing of coaxial radio-frequency cable connectors. Stewart also applied and received a patent for their work (US Patent No. 2,459,197). The exact reason why Carolyn did not co-author these subsequent publications or patent remains unknown but may be a result of race and gender politics in the United States. However, Parker also became a member of Institute of Radio Engineers and joined a grass root organization, the Cosmopolitan Research Center during her time at Wright Field.

In 1947, Carolyn returned to her alma mater, Fisk University, as an assistant professor of physics. James Raymond Lawson served as the department chair and was working on building their graduate program in infrared spectroscopy. However, in 1950, Lawson joined the faculty at Tennessee State University and Nelson Fuson replaced him as the department chair. By 1951, the physics department had four full time faculty members and a research program in infrared spectroscopy. Carolyn and another faculty member taught most of the undergraduate courses while the other faculty focused on the graduate program. During her time at Fisk, she also joined the American Physical Society.

In 1951, Carolyn left to continue her education and receive additional training in physics. The lab she joined focused on experimental particle physics in hopes of understandings nuclear binding energies and high-energy accelerators. Carolyn's research built on the meson theory of nuclear forces which argued that mesons mediate interactions between nucleons. Her work specifically focused on positive and negative pions also known as pi-mesons. Alongside her thesis project, she joined Sigma Xi and worked as a physicist in the geophysics research division at the Air Force Cambridge Research Center in Cambridge, Massachusetts.

From 1953, Carolyn worked as a laboratory technician in Boston, Massachusetts and lived at the Franklin Square House for working women. More research needs to be done to recover her story between 1953 and 1966.

== Personal life ==
Carolyn came from a family that valued education. For example, all of her siblings attended college. Mary Louise Parker Miller, graduated from Talladega College with a BA in mathematics, briefly attended University of Michigan and then obtained a MS in mathematics from New York University. Juanita Parker Wynter graduated with a BS in mathematics from Saint Augustine College (now Saint Augustine University) and then obtained a MS in Counseling from New York University. Martha Parker Anderson graduated with a BS in Social Science from Tennessee Agricultural and Industrial State College (now Tennessee State University) and then obtained a MS in sociology from Temple University. Julia Leslie Parker-Cosby graduated with a BS in chemistry from Fisk University and then obtained a MS in Medical Technology from Meharry Medical College. Parker's only brother, Julius Augustus Parker Jr., graduated with a BA in chemistry from Fisk University and briefly attended the University of Michigan. Carolyn's maternal first cousin Joan Murrell Owens, a marine biologist, was one of the first African-American women to receive a PhD in geology.

According to family recollections, Parker became sick during graduate school and died from leukemia which inhibited her from obtaining her Ph.D. She also never married and had no children.

== Legacy ==
For many years, it was believed that Carolyn worked on the Dayton Project. The Dayton Project was part of the Manhattan Project to develop atomic weapons in World War II, and continuing into the Cold War. Parker's connections to the Dayton Project can be traced back to a phone interview with her sister, Juanita Parker Wynter, where she stated that Carolyn's work was "so secret she couldn't discuss it, even with us, her family." However, recently her scientific contributions to radio communications have recovered which has provided historians of science with new perspectives on her life and legacy.

In 2020, during the international Black Lives Matter protests sparked by the murders of George Floyd and Ahmaud Arbery, and the shooting of Breonna Taylor, an elementary school and neighboring park in Gainesville that had been named after Confederate brigadier general Jesse Johnson Finley were renamed in her honor. The Fermi National Accelerator Laboratory, located in Batavia, Illinois established the Carolyn B. Parker Fellowship for the Superconducting Quantum Materials and System Center.

In 2025, during the International Year of Quantum Physics, an award-winning essay was written to honor her legacy and draw connections to other African American physicists that came after her.

== Further information ==
- Carolyn Beatrice Parker is listed in: Gates LH Jr, Burkett NH, Burkett RK. Black biographical dictionaries, 1790–1950 [microform].
- Google Scholar records an incomplete citation to this study: Parker, Carolyn Beatrice. Range Distribution of 122 Mev (pi) and (pi−) Mesons in Brass. 1953.
