= Joan Murrell Owens =

American marine biologist

- Born: June 30, 1933; Miami, Florida, U.S.
- Died: May 25, 2011 (aged 77); Washington, D.C., U.S.
- Education: Fisk University; University of Michigan; George Washington University
- Known for: Marine Biology; Corals
- Scientific career
- Fields: Biology
- Workplaces: Howard University
- Thesis: Microstructural changes in the Scleractinian families Micrabaciidae and Fungiidae and their taxonomic and ecologic implications
- Doctoral advisor: Anthony George (A. G.) Coates

Joan Murrell Owens (June 30, 1933 – May 25, 2011) was an American educator and marine biologist specializing in deep-sea corals. She received degrees in Geology, Fine Art, and Guidance Counseling. She described a new genus, Rhombopsammia, and three new species of button corals, R. niphada, R. squiresi, and Letepsammia franki.

== Education ==
With the support of her parents, Owens became interested in the life of the oceans at young age. In 1950 Owens graduated from Miami's Booker T. Washington High School. She was awarded two scholarships, one from the Pepsi-Cola Company and a Sarah Maloney (Art Scholarship) at Fisk University. She later entered Fisk University but the university did not offer a program in the marine sciences. Thus in 1954 she majored in fine art and received her BFA degree with minors mathematics and psychology.

For graduate study, Owens entered the University of Michigan with the intention to study commercial art. In 1956 she switched to pursue and later receive a Master of Science degree in guidance counseling with an emphasis on reading therapy. After that, she returned to Washington D.C. to pursue marine biology, with support from her companion Philip Morrison, she entered George Washington University in 1970. George Washington University did not have an undergraduate program in marine science. Thus, she majored in geology and a minor in zoology. She received her B.S. in geology in 1973 and her M.S. in 1976.

== Research ==
Continuing work toward her doctorate, she returned to Howard University in Washington D.C. as a professor of geology in 1976. Owens had sickle cell anemia traits, making research limited by her inability to scuba dive for specimens. Instead, she conducted a laboratory project at the Smithsonian Institution using coral samples collected by the USS Albatross (1882) expeditions. Her doctoral research investigated deep-sea button corals. Her dissertation was titled "Microstructural Changes in the Scleractinian Families Micrabaciidae and Fungiidae and their Taxonomic and Ecologic Implications." Owens said she was drawn to the subject matter because she found it exciting to see how nature works. “I knew I wanted to do coral study,” she said in an interview with New Directions journal. “I learned of the strange case of this little thing starting in shallow water and the changes in the family as it migrated into deeper water. So I thought, ‘Here’s an interesting group that few people have been working on.’" She received her PhD from George Washington University in 1984.

She continued her laboratory work at the Smithsonian to classify and study button corals. She began advancing to the rank of associate professor in the department of Geology and Geography at Howard University in 1986. She described the new genus of button coral Rhombopsammia and three coral species in 1986. In 1994, she added a new species to the genus Letepsammia, naming L. franki for her husband, Frank A. Owens. Both genera are in the family Micrabaciidae.

In a 1989 interview, Owens described how she understood the meaning and impact of her work,

“As a scientist, I tend to think all knowledge is important—even for the sake of knowledge,” Owens observes. “Many people don’t look at it that way. You ask me the question, ‘What is this research on deep water solitary corals good for?’ Well, it’s not going to make anybody rich; it’s not going to be a cure for cancer; it’s not going to lead to anything like that. But it’s knowledge. It’s information. It’s information, in particular, that provides insights into our ‘last frontier,’ the Earth’s oceans. I don’t think you should ever turn your back on extending man’s understanding of his world. You can’t foresee where that knowledge might lead. The more man knows, maybe the better he’ll behave in terms of preserving his world, and the more he might see an analogy that he can use for himself.”

== Teaching ==
Owens taught for two years at the University of Michigan's Children's Psychiatric Hospital. She later joined the faculty of Howard University in Washington, D.C. in 1957, there she specialized in teaching remedial English. During the 1960s, she moved to Newton, Massachusetts and designed programs for teaching English to educationally disadvantaged students at the Institute for Services to Education. Later, this work influenced the Upward Bound program of the United States Department of Education.

Joan Owens transferred to the biology department of Howard in 1992 when the department of geology and geography was phased out, and retired from full-time work in 1995.

== Life and Family ==
Joan M. Owens was born on June 30th, 1933, in Miami, Florida, to William and Leola Murrell. She was the youngest of their three daughters. In the 1960s Murrell married Frank A. Owens.

Joan Owens died on May 25, 2011. She was survived by her sister, Willette M. Carlton; two daughters, Adrienne Lewis and Angela Owens; and a granddaughter, Chara Johnson.

== Hobbies and Interests ==
With the support of her parents, Owens became interested in the life of the oceans at young age. She aspired to study marine biology professionally, her interest likely spurred from family fishing trips. One of her favorite books was The Silent World by Jacques Cousteau.

== Selected publications ==
- Owens, Joan Murrell (4 June 1986). "Rhombopsammia, a New Genus of the Family Micrabaciidae (Coelenterata: Scleractinia)". Proceedings of the Biological Society of Washington. 99 (2): 248–256.
- Owens, Joan Murrell (17 October 1986). "On the Elevation of the Stephanophyllia Subgenus Letepsammia to Generic Rank (Coelenterata: Scleractinia: Micrabaciidae)". Proceedings of the Biological Society of Washington. 99 (3): 486–488.
- Owens, Joan Murrell (30 December 1994). "Letepsammia franki, a New Species of Deep-Sea Coral (Coelenterata: Scleractinia: Micrabaciidae)". Proceedings of the Biological Society of Washington. 107 (4): 586–590.
