= Button coral =

Button coral may refer to several different taxa:

- Cynarina lacrymalis, a species of coral
- Gymnophyllum wardi, an extinct species of coral
- either species of the genus Rhombopsammia
