= Otto Laporte =

German-born American physicist (1902–1971)

- Born: July 23, 1902; Mainz, German Empire
- Died: March 28, 1971 (aged 68); Ann Arbor, Michigan, United States
- Citizenship: Germany; United States
- Education: University of Frankfurt am Main
- Known for: Laporte rule
- Scientific career
- Fields: Physics
- Workplaces: University of Michigan
- Doctoral advisor: Arnold Sommerfeld

Otto Laporte (July 23, 1902 – March 28, 1971) was a German-born American physicist and professor at the University of Michigan, who made contributions to quantum mechanics, electromagnetic wave propagation theory, spectroscopy, and fluid dynamics. His name is lent to the Laporte rule in spectroscopy and to the Otto Laporte Award of the American Physical Society.

== Education ==
Laporte’s ancestors came from French Huguenot families who fled to Switzerland in the 17th century. His father was an officer in the military. Before World War I, they were stationed in the fortified cities of Mainz (where Laporte was born), Cologne, and Metz, in which he received his early education. After the war started, they returned to Mainz.

In the spring of 1920, the family moved to Frankfurt, staying just one year, where Laporte attended the University of Frankfurt am Main. There, he was influenced by the mathematicians Arthur Schoenflies, Ludwig Bieberbach, and Ernst Hellinger, and the physicists Max Born, and Alfred Landé. In the summer of 1921, the Laporte family moved to Munich, where Laporte became a student of Arnold Sommerfeld at the Ludwig-Maximilians-Universität München. Max Born had sent an enthusiastic recommendation of Laporte to Sommerfeld. At that time, Wolfgang Pauli was an assistant to Sommerfeld and Sommerfeld’s students included Werner Heisenberg, Gregor Wentzel, Karl Herzfeld, and Paul Peter Ewald – all of whom would go on to become famous physicists in their own right. Laporte’s first independent research was on the diffraction of electromagnetic waves around a spherical body and this was the basis for his doctoral thesis under Sommerfeld. His doctorate was granted in 1924. While at LMU, he also analyzed various spectra and made a contribution to understanding atomic structure. Through these research efforts, Laporte and William Frederick Meggers discovered in 1925 what is known in spectroscopy as the Laporte rule, which specifies that electronic transitions which conserve parity are forbidden.

== Life and work ==
When Sommerfeld was a visiting professor in the United States, he learned about the International Education Board fellowships set up through the Rockefeller Foundation. Sommerfeld heartily recommended Laporte for a fellowship, which was granted to him for two years starting in 1924. Laporte used the fellowship to do postdoctoral studies and research at the National Bureau of Standards in Washington, D.C. There, he was influenced by William F. Meggers, Gregory Breit, Merle A. Tuve, Paul D. Foote, F. L. Mohler, Arthur Ruark, and Harold Urey.

After his fellowship, Laporte was invited, in 1926, to the University of Michigan by Harrison M. Randall, chairman of the physics department. Laporte served as an instructor for one year and then was promoted to assistant professor. It was the intention of Randall to build up the theoretical physics capabilities at Michigan, so in 1927 Laporte was joined by George Eugene Uhlenbeck, Samuel Abraham Goudsmit, and David M. Dennison, who remained at Michigan for many years.

In 1928, Laporte was invited as a guest lecturer at Kyoto Imperial University. While in Japan, he got an urgent message from Sommerfeld, who was going to the United States and wanted Laporte to lecture in his place at the Ludwig-Maximilians-Universität München. Laporte had to cut his visit short and make a two-week, non-stop trip via the Trans-Siberian Railway in order to arrive in Munich in time. His next visits to Japan were as a lecturer at the University of Tokyo, on leave from Michigan, in 1933 and 1937; during these periods, he learned to speak Japanese and understand their culture. In between these visits, in 1935, he became a naturalized citizen of the United States. From 1954 to 1955, and again from 1961 to 1963, he was a scientific advisor to the American Ambassador in Tokyo. His activities resulted in a landmark atomic energy agreement between the United States and Japan, and he was cited by the U.S. State Department for his key contributions. Between his foreign services in Japan, he served the United States in Germany. From 1949 to 1950, Laporte was an intelligence analyst for the U.S. Army of Occupation in Heidelberg.

It was in 1944 that Laporte added a new area to his professional activities – fluid dynamics, which includes the sub-field of hydrodynamics. That year, he published a paper giving an exact solution to the problem of the lift of an airfoil of elliptical outline. Two years later, he conducted experiments in fluid dynamics with an advanced design shock tube facility put together under Lincoln Smith at Michigan. When Smith left in 1946, Laporte took over the facility. The shock tube allowed him to make spectroscopic measurements in new regions through the shock heating of gases. The addition of fluid dynamics to his research activities was in reality a convergence of a number of his professional interests in quantum mechanics and spectroscopy. And his time at LMU influenced this, as Sommerfeld had done work in hydrodynamics and Heisenberg’s doctoral thesis was on hydrodynamics. Laporte was one of the charter members of the American Physical Society’s Division of Fluid Dynamics, and he served as the division's chairman in 1965.

Laporte had a number of hobbies, which included playing the piano and horticulture, specializing in plants of the cactus and the euphorbia families.

Otto Laporte died in 1971 in Ann Arbor, Michigan of stomach cancer leaving Adele Laporte (wife) and daughters Claire Laporte, Irene Laporte (now Irene Plenefisch) and Marianne Laporte.

== Honors ==
- 1971 – First person posthumously elected to the National Academy of Sciences
- 1972 – American Physical Society, Division of Fluid Dynamics, established the Otto Laporte Memorial Lectureship (which in 1985 was changed into the Otto Laporte Award)

== Books ==
- Otto Laporte Theorie der Multiplettspektren Offprint from Walter Grotrian et al., Grundlagen der Astrophysik Vol. 3, Part 2 (Springer, 1930)
- Otto Laporte and R. C. F. Bartels An Investigation of the Exact Solution of the Linearized Equations for the Flow Past Conical Bodies (Michigan University Ann Arbor Office of Research Administration, 1948)
- Arnold Sommerfeld, translated from the first German edition by Otto Laporte and Peter A. Moldauer Optics - Lectures on Theoretical Physics Volume IV (Academic Press, 1964) [German title and publisher: Arnold Sommerfeld Optik - Vorlesungen über theoretische Physik Band 4 (Dieterich'sche Verlagsbuchhandlung, 1950)]

== Selected literature ==
- Otto Laporte Zur Theorie der Ausbreitung elektromagnetischer Wellen auf der Erdkugel, Annalen der Physik, 375 (8) 595-616 (1923).
- J. E. Mack, Otto Laporte, and R. J. Lang The Application of the X-Ray Laws to Optical Spectra of Higher Rank, and the Classification of Ga IV and Ge V, Phys. Rev. 31 (5) 748 - 772 (1928). Mack and Laporte are cited as being at the University of Michigan. Lang is cited as being at the University of Alberta, Edmonton, Canada. Article received February 1928.
- O. Laporte and D. R. Inglis Resonance Separations in Configurations of type p5s and d9s, Phys. Rev. 35 (11) 1337 - 1341 (1930). The authors are cited as being at the department of physics, University of Michigan. Article received April 21, 1930.
- Otto Laporte and George E. Uhlenbeck Application of Spinor Analysis to the Maxwell and Dirac Equations, Phys. Rev. 37 (11) 1380 - 1397 (1931). The author is cited as being at the department of physics, University of Michigan. Article received February 24, 1931.
- Otto Laporte, George R. Miller, and Ralph A. Sawyer The First Spark Spectrum of Rubidium (Rb II), Phys. Rev. 38 (5) 843 - 853 (1931). The authors are cited as being at the University of Michigan. Article received July 23, 1931.
- O. Laporte, G. R. Miller, and R. A. Sawyer The First Spark Spectrum of Caesium (Cs II) Phys. Rev. 39 (3) 458 - 466 (1932). The authors are cited as being at the University of Michigan. Article received December 17, 1931.
- Otto Laporte Absorption Coefficients for Thermal Neutrons. Remarks on the Preceding Paper of C. T. Zahn, Phys. Rev. 52 (2) 72 - 74 (1937). The author is cited as being at the University of Michigan, Ann Arbor, Michigan. Article received April 7, 1937.
- W. R. Johnson and Otto Laporte Interaction of Cylindrical Sound Waves with a Stationary Shock Wave, Physics of Fluids 1 (2) 82-94 (1958). The author is cites as being at the University of Michigan, Ann Arbor, Michigan. Article received February 12, 1958.
- Tien Sun Chang and Otto Laporte Reflection of Strong Blast Waves, Physics of Fluids 7 (8) 1225-1232 (1964). Chang is cited as being at the Virginia Polytechnic Institute, Blacksburg, Virginia. Laporte is cited as being at the University of Michigan, Ann Arbor, Michigan.
- O. Laporte and R. G. Fowler Resistance of a Plasma Slab between Juxtaposed Disk Electrodes, Phys. Rev. 148 (1) 170 - 175 (1966). Laporte is cited as being at the University of Michigan, Ann Arbor, Michigan. Fowler is cited as being at the University of Oklahoma, Norman, Oklahoma. Article received March 9, 1966.
- Otto Laporte On Kepler Ellipses Starting from a Point in Space, American Journal of Physics 38 (7) 837-840 (1970). The author is cited as being at the University of Michigan, Ann Arbor, Michigan 48104. Article received November 18, 1969.
