= Sterling Howard Emerson =

American geneticist

- Born: 29 October 1900; Lincoln, Nebraska, USA
- Died: 2 May 1988 (aged 87); Altadena, Los Angeles County, California, USA
- Education: University of Michigan (PhD); Cornell University (BS)
- Spouse: Mary Foote Randall
- Children: Ann K Fincham, S Jonathan Emerson
- Parents: Rollins Adams Emerson (father); Harriet Hardin (mother)
- Relatives: Harrison M. Randall (father-in-law); John Fincham (son-in-law)
- Scientific career
- Fields: Genetics
- Workplaces: California Institute of Technology
- Author abbrev. (botany): S.Emers.

Sterling Howard Emerson was an American geneticist. Emerson was awarded a Guggenheim Fellowship in 1951.

== Life ==
Sterling Howard Emerson was born on October 29, 1900 in Lincoln, Nebraska, the son of Rollins Adams Emerson and Harriet Hardin. Emerson was awarded a Bachelor of Science degree from Cornell University in 1922, and admitted as a Doctor of Philosophy from the University of Michigan in 1928. Emerson was the professor of genetics at the California Institute of Technology from 1928 to 1971. Emerson died on May 2, 1988, in Altadena, California.

Sterling Howard Emerson married Mary Foote Randall (daughter of physicist Harrison M. Randall and Ida May Muma) on 29 May 1924 in Ann Arbor, Michigan. Their children were Ann K Emerson (married geneticist John Fincham) and S Jonathan Emerson.
