= Ralph A. Sawyer =

American physicist

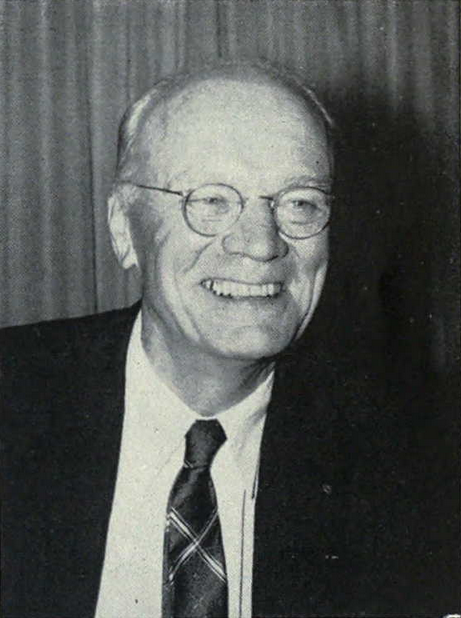
- Sawyer from the 1961 Michiganensian
- Born: January 5, 1895; New Hampshire, U.S.
- Died: December 6, 1978 (aged 83); Ann Arbor, Michigan, U.S.
- Education: Dartmouth
- Known for: Scientific and academic leadership
- Awards: Ives Medal, Compton Medal
- Scientific career
- Fields: Physics
- Workplaces: University of Michigan
- Doctoral advisor: R. A. Millikan

Ralph Alanson Sawyer (January 5, 1895 – December 6, 1978) was an American physicist and a leader in American science.

A New Hampshire native, he graduated from the Atkinson Academy in 1911 and in 1915 from Dartmouth. He then went to the University of Chicago where, under the direction of R. A. Millikan, he finished his PhD in 1919, a time during which he also served as a scientific liaison officer in the United States Navy. At the invitation of Harrison M. Randall, Sawyer then joined the faculty of the physics department at the University of Michigan, an affiliation that he retained for his entire career.

At Michigan, he began by doing work in ultraviolet spectroscopy for studies of atomic structure; he also did much to develop industrial applications of spectroscopy. In later years, his talent for administration brought him to positions of scientific, military, and academic leadership that extended beyond his formal retirement from Michigan in 1964.

Sawyer was the civilian director of the 1946 Bikini atomic bomb tests, president of the Optical Society of America from 1955 to 1957, elected Fellow of OSA in 1959, and was awarded the Frederic Ives Medal in 1963. He was also dean of the graduate school and vice president for research at the University of Michigan.

Sawyer died in 1978, at 83 years of age, in Ann Arbor, Michigan.

== See also ==
- Optical Society of America#Past Presidents of the OSA
