= David M. Dennison =

American physicist (1900–1976)

David Mathias Dennison
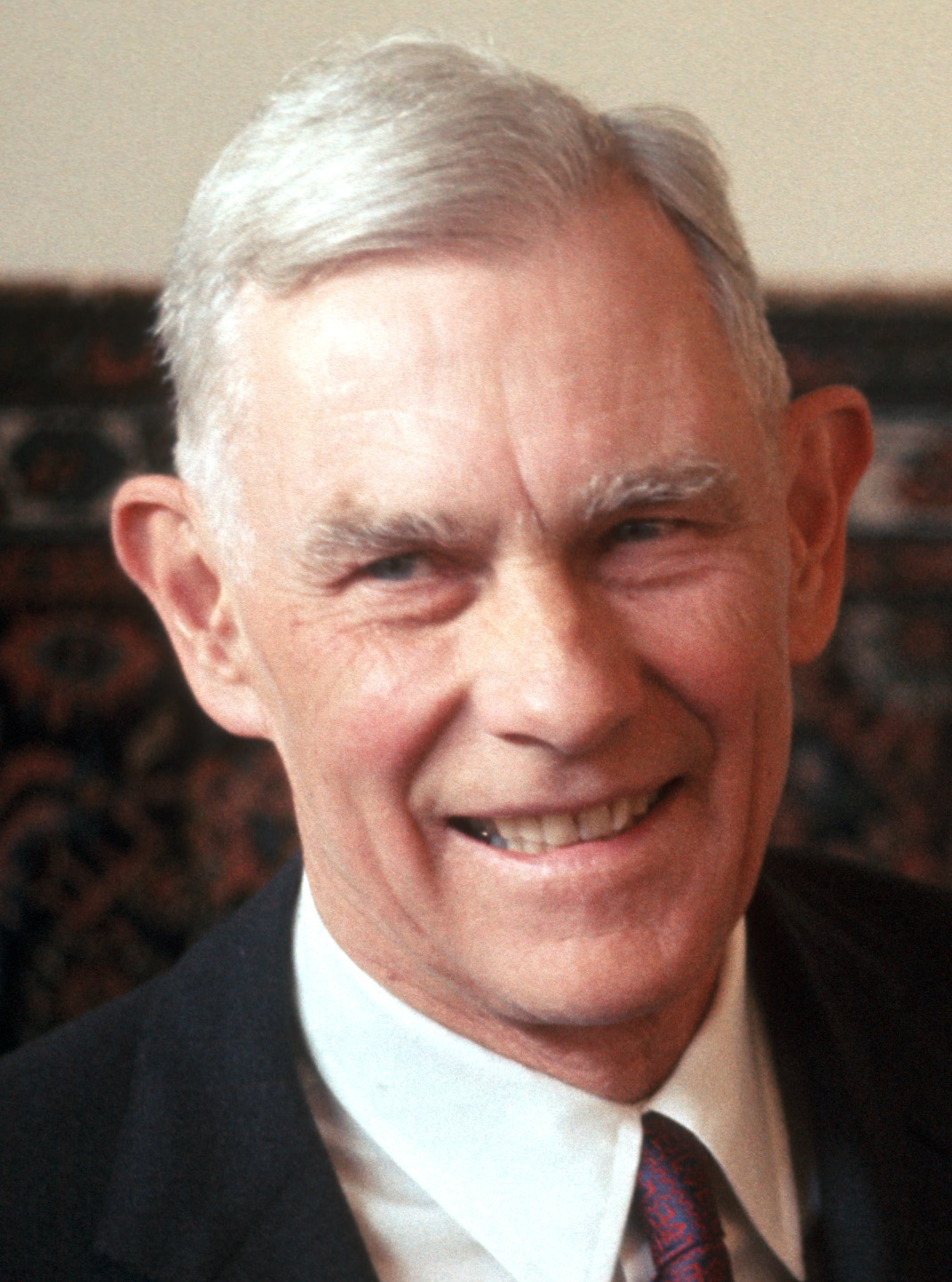
- Dennison at his home in Ann Arbor, Michigan, 1969
- Born: 26 April 1900; Oberlin, Ohio
- Died: 3 April 1976 (aged 75)
- Education: Swarthmore College; University of Michigan
- Spouse: Helen Lenette Johnson
- Scientific career
- Doctoral advisor: Walter F. Colby; Oskar Klein
- Notable students: Nelson Fuson; Ku Zing-whai

David Mathias Dennison (April 26, 1900 in Oberlin, Ohio – April 3, 1976) was an American physicist who made contributions to quantum mechanics, spectroscopy, and the physics of molecular structure.

== Education ==
In 1917, Dennison entered Swarthmore College, where he graduated in 1921. He then went to the University of Michigan, in Ann Arbor, for graduate studies in physics with Walter F. Colby and Oskar Klein. Klein, already associated with the Kaluza–Klein theory (1921), joined the faculty at Michigan in 1922, after a six-year stay at the Institute for Theoretical Physics, under Niels Bohr, at the University of Copenhagen. It was through Klein that Dennison heard and leaned much about the current theoretical physics being developed in Europe, which created a yearning in him to go to Copenhagen for further study. Dennison's thesis was on the molecular structure and infrared spectrum of the methane molecule, and he was awarded his doctorate in 1924.

From 1924 to 1926, Dennison had an International Education Board (IEB) Fellowship to do postgraduate study and research in Europe. By the end of that time, Harrison McAllister Randall, chairman of physics department at the University of Michigan, had arranged for Dennison to stay in Europe another year on a University of Michigan fellowship. Dennison arrived at the Institute of Theoretical Physics at the University of Copenhagen, in October 1924. During his three years in Europe, he mostly did postdoctoral research in Copenhagen, where he had associations with other visiting physicists working there, such as Paul Dirac, Samuel Abraham Goudsmit, Werner Heisenberg, Walter Heitler, Ralph H. Fowler, Friedrich Hund, Hendrik Anthony Kramers, Yoshio Nishina, Wolfgang Pauli, and George Eugene Uhlenbeck. In the last half of 1925, Heisenberg and Max Born published their matrix mechanics formulation of quantum mechanics. In the fall of 1926 he went to the University of Zurich to study and work with Erwin Schrödinger, who had early in the year published his papers on his wave mechanics formulation of quantum mechanics. In early spring of 1927, Dennison went back to Copenhagen, and in late spring he went to the University of Cambridge to work with Ralph Fowler for six weeks – there at the time were Ernest Rutherford, Nevill Francis Mott, Pyotr Kapitsa, Patrick Blackett, and John Cockcroft. The last few weeks of his fellowship were spent at the University of Leiden with Paul Ehrenfest.

In 1925, George Eugene Uhlenbeck and Samuel Abraham Goudsmit had proposed spin, and Wolfgang Pauli had proposed the Pauli exclusion principle. In 1926, Enrico Fermi and Paul Dirac introduced Fermi–Dirac statistics. While at Cambridge, Dennison used quantum mechanicals calculations on molecular hydrogen to show that protons, like electrons, were subject to Fermi–Dirac statistics, or had spin-½, and therefore obeyed the Pauli exclusion principle.

== Career ==
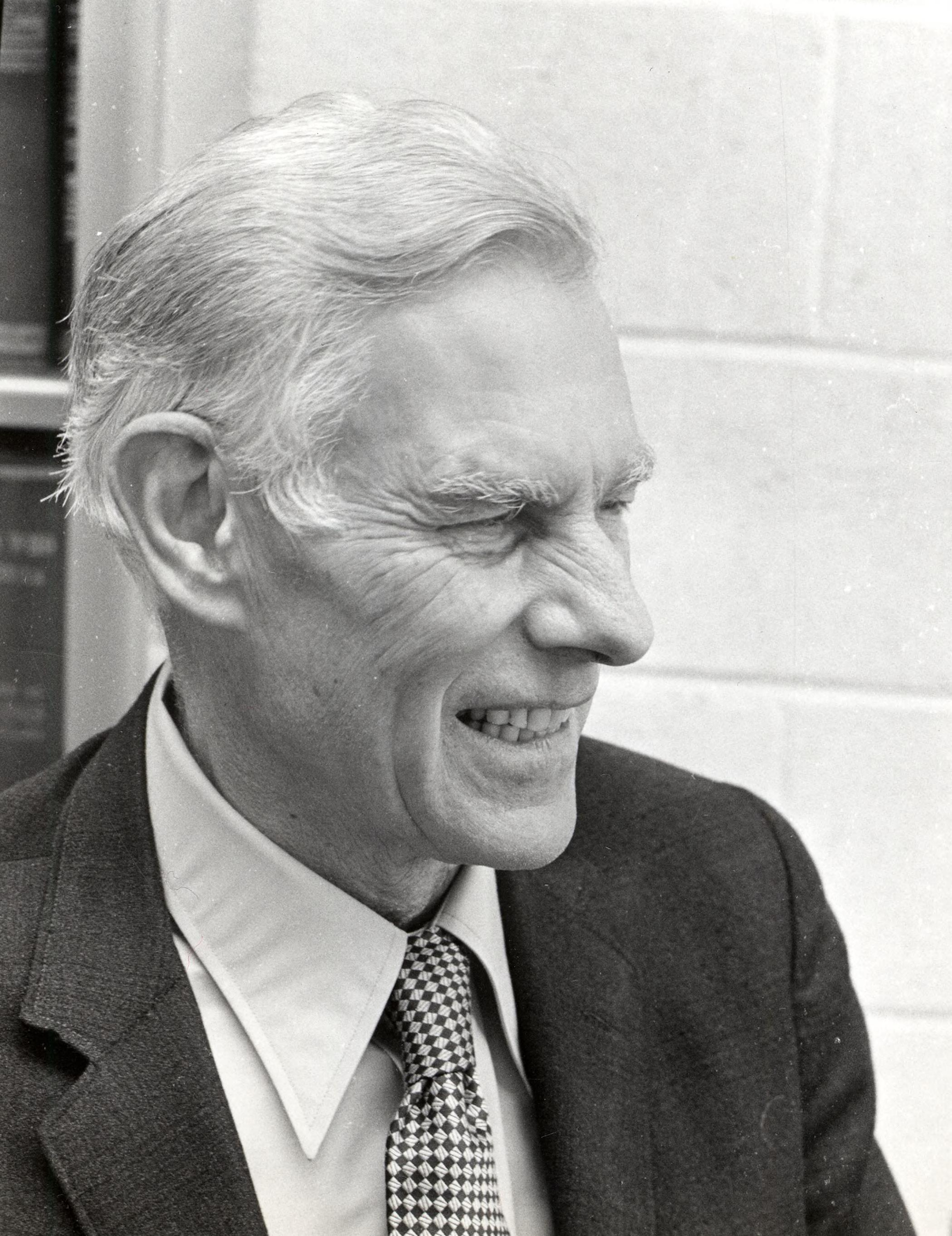
University of Michigan faculty portrait

In 1927, upon Dennison's return from Europe, he started his lifelong career at the University of Michigan until 1976. Otto Laporte had arrived at Michigan in 1926, and George Uhlenbeck and Samuel Goudsmit arrived in 1927. These four men were a team in developing theoretical physics, including quantum mechanics, for many years. They had been brought there by the chairman of the physics department, Harrison McAllister Randall, to build the theoretical capabilities of the department.

Dennison was a student of Niels Bohr, and knew Hans Bethe, Wolfgang Pauli, and Enrico Fermi before they became world-famous. Most of Dennison's work was on molecular structure. Following the discovery of the spin of the electron in 1925 by George Uhlenbeck and Samuel Goudsmit, the specific heat of hydrogen was a major unsolved problems. Dennison solved this problem in 1927 by postulating that the spin of protons does not transition frequently during measurements. This new theory agreed precisely with experiments given that the proton's spin was 1/2. In 1932 Dennison and Uhlenbeck solved the two-minima "reversing umbrella" problem for the position of nitrogen in ammonia. This result predicted absorption at microwave wavelengths, which inspired Neal Williams to build a molecular microwave spectrograph, one of the first ever built. During World War 2 Dennison received a citation from the US Navy for his work with the VT radio proximity fuse. After the war, Dennison returned to work on molecular structure, as well as working on the design of the new synchrotron at Michigan. With Theodore H. Berlin, he developed the theory of stable orbits in a synchrotron with straight sections, a feature that soon became standard in most large synchrotrons.

The David M. Dennison Building on the campus of the University of Michigan was originally named in his honor, but was remodeled and renamed as the Weiser building in 2017 due to a large cash donation from Ron Weiser. The Colloquium Hall of the Department of Physics now bears Dennison's name. Dennison Reef, in Crystal Sound, Antarctica is also named in his honor.

== Personal life ==
David M. Dennison married Helen Lenette Johnson in 1924 and they had two sons.

== Selected Literature ==
- Dennison, David M. (1925). "The Molecular Structure and Infra-Red Spectrum of Methane". The Astrophysical Journal. 62. IOP Publishing: 84. Bibcode:1925ApJ....62...84D. doi:10.1086/142915. hdl:2027/mdp.39015076333155. ISSN 0004-637X.
- Dennison, David M. (1 July 1926). "The Rotation of Molecules". Physical Review. 28 (2). American Physical Society (APS): 318–333. Bibcode:1926PhRv...28..318D. doi:10.1103/physrev.28.318. ISSN 0031-899X.
- Dennison, D. M. (1 June 1927). "A Note on the Specific Heat of the Hydrogen Molecule". Proceedings of the Royal Society A: Mathematical, Physical and Engineering Sciences. 115 (771). The Royal Society: 483–486. Bibcode:1927RSPSA.115..483D. doi:10.1098/rspa.1927.0105. ISSN 1364-5021.
- Dennison, David M. (1 March 1931). "The Infrared Spectra of Polyatomic Molecules Part I". Reviews of Modern Physics. 3 (2). American Physical Society (APS): 280–345. Bibcode:1931RvMP....3..280D. doi:10.1103/revmodphys.3.280. ISSN 0034-6861.
- Dennison, David M. (1 June 1940). "The Infra-Red Spectra of Polyatomic Molecules. Part II". Reviews of Modern Physics. 12 (3). American Physical Society (APS): 175–214. Bibcode:1940RvMP...12..175D. doi:10.1103/revmodphys.12.175. ISSN 0034-6861.
- Dennison, David M. (1974). "Recollections of physics and of physicists during the 1920s". American Journal of Physics. 42 (12). American Association of Physics Teachers (AAPT): 1051–1056. Bibcode:1974AmJPh..42.1051D. doi:10.1119/1.1987935. ISSN 0002-9505.
