= John Fincham =

British geneticist (1926–2005)

John Robert Stanley Fincham
- Born: 11 August 1926; Southgate, London, England
- Died: 9 February 2005 (aged 78); Edinburgh
- Education: University of Cambridge
- Known for: Head of the Genetics division at the John Innes Centre, the author of Fungal genetics
- Spouse: Ann K. Emerson
- Relatives: Sterling Howard Emerson (father-in-law)
- Scientific career
- Fields: Microbial genetics
- Workplaces: University of Cambridge, University of Leicester, Massachusetts Institute of Technology, John Innes Centre, California Institute of Technology
- Doctoral advisor: David G. Catcheside

John Robert Stanley Fincham FRS FRSE (11 August 1926 – 9 February 2005) was a British geneticist who made important contributions to biochemical genetics and microbial genetics.

== Education and personal life ==
Fincham was born on 11 August 1926 in Southgate, London, the son of Robert Fincham (b. 26 November 1898) and Winifred Emily Western (b. 16 July 1899). His father was a self-employed Hertfordshire nurseryman, through whom Fincham developed his interest in botany. He was educated at Hertford Grammar School, then at Peterhouse, Cambridge, where he read Natural Sciences. He earned his PhD in the Botany School at Cambridge and then did a year's postgraduate research at the California Institute of Technology with Sterling Howard Emerson, whose daughter Ann he married. He died on 9 February 2005 in Edinburgh.

== Career and research ==
Fincham laboratory was among the first to demonstrate "intragenic complementation" through finding "pseudowild" progeny from am1 × am2 crosses. He obtained the first direct evidence for the "one gene-one enzyme" hypothesis, using mutants of Neurospora crassa deficient in a specific enzyme called glutamate dehydrogenase.

Fincham was appointed first as lecturer in botany (1950–1954) and then as reader (1954–1960) at University of Leicester. A year as an associate professor in the Massachusetts Institute of Technology preceded his appointment as head of the Genetics Division of the John Innes Centre (JIC) in 1961. Fincham's appointment at the JIC is an acknowledgement that much really progressive work in biology is now done with microorganisms and is a strategic move by K.S. Dodds to give JIC leadership in the field. During his time at the John Innes Centre, his treatise with Peter Day, the first edition of Fungal Genetics (1963) was released. The book gathered existing knowledge of basic biology, recombination, tetrad analysis, mating systems, and extranuclear inheritance together with a single chapter on biochemical genetics, which provided a common background to a growing community of scientists. He remained at the John Innes until 1966, when he was appointed as professor and head of the newly established Department of Genetics at University of Leeds. In 1976, John was appointed to the Buchanan Chair of Genetics in Edinburgh and was head of the Department of Genetics until 1984. He was Editor of Heredity between 1971 and 1978.

Fincham was the Arthur Balfour Professor of Genetics at the University of Cambridge between 1984 and 1991. He was elected a Fellow of the Royal Society in 1969 and a Fellow of the Royal Society of Edinburgh in 1978. He was president of The Genetics Society from 1978 to 1981. In 1977 he was awarded the Emil Christian Hansen Medal for his contribution to research into fungi.
