= Ku Zing-whai =

Chinese physicist (1900–1983)

- 顾静徽/微
- Ku at Cornell, 1926
- Born: 1 July 1900; Jiading, Jiangsu, China
- Died: 30 October 1983 (aged 83); Beijing, China
- Other name: Gu Jing-Hui (-Wei)
- Education: Shanghai Tatung and Cornell (A.B.); Yale University (M.S.); University of Michigan (PhD)
- Occupations: Physicist; Educator
- Scientific career
- Fields: Low-temperature physics, molecular spectroscopy
- Workplaces: Nankai University; Shanghai Tatung University; CAS Institute of Physics; Guangxi University; Beijing Steel and Iron Institute
- Doctoral advisor: David M. Dennison

Ku Zing-whai (Chinese: 顾静徽/微; pinyin: Gù Jìnghuī or Jìngweī, 1 July 1900 – 30 October 1983) was a low-temperature physicist at the Beijing Steel and Iron Institute and the first Chinese woman to earn a PhD in physics. She was the postgraduate research advisor of Chien-Shiung Wu while at the Academia Sinica Institute of Physics, and a key influence in Wu's decision to pursue doctoral study in the United States.

Ku spent a decade studying abroad, specializing in molecular spectroscopy. Upon her return, she participated in the founding of the Chinese Physical Society and served as an early director for several university physics departments. She established a low-temperature physics laboratory at the Beijing Steel and Iron Institute.

== Early life and education ==
Ku was born on 1 July 1900 in Kating, Jiangsu, a small town by the Shanghai–Nanjing railway. Her parents died in her childhood, so Ku was raised by her step-mother. Ku received her secondary education in Kiangsu Provincial Normal School (now Suzhou High School), the youngest in her class. She entered Shanghai Tatung University in 1920, a school known for sending its students abroad. There she studied physics and mathematics under the X-ray physicist Hu Gangfu, and passed an exam that earned her a government-funded scholarship to study in the United States.

Ku transferred to Cornell University in 1923, studying in the College of Arts and Sciences. She also involved herself in the Chinese Students Club and the Women's Cosmopolitan Club there. After obtaining an A.B. at Cornell and a master's degree at Yale, Ku was admitted into the University of Michigan graduate program as a Barbour Scholar in 1928, under the spectroscopist David M. Dennison. In 1931, with her dissertation on "Intensity Distribution in Band Systems of Symmetrical Triatomic Molecules and the Absorption Spectrum of Chlorine-Dioxide", Ku became the first Chinese woman in modern history to obtain a PhD in physics.

== Career ==
Ku returned to China in 1931, succeeding Rao Yutai as chair of the physics department at Nankai University in Tianjin. At the inaugural meeting of the Chinese Physical Society (CPS), Ku served on the planning and thesis examination committees. In 1933, Ku left Nankai for a dual professorship at Shanghai Tatung and research fellowship at Academia Sinica (now Chinese Academy of Sciences).

At Academia Sinica, Ku met Chien-Shiung Wu, who had just graduated university in 1934. Ku was the only woman on the physics faculty at the time, and became a close mentor to Wu—visiting the academy every week to advise her research on the spectra of low-temperature gases, while also encouraging her to also pursue an advanced degree in the United States, and teaching her English to better prepare. Wu was admitted into the University of Michigan physics program in 1936, but immediately transferred to University of California, Berkeley after learning of extensive gender discrimination at the University of Michigan. Wu later became one of the most renowned experimental physicists for her demonstration of CP violation in the weak force. She paid visits to Ku in Beijing in 1973 and 1977.

From 1938 to 1939, Ku was a visiting scholar at the Kaiser Wilhelm Institute for Physics in Berlin. She had submitted a paper—on the Stark effect in low-temperature chrome alum—to Physik Z. there, but World War II broke out in Europe before it could be published. Wu returned to China in the midst of the Japanese invasion. With most universities relocating westward to escape the war, Ku moved to Tangshan Jiao Tong University in 1940, then stayed at Guangxi University from 1941 until the end of the war. In 1946, Ku returned to Tatung University. (Between 1947 and 1949 Ku left for "上海编译馆".)

In 1952, Ku moved to Beijing, taking on the chair of the physics department at Beijing Steel and Iron Institute (now USTB) and the inaugural deputy director of CPS's Beijing Division. She conducted research in low-temperature physics, while also teaching many classes and editing the CPS journals. Used to conversing in Shanghainese and teaching in American English, Ku needed a Mandarin translator to teach her new students in Beijing. Ku remained there until her death in 1983.

== Personal life ==
While at Academia Sinica, Ku shared a apartment with the writer Wen Yuan-ning for several weeks; Wen "did the cooking and she the dish-washing". They quickly became friends, and in 1934 Wen published a laudatory biography of Ku in his Intimate Portraits column on the popular English-language weekly The China Critic, writing:

The other day I was listening to a heated discussion on the subject of women's education—what an age-old topic! I call it primitive, for to think at a time when women's position in the society has been more or less established that there should still be doubts as to the advisability of educating your daughter or sister. However, doubt exists, even among women, although they only whisper it among themselves. Well, the consensus of opinion is that higher education is not necessary for women, because they very seldom make use of it. One person held the view that he had known a woman biologist who went on to teach English all her life long, and another Master of English Literature who got married and did not know how to rear her children. The absurdity of the contention is not for this column to refute. But to come back from my digression. The point is how this controversial conversation led to me to see how very few men of that type knew women like Ku Zing-whai.

In 1940, Ku married Shi Ruwei (Chinese: 施汝为; pinyin: Shī Rǔwèi). Shi had grown up in the same village, studying chemistry under Hu Gangfu in National Nanking Higher Normal University from 1920 to 1925 whilst Hu was simultaneously commuting to Shanghai Tatung to teach Ku. Shi and Ku reunited at Academia Sinica, and they supported each other during the Sino-Japanese War. They had one son.

Ku joined the Chinese Communist Party in 1956. She died in Beijing on 30 October 1983, months after her husband's passing.

== Legacy ==
A retrospective of Ku was published by the Chinese Physical Society on International Women's Day in 2009. A play telling the story of Ku and Chien-Shiung Wu, titled "When We Two Parted" (春逝), premiered on 2020 and has since been performed over a hundred times, with Wang Xiaohuan portraying Ku.

== Dissertation ==
- Ku, Z. W. (1933), "The Absorption Spectrum of Chlorine Dioxide". Physical Review. 44. American Physical Society: 376.
- Ku, Z. W. (1933), "Intensity Distribution in a Band System of Symmetrical Triatomic Molecules". Physical Review. 44. American Physical Society: 383.
