= Friedrich Paschen =

German physicist (1865–1947)

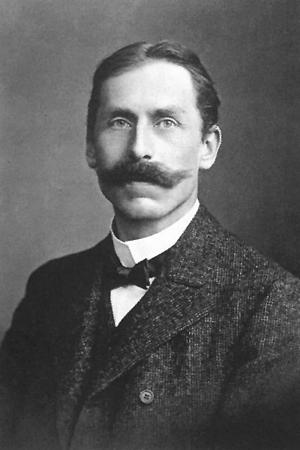
- Born: 22 January 1865; Schwerin
- Died: 25 February 1947 (aged 82); Potsdam
- Known for: Paschen–Back effect Paschen series Paschen's law
- Awards: Rumford Medal (1928)
- Scientific career
- Institutions: University of Tübingen
- Doctoral students: Walther Gerlach
- Other notable students: Harrison M. Randall

Louis Carl Heinrich Friedrich Paschen (22 January 1865 – 25 February 1947) was a German physicist, known for his work on electrical discharges. He is also known for the Paschen series, a series of hydrogen spectral lines in the infrared region that he first observed in 1908. He established the now widely used Paschen curve in his article "Über die zum Funkenübergang in Luft, Wasserstoff und Kohlensäure bei verschiedenen Drücken erforderliche Potentialdifferenz". He is known for the Paschen-Back effect, which is the Zeeman effect's becoming non-linear at high magnetic field. He helped explain the hollow cathode effect in 1916.

== Life ==
Paschen was born in Schwerin, Grand Duchy of Mecklenburg-Schwerin. From 1884 to 1888 he studied at the universities of Berlin and Strassburg, after which he became an assistant at the Academy of Münster. He became a professor at the Technische Hochschule Hannover in 1893 and professor of physics at the University of Tübingen in 1901. He served as president of the Physikalisch-Technischen Reichsanstalt from 1924–33 and an honorary professor of the University of Berlin in 1925.

During the second world war he had the Chinese scientist He Zehui to stay at his house and she became like a daughter to him. With his help she was introduced to Walther Bothe who led the Kaiser Wilhelm Institute in Heidelberg.

Paschen taught in Berlin until his death in Potsdam in 1947. He is buried at the Stahnsdorf South-Western Cemetery.

== See also ==
- Paschen notation
- Townsend discharge
