= James Raymond Lawson =

American physicist (1915–1996)

- Born: January 15, 1915; Louisville, Kentucky, U.S.
- Died: December 21, 1996 (aged 81); Nashville, Tennessee, U.S.
- Education: Fisk University; University of Michigan
- Spouse: Lillian Arcaeneaux
- Children: 2 sons, 2 daughters
- Scientific career
- Fields: Infrared Spectroscopy
- Thesis: The Infrafed Absorption Spectra Of A Number Of Heavy Tetrahedral Molecules With Substituted Groups And A Study Of Hindered Rotation In Methyl Alcohol (1939)

James Raymond Lawson (January 15, 1915 – December 21, 1996) was an American physicist and university administrator. He was the president of Fisk University, a historically black university in Nashville, Tennessee, from 1967 to 1975.

== Early life ==
James Raymond Lawson was born on January 15, 1915, in Louisville, Kentucky. His father, Daniel LaMont Lawson, was a Fisk alumnus, Fisk Jubilee Singer and an academic dean at Simmons College.

Lawson attended Fisk University, where he conducted research in the field of infrared spectroscopy under the mentorship of Elmer S. Imes. He was a member of the Kappa Alpha Psi fraternity and was elected to the academic honor society Phi Beta Kappa. He was the first student to graduate from Fisk with a bachelor's degree in physics, doing so in 1935. He attended the University of Michigan on a Rosenwald Fellowship, where he earned a PhD in physics in 1939. His thesis was titled "The Infrared Absorption Spectra of a Number of Heavy Tetrahedral Molecules with Substituted Groups and a Study of Hindered Rotation in Methyl Alcohol."

== Career ==
Lawson was an assistant professor of physics at Southern University from 1939 to 1940, and an associate professor at Langston University from 1940 to 1942. He became an associate professor and chair of the physics department at his alma mater, Fisk University, in 1942. There, he established the Fisk Infrared Research Laboratory and, together with fellow physicist Nelson Fuson, began the Fisk Infrared Spectroscopy Institute in 1950.

The graduate students that Lawson mentored at Fisk presented their research at conferences of the American Physical Society and American Chemical Society, effectively integrating them.

From 1955 to 1957, he was the chair of the physics department at Tennessee A & I University, later known as Tennessee State University. He became a full professor and chair of the physics department at Fisk University in 1957, and the vice president from 1966 to 1967.

Lawson was the president of Fisk University from 1967 to 1975. He was the first alumnus to serve as president. Under his leadership, Fisk saw its highest number of enrolled students. Fisk's predominantly white donor base had been declining since the early 1960s, before Lawson's presidency, when many students participated in nonviolent civil rights demonstrations. As many students joined or were influenced by the Black Power movement during the late 1960s, donor support dwindled further, leading to "salary cuts of twenty percent and operational budget cuts of twenty-five percent". Fisk's endowment went from $10 million to $4 million. Lawson resigned due to "severe decreases in faculty, staff and student enrollment". In addition, his obituary in The Tennessean said he resigned "for health reasons".

Lawson subsequently worked for the Energy Research and Development Administration and NASA in Washington, D.C. He also served on the board of the Oak Ridge Associated Universities, and he was a member of the American Institute of Physics, the American Association of Physics Teachers, and the American Physical Society.

Lawson was awarded an honorary Ph.D. from Fisk University in May 1996.

== Death ==
Lawson married Lillian Arcaeneaux; they had two sons and two daughters. He resided in Nashville, where he died on December 21, 1996, at age 81. His funeral was held at the Holy Trinity Episcopal Church.
