= Harrison M. Randall =

American physicist

- Born: 17 December 1870; Burr Oak, Michigan
- Died: 10 November 1969 (aged 98)
- Education: University of Michigan (PhD, BS)
- Awards: Frederic Ives Medal (1952)
- Scientific career
- Fields: Physicist
- Workplaces: University of Michigan (1902-41); University of Tübingen (1910-11)
- Thesis: On the Coefficient of Expansion of Quartz (1902)
- Academic advisors: Friedrich Paschen
- Doctoral students: Nelson Fuson; Elmer Imes

Harrison McAllister Randall (December 17, 1870 – November 10, 1969) was an American physicist and longtime department head in the physics department of the University of Michigan. He is the key figure responsible for establishing theoretical physics research at that university. He served as the president of the American Physical Society in 1937.

== Biography ==
Randall was born in Burr Oak, Michigan, on December 17, 1870. His family then moved to Ann Arbor, where he spent his formative years. He graduated from the Ann Arbor High School in 1889.

=== College years ===
Randall entered the University of Michigan at the age of 19 and earned his bachelor's degree in Physics from the university in 1893. A year later he completed a master's degree, then spent a few years teaching in high schools in West Bay City and Saginaw, living with his intended Ida Muma.

In 1899 he returned to the University of Michigan to pursue a PhD in Physics while working as a graduate student instructor. He completed his PhD in 1902 and took a position on the faculty. His PhD thesis measured the coefficient of expansion of quartz.

=== Sabbatical in Europe ===
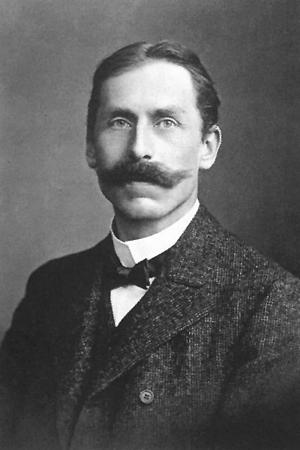
Friedrich Paschen, Randall's mentor during his sabbatical year at University of Tübingen

During his 1910-11 sabbatical year, Randall moved abroad to work under Friedrich Paschen at the University of Tübingen. This was shortly after Paschen had discovered what is now called the Paschen series in the spectrum of hydrogen, and about 20 years after the discovery of what is now called Paschen's Law of electrical discharges. Randall said that he knew nothing about spectroscopy at the time and Paschen simply handed him a spectrometer and expected him to get to work—which he ultimately did. Under Paschen's mentorship, Randall became an expert in infrared spectroscopy. Even to the end of his life Randall considered Paschen his greatest mentor.

=== Theoretical physics at Michigan ===
Prior to 1910, the physics department at the University of Michigan had focused on precision metrology. Quantum mechanics did not yet exist as a field, and the study of atomic spectra was largely ad hoc experimentation with very little theoretical underpinning. Randall came home from his 1910 sabbatical at Tübingen with new ideas, and went on to overhaul physics research at Michigan. He served as the head of the physics department from 1915 to 1941 and implemented changes that elevated the university to a prominent status in the field.

At that time Walter Colby was the only resident theorist, so, with Randall’s encouragement, Colby recruited Oskar Klein. Although Klein returned to Europe after two years, the importance of theoretical colleagues was established. Subsequently, Randall brought Otto Laporte, Samuel Goudsmit, George Uhlenbeck and David Dennison onto the faculty. Randall and Colby also started the Michigan Summer Symposia in Theoretical Physics, an annual, multi-week gathering that held from 1927 to 1941. It provided lectures from famous physicists, including Niels Bohr, Paul Dirac, Enrico Fermi, Werner Heisenberg, Wolfgang Pauli and others. Randall also started a program in which the university's physicists would get a sabbatical every two years to work with physicists in Europe.

In 1925 Randall became vice-president of the American Association for the Advancement of Science. Randall was President of the American Physical Society in 1937, and remained chair of the physics department at the same time. From 1917 to 1919 Randall was a researcher at the National Bureau of Standards.

Harrison Randall died on November 10, 1969, at the age of 98.

== Awards ==
- The Optical Society Frederic Ives Medal (1952)

== Personal life ==
In interviews, Randall displayed a complex mix of humility—often downplaying his own substantial accomplishments—and bitterness over what he felt were his ideas stolen by other researchers, particularly his students who went on to publish more prominently than he ever did.

Randall married Ida Muma on August 24, 1898. His daughter Mary Foote Randall married geneticist Sterling Howard Emerson.

== Publications ==
- Oetjen, R. A.; Randall, H. M. (1 June 1944). "The Infra-Red Spectra of the Isomeric Octanes in the Vapor Phase". Reviews of Modern Physics. 16 (3–4). American Physical Society (APS): 265–270. Bibcode:1944RvMP...16..265O. doi:10.1103/revmodphys.16.265. ISSN 0034-6861.
- Randall, Harrison Mcallister (1905). "On the Coefficient of Expansion of Quartz". Physical Review. Series I. 20 (1). American Physical Society (APS): 10–37. Bibcode:1905PhRvI..20...10R. doi:10.1103/physrevseriesi.20.10. hdl:2027/mdp.39015030725934. ISSN 1536-6065. (this is a refinement of his 1902 thesis experiment)
- Randall, H. M. (1 January 1954). "Infrared Spectroscopy at the University of Michigan*". Journal of the Optical Society of America. 44 (2). The Optical Society: 97–103. doi:10.1364/josa.44.000097. ISSN 0030-3941. (overview of work in Ann Arbor)
- Nielsen, Harald H. (1 November 1960). "Harrison McAllister RandallA Half-Century of Infrared Spectroscopy". Journal of the Optical Society of America. 50 (12). The Optical Society: 1147. doi:10.1364/josa.50.001147. ISSN 0030-3941. (Ives medal encomium for Harrison M. Randall)
- Randall, H. M.; Dennison, D. M.; Ginsburg, Nathan; Weber, Louis R. (1 July 1937). "The Far Infrared Spectrum of Water Vapor". Physical Review. 52 (3). American Physical Society (APS): 160–174. Bibcode:1937PhRv...52..160R. doi:10.1103/physrev.52.160. ISSN 0031-899X.
- Randall, H. M.; Smith, D. W. (1 October 1953). "Infrared Spectroscopy in Bacteriological Research*". Journal of the Optical Society of America. 43 (11). The Optical Society: 1086–1092. doi:10.1364/josa.43.001086. ISSN 0030-3941. PMID 13109611. (example of work done after his retirement)
- Sawyer, Ralph A. (1970). "Obituary: Harrison Randall of Michigan; Applied Infrared Studies to Bacteria". Physics Today. 23 (1). AIP Publishing: 127–129. doi:10.1063/1.3021913. ISSN 0031-9228.
