= Nelson Fuson =

Physicist and Quaker activist

- Born: 4 September 1913; Guangzhou, China
- Died: 5 February 2006 (aged 92); Kennett Square, Pennsylvania
- Scientific career
- Thesis: The Far Infrared Absorption Spectrum and the Rotational Structure of the Heavy Water Vapor Molecule (1938)
- Doctoral advisor: Harrison M. Randall
- Other academic advisors: David M. Dennison

Nelson Fuson (4 September 1913 – 5 February 2006) was an American physicist and longtime professor at Fisk University. Along with his wife, Marian Darnell Fuson, the Fusons were Quaker pacifists and active in the efforts of desegregation in the Nashville area during the Civil Rights Movement.

== Early life and education ==
Nelson Fuson was born on September 4, 1913, in Guangzhou, China. His parents, Chester and Phoebe Fuson, were American Presbyterian missionaries, and Fuson grew up between Guangzhou and Emporia, Kansas. He attended two years of high school at the Shanghai American School and completed his secondary education in Emporia.

Fuson attended the College of Emporia and graduated with a bachelor's degree in 1934. He received his master's degree in physics and astronomy at the University of Kansas in 1935, and went on to complete a doctorate in physics at the University of Michigan. He completed his PhD in 1938, and his thesis was titled "The Far Infrared Absorption Spectrum and the Rotational Structure of the Heavy Water Vapor Molecule." His doctoral advisor was Harrison M. Randall, and he also studied under David M. Dennison.

== Career ==
=== Civilian public service ===
After receiving his PhD, Fuson worked for three years as an instructor at Rutgers University. When the United States entered World War II, he was drafted to military service, but as a conscientious objector and pacificist, worked in the Civilian Public Service (CPS). Beginning in 1941, Fuson began his service working under the American Friends Service Committee for the National Park Service in Patapsco, Maryland.

He then moved on to Largo, Indiana, in 1942, where he was training with the Church of the Brethren for a China Unit for humanitarian relief in Guangzhou. Later that year, he was sent to Columbia University as part of a joint civilian/military seminar in international administration. From there, in 1943 he joined the American Friends Service Committee in Philadelphia, living at the Pendle Hill Quaker Center for Study and Contemplation, and training a new China humanitarian unit. There, he taught conversational Chinese, having learned the language while growing up in Guangzhou. However, with the adoption of the Starnes Rider, Congress denied conscientious objectors the opportunity to serve abroad, and the China unit project was cancelled. Between 1943 and 1944, Fuson worked in conservation and agriculture in Big Flats, New York, and Trenton, New Jersey.

Fuson spent more than four years in the Civilian Public Service, concluding his final year of service at the University of Michigan conducting infrared research on the structure of penicillin under the Office of Scientific Research and Development.

=== Academic career ===
Following his release from the Civilian Public Service, the Fusons moved to Baltimore, Maryland, where Nelson Fuson worked from 1946 to 1948 at Johns Hopkins University, conducting research on infrared detectors. Between 1948 and 1949, Fuson worked as a professor at Howard University, in Washington, D.C.

In 1949, Fuson joined the faculty of Fisk University as an associate professor of physics, after being personally visited by Fisk president Charles S. Johnson. Fuson would remain at Fisk, a historically Black university, for more than 40 years. During his career, he served as chairman of the Physics Department and director of the Infrared Spectroscopy Research Laboratory, and directed the university's summer institutes for more than 28 years. In 1950, Fuson and James Raymond Lawson founded the Fisk Infrared Spectroscopy Institute. In 1964, they held a Latin American Fisk Infrared Institute in São Paulo, Brazil. Fuson was also in charge of the university's exchange student program.

During his tenure at Fisk, Fuson took a sabbatical period between 1956 and 1959 to teach at the University of Bordeaux, France.

Fuson was a member of numerous professional societies during his career, including the American Chemical Society, the American Physical Society, and was an elected fellow of the American Association for the Advancement of Science. Between 1966 and 1968, Fuson was president of the Coblentz Society.

== Activism ==
Nelson and Marian Fuson remained dedicated to various social and political causes during their lives, particularly related to the Civil Rights Movement and the sit-ins and other protests centered in Nashville, Tennessee. The Fusons took part in letter writing against local businesses' segregation practices, and in support of student demands for change. Nelson Fuson also served as chairman of Nashville's branch of the Fellowship of Reconciliation, and facilitated donations and other involvement from outside groups looking to support the cause. At one point, the Fuson's family babysitter, a Fisk student, was arrested, prompting further engagement with student protests. They had frequent contact with Freedom Riders including Diane Nash, Pauline Knight and Bernard Lafayette. They also worked with the Reverend James Lawson, who conducted workshops on nonviolent protest for the Fisk community.

After the bombing of attorney Z. Alexander Looby's home by segregationists, the Fuson family helped raise money to help pay for the damages that resulted from the attack. Along with Fisk faculty including the historian August Meier, the Fusons were on the membership committee for the National Association for the Advancement of Colored People.

The Fusons also pledged support for fellow Fisk University faculty member Lee Lorch, a mathematics professor who had refused to appear before the House Un-American Activities Committee after he and his wife had attempted to enroll their daughter in an all-Black school in Nashville. Despite their efforts and support of the faculty, however, Lorch was dismissed from Fisk in 1955.

Fisk graduate students in the infrared laboratory led by Fuson and James R. Lawson also were a major part of the integration of the Southeastern Section of the American Physical Society.

== Personal life ==
Nelson Fuson married Marian Darnell on June 23, 1945, at the Quaker Friends Meeting in Moorestown, New Jersey. Marian Darnell was a 1942 graduate of Oberlin College. The couple met while Fuson was stationed at the Pendle Hill Quaker Center for Study and Contemplation, in Wallingford, Pennsylvania, with the Civilian Public Service. They had two sons, Allan and Dan Fuson.

While living and teaching at Fisk University, Nelson and Marian Fuson held Quaker meetings in their home for the Nashville area, and were founders of the Nashville Monthly Meeting. They were also active in the Quaker community as founders of the Southern Appalachian Yearly Meeting and active in the AFSC International Seminar program and Friends General Conference.
