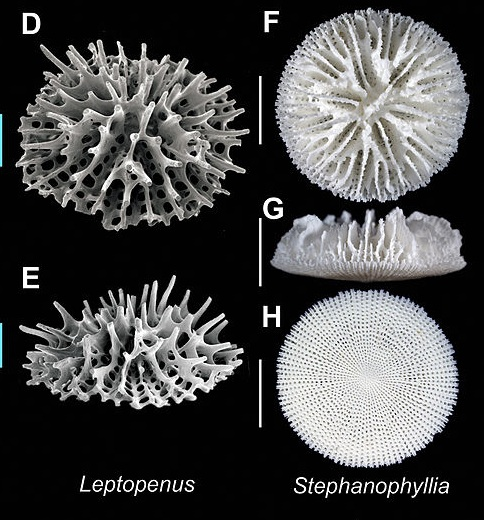

Scientific classification
- Kingdom: Animalia
- Phylum: Cnidaria
- Subphylum: Anthozoa
- Class: Hexacorallia
- Order: Scleractinia
- Family: Micrabaciidae; Vaughan, 1905

Genera
- See text

= Micrabaciidae =

Family of corals

Micrabaciidae is a family of marine stony corals of the order Scleractinia.

The World Register of Marine Species lists the following genera:

- Leptopenus Moseley, 1881
- Letepsammia Yabe & Eguchi, 1932
- Micrabacia† Milne Edwards & Haime, 1849
- Rhombopsammia Owens, 1986
- Stephanophyllia Michelin, 1841
