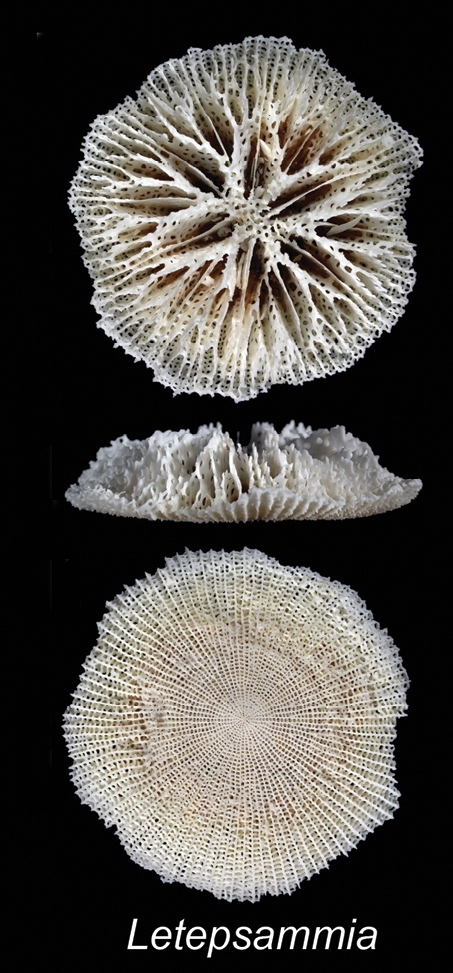
- Letepsammia formosissima

Scientific classification
- Domain: Eukaryota
- Kingdom: Animalia
- Phylum: Cnidaria
- Subphylum: Anthozoa
- Class: Hexacorallia
- Order: Scleractinia
- Family: Micrabaciidae
- Genus: Letepsammia; Yabe & Eguchi, 1932

= Letepsammia =

Genus of corals

Letepsammia is a genus of corals belonging to the family Micrabaciidae.

The species of this genus are found in Pacific and Indian Ocean.

Species:

- Letepsammia fissilis Cairns, 1995
- Letepsammia formosissima (Moseley, 1876)
- Letepsammia franki Owens, 1994
- Letepsammia superstes (Ortmann, 1888)
