= Elmer Imes =

African-American physicist (1883–1941))

- Born: Elmer Samuel Imes; October 12, 1883; Memphis, Tennessee, US
- Died: September 11, 1941 (aged 57)
- Education: Fisk University; University of Michigan
- Spouse: Nella Larsen (m. 1919; div. 1933)
- Scientific career
- Fields: Physics
- Workplaces: New York University; Georgia Normal and Agricultural Institute; Fisk University
- Thesis: Measurements on the Near Infra-Red Absorption of Some Diatomic Gases (1918)
- Doctoral advisor: Harrison M. Randall

Elmer Samuel Imes (October 12, 1883 – September 11, 1941) was an American physicist who demonstrated for the first time that quantum theory could be applied to the rotational energy states of molecules, as well as the vibration and electronic levels. His work provided an early verification of quantum theory, and his spectroscopy instrumentation inventions, which include one of the earliest applications of high resolution infrared spectroscopy, led to development of the field of study of molecular structure through infrared spectroscopy.

He was the second African American to earn a Ph.D. in physics and the first in the 20th century. He was among the first known African-American scientists to make important contributions to modern physics; others' prior work was unrecorded or uncredited. While working in industry, he gained four patents for instruments to be used for measuring magnetic and electric properties. As an academic, he developed and chaired the department of physics at Fisk University, serving from 1930 to 1941.

Born in Memphis, Tennessee, he was the child of college-educated parents. His father's family were people of color who had been free since before the American Revolution. His mother's family, former slaves, had moved to Oberlin, Ohio, after the American Civil War. Both his parents graduated from Oberlin College.

== Biography ==
=== Early life and education ===
Imes was born in 1883 in Memphis, Tennessee to Elizabeth (née Wallace) and Benjamin A. Imes, both of whom were college educated. They had met as students at Oberlin College in Ohio. They married there in 1880. His father earned a divinity degree at Oberlin Theological Seminary in 1880. Benjamin was descended from free people of color, who had been established in south-central Pennsylvania by the time of the Revolution.

Elmer's mother Elizabeth was born into slavery; her family had moved to Oberlin when she was a child, after the American Civil War and emancipation. Imes had two younger brothers: Albert Lovejoy Imes and William Lloyd Imes. The latter became a minister and was later pastor of St. James Presbyterian Church in New York City. He held degrees from Fisk, Union Theological Seminary, and Columbia University.

Imes and his brothers attended grammar school in Oberlin. Their parents became missionaries with the American Missionary Association and moved to the South to serve freedmen and their children. Imes completed his high school education at the Agricultural and Mechanical High School in Normal, Alabama. He graduated in 1903 from Fisk University, a historically black college, with a bachelor's degree in science.

Upon graduating from Fisk, Imes taught mathematics and physics at Georgia Normal and Agricultural Institute (now Albany State University), a historically black college in Albany, Georgia. He also taught at the Emerson Institute, founded in Mobile, Alabama by the American Missionary Association. Imes returned to Fisk in 1913 as an instructor of science and mathematics. During his tenure there, Imes also earned a master's degree in science from Fisk University.

He went to the University of Michigan for graduate study in physics, earning a Ph.D. in physics in 1918. He studied under Harrison McAllister Randall. His work as a graduate student to measure the rotational-vibrational spectra of diatomic molecules gained recognition from the scientific community. Imes was the second African American to receive a Ph.D. in physics since Edward Bouchet did so from Yale University in 1876; Imes was the first African American in the 20th century to gain this degree.

On May 3, 1919, after moving to New York City to work in industry, Imes married Nella Larsen, a nurse who became a writer. An American of Danish and Afro-Caribbean descent, she is considered part of the Harlem Renaissance, having published short stories and two novels in the late 1920s. The couple had moved from Jersey City, New Jersey, to Harlem, where they became part of the professional and cultural society that included artists and intellectuals such as Langston Hughes and W.E.B. Du Bois, members of the black elite.

Due to strains in their marriage and his infidelity, they divorced in 1933. Imes had returned to Fisk University in 1929 for an academic career, developing and leading its physics department.

=== International recognition ===
Imes's research and doctoral thesis led to his publication of Measurements on the Near-Infrared Absorption of Some Diatomic Gases in November 1919 in the Astrophysical Journal. This work was followed by a paper co-authored and presented in November 1919 jointly with Harrison M. Randall, "The Fine Structure of the Near Infra-Red Absorption Bands of HCI, HBr, and HF" at the American Physical Society; it was published in the Physical Review in February 1920. This work demonstrated for the first time that quantum theory could be applied to the rotational energy states of molecules, as well as to the vibration and electronic levels. Imes's work provided an early verification of quantum theory. It became known in Europe as well as in the United States. Imes's work was one of the earliest applications of high resolution infrared spectroscopy and provided the first detailed spectra of molecules. This led to development of the field of study of molecular structure through infrared spectroscopy.

=== Professional life ===
In the early 1920s, Imes found difficulty in securing employment in academia. Not many black colleges had physics programs and white colleges did not hire him. During this time, he moved to New York City, a social hub for black intellectuals. As a result, he became a physics consultant and researcher after completing his doctorate. He worked in physics at the Federal Engineers Development Corporation in 1918 and with the Burrows Magnetic Equipment Corporation in 1922. In 1927, Imes went to work as a research engineer at E.A. Everett Signal Supplies. During the decade that Imes worked in the scientific and materials industry, his research resulted in four patents for instruments that were used for measuring magnetic and electric properties.

In 1930, Imes returned to Fisk University, where he served as chair of the physics department. Imes is credited with the academic development of the physics programs at Fisk. Many of his students went on to obtain doctoral degrees from highly ranked schools such as the University of Michigan. While at Fisk, Imes developed a course in cultural physics, to teach students about the history of science. In 1931, Imes was named one of the thirteen most gifted Black Americans.

In 1939, Imes returned to New York, where he conducted research as a scholar in magnetic materials at the physics department at New York University.

=== Death ===
Imes died of throat cancer on September 11, 1941. His colleague Swann wrote in an obituary for the journal Science that, "his research laboratory was a mecca for those who sought an atmosphere of calm and contentment. Peacefully smoking a pipe, Imes could always be relied upon to bring to any discussion an atmosphere of philosophic soundness and levelheaded practicalness. Gifted, moreover with a poetic disposition, he was widely read in literature, and a discriminating and ardent appreciator of music."

== Memberships and honors ==
Imes was part of Sigma Xi National Honor Society; The American Physical Society; The American Society for Testing Materials; and The American Institute of Electrical Engineers.

In 2006, the Elmer S. Imes Scholarship was established in his name by the National Society of Black Physicists.

== Notable publications ==
- Imes, Elmer S. "Measurements on the Near Infra-Red Absorption of Some Diatomic Gases." Astrophysical Journal, vol. 50, 1919, 251 - 276. doi:10.1086/142504.

== Patents ==
- Method Of Testing Magnetizable Objects. US 1686815 A, Oct. 9, 1928.
- Apparatus For Testing Magnetizable Objects. US 1800676 A, April 14, 1931.
- Electrical Resistance Composition. US 1818184 A, Aug. 11, 1931.
- Method Of And Apparatus For Testing Magnetizable Objects. US 1807411 A, May 26, 1931.
