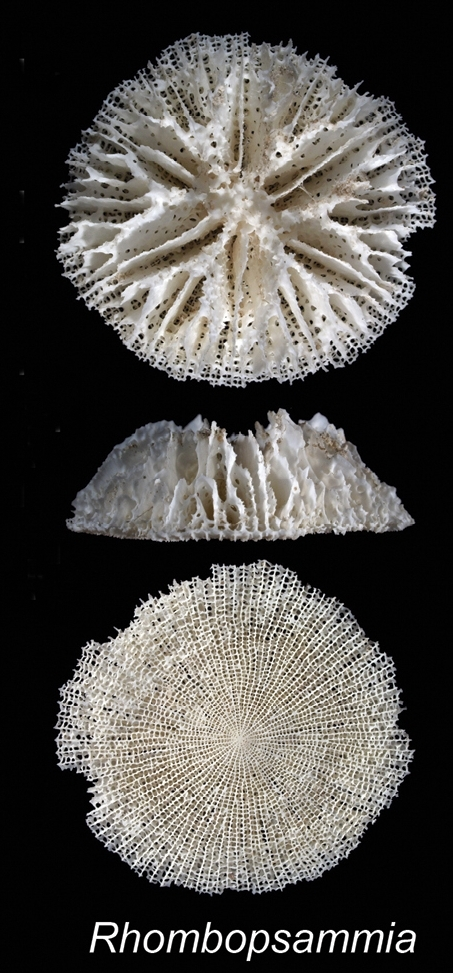
- Rhombopsammia niphada

Scientific classification
- Kingdom: Animalia
- Phylum: Cnidaria
- Subphylum: Anthozoa
- Class: Hexacorallia
- Order: Scleractinia
- Family: Micrabaciidae
- Genus: Rhombopsammia; Owens, 1986

Species
- See text

= Rhombopsammia =

Genus of corals

Rhombopsammia is a genus of stony corals in the family Micrabaciidae commonly known as button corals.

== Species ==
The World Register of Marine Species currently lists the following species:

- Rhombopsammia niphada Owens, 1986
- Rhombopsammia squiresi Owens, 1986
