= Samuel Goudsmit =

Dutch-American physicist (1902–1978)

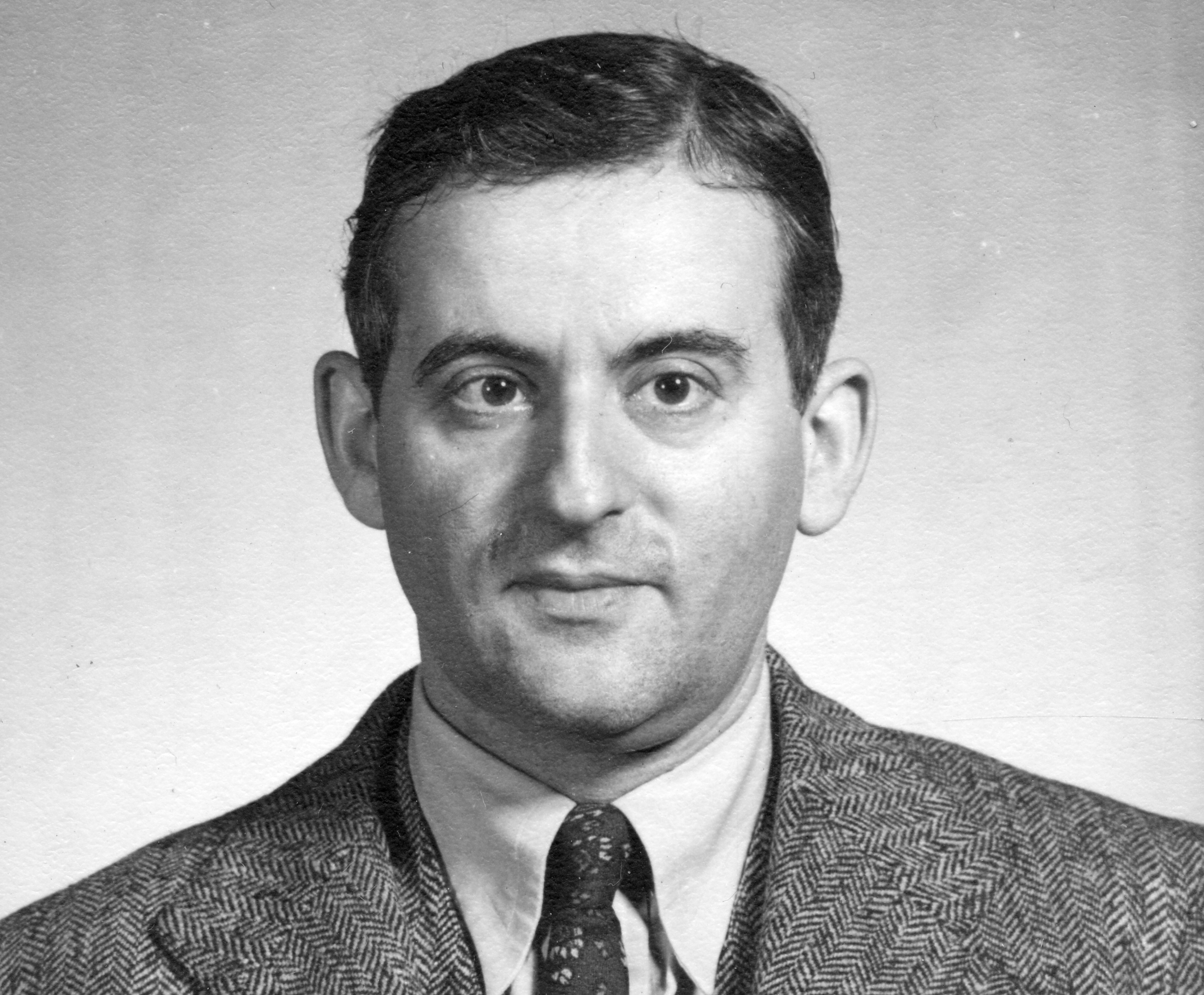
- Goudsmit in c. 1940
- Born: Samuel Abraham Goudsmit; July 11, 1902; The Hague, Netherlands
- Died: December 4, 1978 (aged 76); Reno, Nevada, U.S.
- Education: University of Leiden (Ph.D) (1927)
- Known for: Electron spin; Operation Alsos
- Spouses: Jaantje Logher (m. 1927; div. 1960) Irene Bejach (m. 1960)
- Children: Esther Marianne Goudsmit
- Awards: National Medal of Science (1976); Presidential Medal of Freedom
- Scientific career
- Fields: Physics
- Workplaces: University of Michigan
- Doctoral students: Robert Bacher

Samuel Abraham Goudsmit (July 11, 1902 – December 4, 1978) was a Dutch-American physicist famous for jointly proposing the concept of electron spin with George Eugene Uhlenbeck in 1925.

Goudsmit, along with Uhlenbeck, was nominated numerous times for the Nobel Prize in Physics for their discovery of electron spin but never won, despite strong support from nominators. I. I. Rabi remarked that the omission of Goudsmit and Uhlenbeck from the Nobel Prize list "will always be a mystery to me."

== Life and career ==
Goudsmit was born in The Hague, Netherlands, of Dutch Jewish descent. He was the son of Isaac Goudsmit, a manufacturer of water-closets, and Marianne Goudsmit-Gompers, who ran a millinery shop. In 1943, his parents were deported to a concentration camp by the German occupiers of the Netherlands and were murdered there.

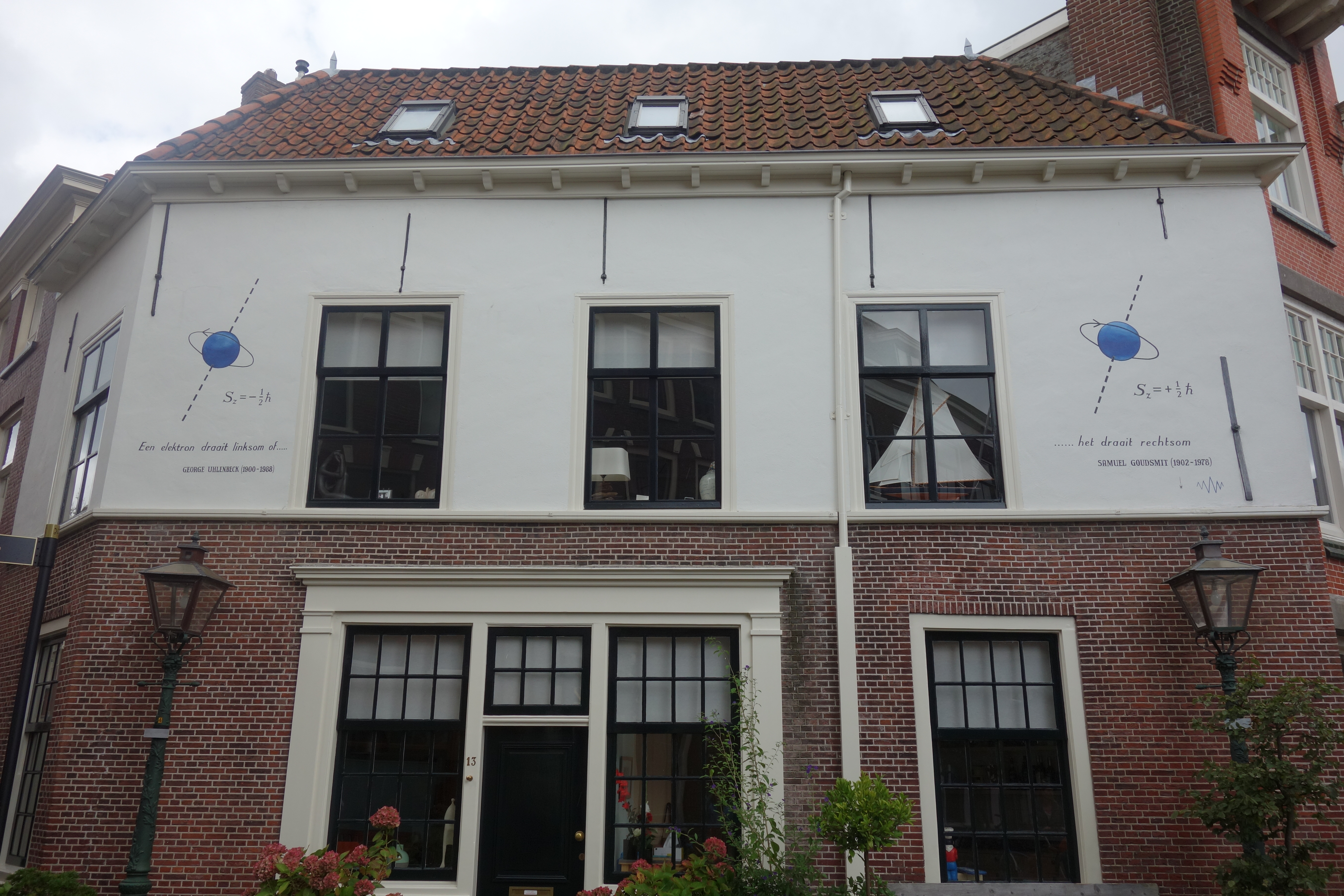
Visualization of electron spin on a wall in Leiden

Goudsmit studied physics at the University of Leiden under Paul Ehrenfest, where he obtained his PhD in 1927. After receiving his PhD, Goudsmit served as a professor at the University of Michigan between 1927 and 1946. In 1930 he co-authored a text with Linus Pauling titled The Structure of Line Spectra.

During World War II he worked at the Massachusetts Institute of Technology. As scientific head of the Alsos Mission, he successfully reached a German group of nuclear physicists around Werner Heisenberg and Otto Hahn at Hechingen (then French zone) in advance of French physicist Yves Rocard, who had previously succeeded in recruiting German scientists to come to France. He was awarded the Presidential Medal of Freedom for his work as part of the Alsos mission.

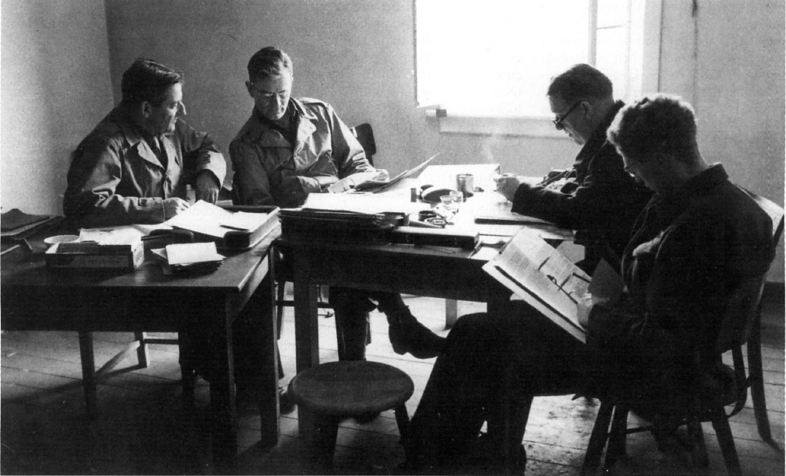
Alsos Members

Alsos, part of the Manhattan Project, was designed to assess the progress of the Nazi atomic bomb project. In the book Alsos, published in 1947, Goudsmit concludes that the Germans did not get close to creating a weapon. He attributed this to the inability of science to function under a totalitarian state and to Nazi scientists' lack of understanding of how to engineer an atomic bomb. Both of these conclusions have been disputed by later historians (see Heisenberg) and contradicted by the fact that the totalitarian Soviet state produced the bomb shortly after the book's release. However that statement overlooks the actions of physicist Klaus Fuchs who sent "many intelligence reports directly from Los Alamos".

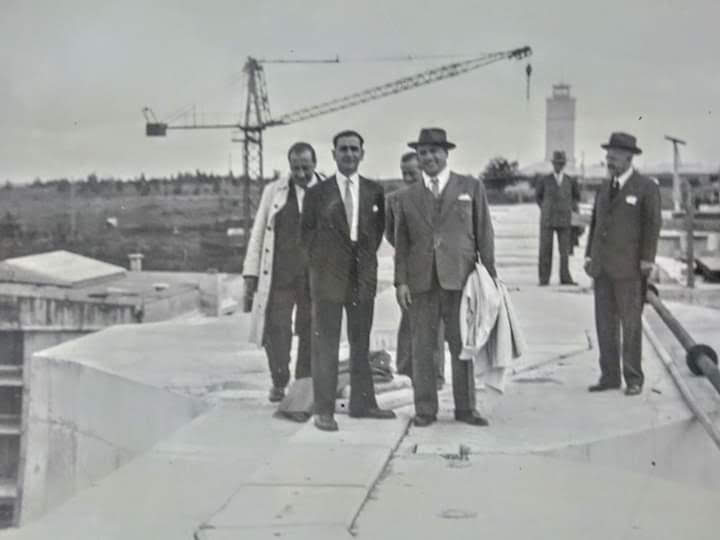
Samuel Goudsmit and Wolfgang Pauli in Uruguay, 1942, Rio Negro Hydro site works, when the Nazi German engineers were deported

After the war he was briefly a professor at Northwestern University, and from 1948 to 1970 was a senior scientist at the Brookhaven National Laboratory, chairing the Physics Department 1952–1960. He meanwhile became well known as editor-in-chief of the leading physics journal Physical Review, published by the American Physical Society. In July 1958 he started the journal Physical Review Letters, which offers short notes with attendant brief delays. On his retirement as editor in 1974, Goudsmit moved to the faculty of the University of Nevada, Reno, where he remained until his death four years later.

As a student in Leiden he also developed an interest in Ancient Egypt. He collected Egyptian antiquities and made a few scholarly contributions to Egyptology. His wife bequeathed the Samuel A. Goudsmit Collection of Egyptian Antiquities to the Kelsey Museum of Archaeology at the University of Michigan in Ann Arbor, Michigan. In 2017 it was announced that Dutch Egyptologist Nico Staring had identified an object from the collection with an object presumed lost from the Egyptian Museum of Berlin. The fragmentary stela must have been looted from the museum after its bombardment and had been sold to Goudsmit in 1945. It was returned to Berlin in April 2017.

Goudsmit became a corresponding member of the Royal Netherlands Academy of Arts and Sciences in 1939, though he resigned the next year. He was readmitted in 1950. He was elected to the United States National Academy of Sciences in 1947, the American Philosophical Society in 1952, American Academy of Arts and Sciences in 1964.

=== Marriages and children ===
Goudsmit married Jaantje Logher, in 1927. Their daughter, Esther Marianne Goudsmit was born in 1933 in Ann Arbor, Michigan. In 1964 she earned a PhD in Zoology from the University of Michigan, and in 1972 became a Professor of Biology at Oakland University, Rochester, Michigan. She retired in 1995.

Samuel and Jaantje divorced in 1960, and in the same year Goudsmit married Irene Bejach. Like Goudsmit's parents, Irene's father, a German medical doctor and Berlin public health official, Curt Dietrich Bejach, had been murdered by the Nazis. He perished at the Auschwitz concentration camp.

Irene and her sister, Helga, left Germany for the United Kingdom as children shortly prior to the outbreak of World War II. They were evacuated as part of the Kindertransport programme, and lived for seven years in the Attenborough family home.

== Works ==
- Goudsmit, Samuel A. (1996). Alsos. With a new introduction by David Cassidy. Woodbury, New York: AIP Press. ISBN 1-56396-415-5.
- Goudsmit, †S. A. (1981). "The Backview of Human Figures in Ancient Egyptian Art". Journal of Near Eastern Studies. 40 (1): 43–46. doi:10.1086/372838. JSTOR 544421.
- Goudsmit, S. A. (1974). "An Illiterate Scribe". American Journal of Archaeology. 78 (1): 78. doi:10.2307/503765. JSTOR 503765.
- Goudsmit, S. A. (1972). "Not for the Art Trade" (PDF). Expedition. No. Summer 1972. pp. 13–16.
- Goudsmit, Samuel A.; Claiborne, Robert (1966). Time. Time-Life Science Library. New York: Time-Life Books.
- Goudsmit, S.; Saunderson, J. L. (1940). "Multiple Scattering of Electrons". Physical Review. 57 (1). American Physical Society: 24–29. Bibcode:1940PhRv...57...24G. doi:10.1103/physrev.57.24.
