= Drazhevo =

Drazhevo Дражево
- Village
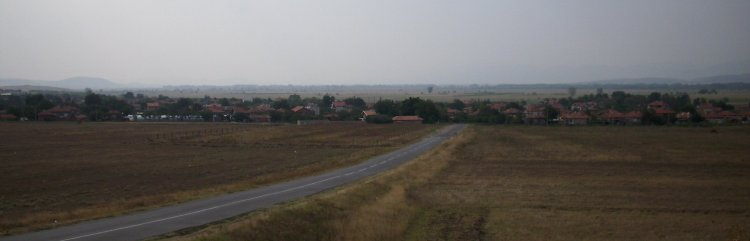

- Location within Bulgaria
- Coordinates: 42°33′N 26°27′E
- Country: Bulgaria
- Province: Yambol
- Municipality: Tundzha
- Established: Pre-historic
- Postal code: 8634
- Website: http://drazhevo.co.nf/zeml.html

Drazhevo (Bulgarian: Дражево, also transliterated: Drajevo) is a village in the southeast of Bulgaria, located in the Tundzha Municipality of the Yambol Province. It is situated in the Sliven Valley near the Tundzha river, near forest areas 9 km (6 mi) away from the city of Yambol, 17 km (11 mi) away from the city of Sliven, and 51 km (32 mi) away from the town of Elhovo. Drazhevo borders the villages of Hadzhidimitrovo, Krushare (Sliven Province), Zhelyu Voyvoda (Sliven Province), Kabile and the city of Yambol. There is a medical centre, post office, several shops and cafés and has regular bus connections to the town of Yambol.

== History ==
Tonzos river valley (now Tundzha) was inhabited by Thracian tribes in the Bronze and Iron Age. The especially favourable location, which attracted settlers as early as the Stone-Copper Age, is the bight Tonzos, around the last hill Zaychi vrah of the Sredna Gora mountain range. It is where the river changes its flow from the east to south, towards "Uskudama, Adrianopolis"(modern-day Edirne). On its way to Aegean Sea, the river merges with the rivers Maritsa and Arda. At the end of the II mil. at the foot of the tip, is formed the city of Kabile - a part of the Roman province of Thrace. Under the Avary's attacks the city was destroyed during the 6th century.

The village Drazhevo has ancient beginnings. This is evident by pottery remains from an ancient Thracian settlement discovered northeast of the village huddled at the foot of the peak "Zajchi vrah". Excavations in 2004 at the hill "Dyado Sabev bair", which is located right next to the hill "Zajchi vrah", opened a unique tumulus, (or burial mound), of the Yamna culture. These people were steppe nomads from the second level of the Early Bronze Age.

The first mention of the village of Drazhevo was in 1666 in the old Ottoman document as Ohada (Awhdy). By this time, the watercourse of the river Tonzos (Tunja) had been already moved 2–3 km in north. The old river bed had been covered with dense forest, which people called Kara orman (Montenegro). Old people of the village still remember the forest, part of which was kept to the end of Ottoman rule, when it was cut and turned into fields. They say that the northern part of the village has ended with a fence - a precaution against wild animals. Later people started to call the old bed of the river "Tundzhalak" due to the sand in the soil. (There is only sand in some places). Ground water is very close to the surface and is potable. After 1944 the land was nationalized and turned into rice paddies

During the Ottoman rule in the village was settled moderately wealthy Turk named Atla grazing, who kept breeding horses. The people of his village had been committed as apprentices in keeping the horses. At that time the houses in the number of the houses in the village was around 17. At that time, the village began to be called Atliy (from Turkish "at" - horse).

From the beginning until now the population of Drazhevo had been dealing with livestock (sheep, horses, buffaloes and cows) and horticulture. Traditional horticultural crops were wheat, barley and rye. The planting of crop vegetables started much later. Old people from the village say that in the past, the vegetables had been purchased from "bachvandzhii" - gardeners from the Balkans. People had used their yards around the house as a stackyard - a place where the harvest was threshing in the past with "dikanya".

In the 19th century, the detachment of Panayot Hitov acted in the land of the village. After the liberation of Bulgaria in 1878, the population of the village was increased by a significant number of refugees from Turkish Thrace. Till the 1885 Bulgarian Crisis, the village of Atliy was a part of Eastern Rumelia. In 1890, for unclear reasons, the village was renamed as the village Borissovo - the name of King Boris I by the decree No. 582. In the archives of Dr. Tabakov from Sliven, it was noted that during 30 years of the 20th century, in the village were 104 houses with 461 inhabitants.

By decree No. 45 of the National Assembly on February 8, 1950, the village was renamed Drazhevo - the name of George Drazhev, the chairman of Revolutionary Committee during the April Uprising for the Yambol region, who was hanged on a bridge in the town of Yambol named "Kargonskiya".
