= MapKit =

Apple framework for maps and location services

MapKit is Apple’s framework for integrating maps and location-based features into apps. Introduced in iOS 3.0, it enables developers to display Apple Maps within their applications and overlay custom content like pins, shapes, routes, or search results. It is used across nearly all Apple operating systems — iOS, macOS, watchOS, tvOS, iPadOS, and visionOS—providing a consistent mapping experience throughout the Apple ecosystem.

== Functions and capabilities ==
At its core, MapKit connects with Apple Maps to display geographic data in a way that feels native to Apple devices. Developers can embed maps into their apps, adjust how they look, respond to user gestures like zooming or panning, and integrate rich data overlays like polylines, polygons, or annotations. For instance, you can show a route between two points, highlight a service area, or let users tap on map markers for more info.

MapKit also supports powerful geolocation features. Through integration with Core Location, apps can access the user’s location (with permission), track movement, or react to geofences. On top of that, the framework provides geocoding (converting addresses to coordinates) and reverse geocoding (turning coordinates into human-readable locations). Developers can also take advantage of search features, offering place suggestions or detailed results, all using Apple’s data.

In areas with high-resolution data, MapKit includes support for 3D Flyover and the immersive “Look Around” street-level experience, which brings cities to life with realistic visuals and smooth transitions. These features are available on newer Apple devices and in select cities around the world. One of Apple’s strong points is privacy, and MapKit aligns with that. Apps can use mapping and location services without tracking users across other apps or collecting unnecessary data. For web developers, there’s MapKit JS, a JavaScript version of the framework. It allows developers to embed interactive Apple Maps on websites, similar to how Google Maps APIs work. MapKit JS uses a server-signed token (JWT) to authenticate, and Apple offers generous usage limits under a free tier for developers.
