= Bolyarsko =

- Location of Okop
- Coordinates: 42°25′54″N 26°21′11″E
- Country: Bulgaria
- Provinces (Oblast): Yambol
- Elevation: 141 m (463 ft)

Population (2011)
  - Total: 327
- Time zone: UTC+2 (EET)
  - Summer (DST): UTC+3 (EEST)
- Postal Code: 8631
- Area code: 04710

Bolyarsko (Bulgarian: Болярско; Turkish: Emirli) - a village in South-Eastern Bulgaria in the Yambol Province, in the Tundzha Municipality. According to the National Institute of Statistics, in the year of 2011, the village had 327 inhabitants. The Holy Assembly Council takes place on 24 May.
