= Boyadzhik =

- Location of Kukorevo
- Coordinates: 42.3972°N 26.3024°E
- Country: Bulgaria
- Provinces (Oblast): Yambol
- Elevation: 153 m (502 ft)

Population (2021)
  - Total: 1,124
- Time zone: UTC+2 (EET)
  - Summer (DST): UTC+3 (EEST)

Boyadzhik (Bulgarian: Бояджик) is a village in Tundzha Municipality of Yambol Province, Bulgaria. Situated 22 km west of the city of Yambol, and 8 km southwest of the Bulgarian Air Force's Bezmer Air Base, at an elevation 153 m. Population 1,124. It is the birthplace of Ivan Atanasov, the father of John Vincent Atanasoff.

Boyadzhik was the site of a massacre of 145 innocent Bulgarian civilians committed by irregular Ottoman troops (bashi-bazouk) on 11 May 1876.

The massacre took place in the wake of the Bulgarian April Uprising, even though Boyadzhik did not participate in the insurrection and was located hundreds of kilometres away from the scene of any hostilities. The grandfather of the inventor of the first electronic digital computer, John Vincent Atanasoff, was among the victims.

== See also ==
- List of villages in Yambol Province
