= Botevo =

Botevo may refer to the following villages in Bulgaria, most named after Hristo Botev:

- Botevo, Montana Province
- Botevo, Varna Province
- Botevo, Vidin Province
- Botevo, Vratsa Province
- Botevo, Yambol Province
