= Dryanovo, Yambol Province =

Village in Yambol, Bulgaria

Dryanovo
- Location of Dryanovo
- Coordinates: 42.2500000°N 26.5170002°E
- Country: Bulgaria
- Provinces (Oblast): Yambol
- Elevation: 150 m (490 ft)

Population (2013)
  - Total: 102
- Time zone: UTC+2 (EET)
  - Summer (DST): UTC+3 (EEST)

Dryanovo (Bulgarian: Дряново) is a village in Tundzha Municipality of Yambol Province, Bulgaria. Situated 266.83 km west of the city of Sofia.
