= Kukorevo =

- Location of Kukorevo
- Coordinates: 42.4471°N 26.5334°E
- Country: Bulgaria
- Provinces (Oblast): Yambol
- Elevation: 137.95 m (452.6 ft)

Population (2021)
  - Total: 1,515
- Time zone: UTC+2 (EET)
  - Summer (DST): UTC+3 (EEST)

Kukorevo (Bulgarian: Кукорево) - a village in South-Eastern Bulgaria in the Yambol Province, in the Tundzha Municipality. The city contains a school; a community center; a church; a city hall; a kindergarten, a club for senior citizens; a football team; a history museum; an art gallery; a planetarium; as well as a folklore group.

In the village, an annual folk wrestling event is also held.
