= Cabyle =

Town in the interior of ancient Thrace

- Кабиле (Bulgarian)
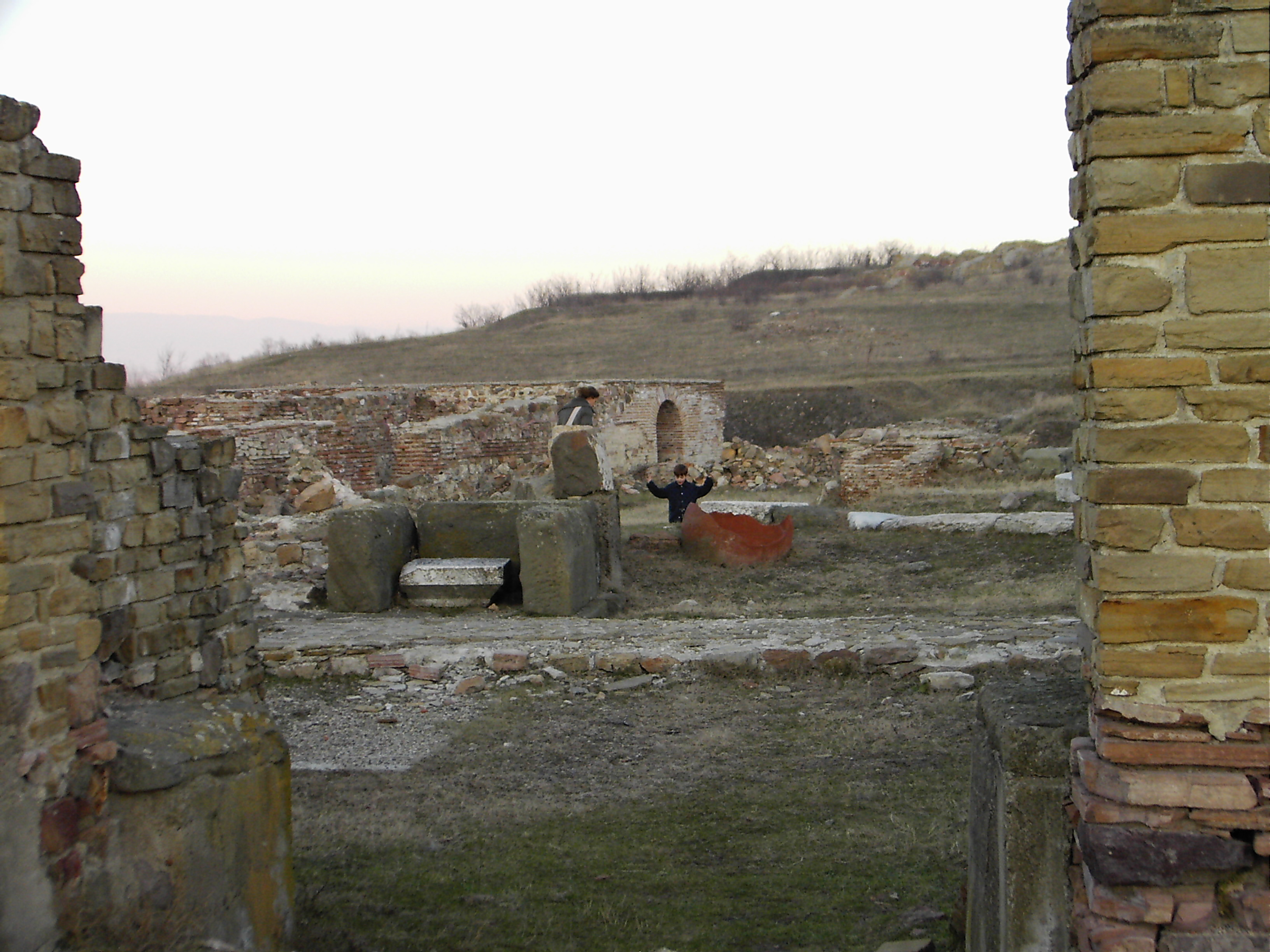

- Location within Bulgaria
- 42°33′02″N 26°29′03″E
- Type: Settlement
- Periods: Iron Age
- Cultures: Thracian
- Location: Yambol Province

History
- Built: 1000–800 BC
- Abandoned: Unknown

Site notes
- Area: 650 acres (260 ha)
- Archaeologists: Velizar Velkov; Mechislav Domaradzky
- Public access: Yes

Cabyle or Kabile (Ancient Greek: Καβύλη), also known as Calybe or Kalibe (Καλύβη), is a town in the interior of ancient Thrace, west of Develtus, on the river Tonsus. The town later bore the names of Diospolis (Διὸς Πόλις), and Goloë (Γολόη).

== Name ==
The acropolis of the ancient city was located in the most eastern part of Zaichi peak. Its entrance in the south was a gate cut into the rocks and on one of these rocks there's a carved relief image of Cybele, the Great Mother of the Gods. Considering that this is the Phrygian name of the goddess, according to Prof. Velizar Velkov, it can be assumed that the pronunciation of the name in the ancient Thracian language was Cabyle.

== History ==
Cabyle used to be one of the most important centers of south-eastern Thrace. It was established around 2000 BC on the Zaychi Vrah Heights.

In 341 BC Cabyle was conquered by the army of Philip II of Macedon and was later included in the Empire of Alexander of Macedon. It was colonised by Philip with rebellious Macedonians. In the 3rd century BC it was governed again by the Thracians. The town was a major trade and military center between the 3rd and the 2nd centuries BC. The town is noted by numerous ancient authors including Demosthenes, Polybius, Strabo, Pliny the Elder, and Stephanus of Byzantium.

In 71 BC the city was conquered by the Roman Republic by the troops of Marcus Lucullus and after 45 BC it was included in the Roman client state of the Sapaean Thracian kingdom, and after 46 AD in the province of Thracia. Cabyle was one of the most important cities of Thrace following the reforms of Emperor Diocletian in 4th century AD.

In late 4th century Cabyle was seized by the Goths. It was finally destroyed by the Avars and never settled again. During the Middle Ages there was a small settlement located in the territory of the ancient city.

== Archaeology ==
Its site is located near the modern village of Kabile, less than 10 kilometres (6.2 mi) away from Yambol, south-eastern Bulgaria. It was proclaimed part of the 100 Tourist Sites of Bulgaria. The territory of the city and the surrounding area was proclaimed a territory of national importance in 1965 and converted to an archaeological reserve. The area of the reserve is around 65 km^{2}.

Many of the findings are housed in the onsite museum which also includes an exhibition tracking the excavation history of the site.

== Titular see ==
Under the name of Diospolis in Thracia, it remains a titular see of the Roman Catholic Church.
