= Kabile =

Village in Yambol, Bulgaria

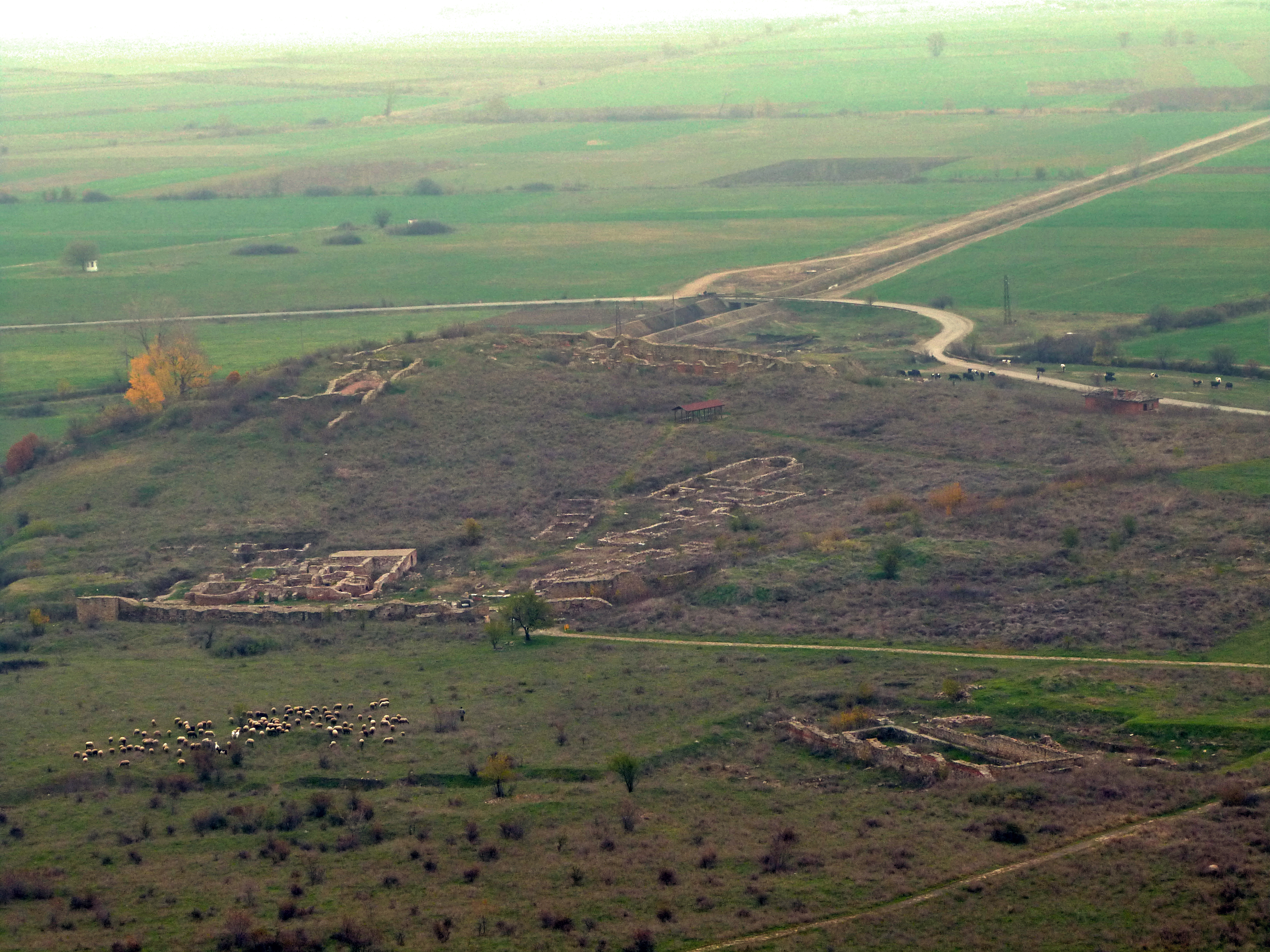

- Location of Kabile
- Coordinates: 42°32′N 26°29′E
- Country: Bulgaria
- Provinces (Oblast): Yambol
- Elevation: 129 m (423 ft)
- Time zone: UTC+2 (EET)
  - Summer (DST): UTC+3 (EEST)
- Postal Code: 8629
- Area code: 04712, +359-4712

Kabile (Bulgarian: Кабиле) or Cabyle is a village in southeastern Bulgaria, part of the Tundzha municipality, Yambol Province.

The ancient Thracian city of Kabile was one of the most important and largest towns in Thrace and its architectural remains are impressive, many of them preserved and restored.

The territory of the ancient city and the surrounding area was proclaimed a territory of national importance and an archaeological reserve in 1965.

Many of the finds are housed in the on-site museum.

== Geography ==
Kabile village is located in the southernmost reaches of the Sliven Valley some 3 km northwest of Yambol. Zaychi vrah, the last hill of the Sredna Gora mountain range, can be found 1.5 km north of Kabile. The road from Yambol to the village of Zhelyu Voyvoda (in the Sliven Province) passes through Kabile, as well as the road from Yambol to the village of Drazhevo.

The name of the city originates from Cybele.

Ancient Kabyle was at an important crossroads through antiquity. From here the road from Aenus (Thrace) (today's Enez) led to Hemus (Stara Planina) and the lower Danube, as well as the diagonal road (Via Diagonalis) from Byzantium through Serdica (Sofia) to the middle Danube.

== History ==
Roman fort

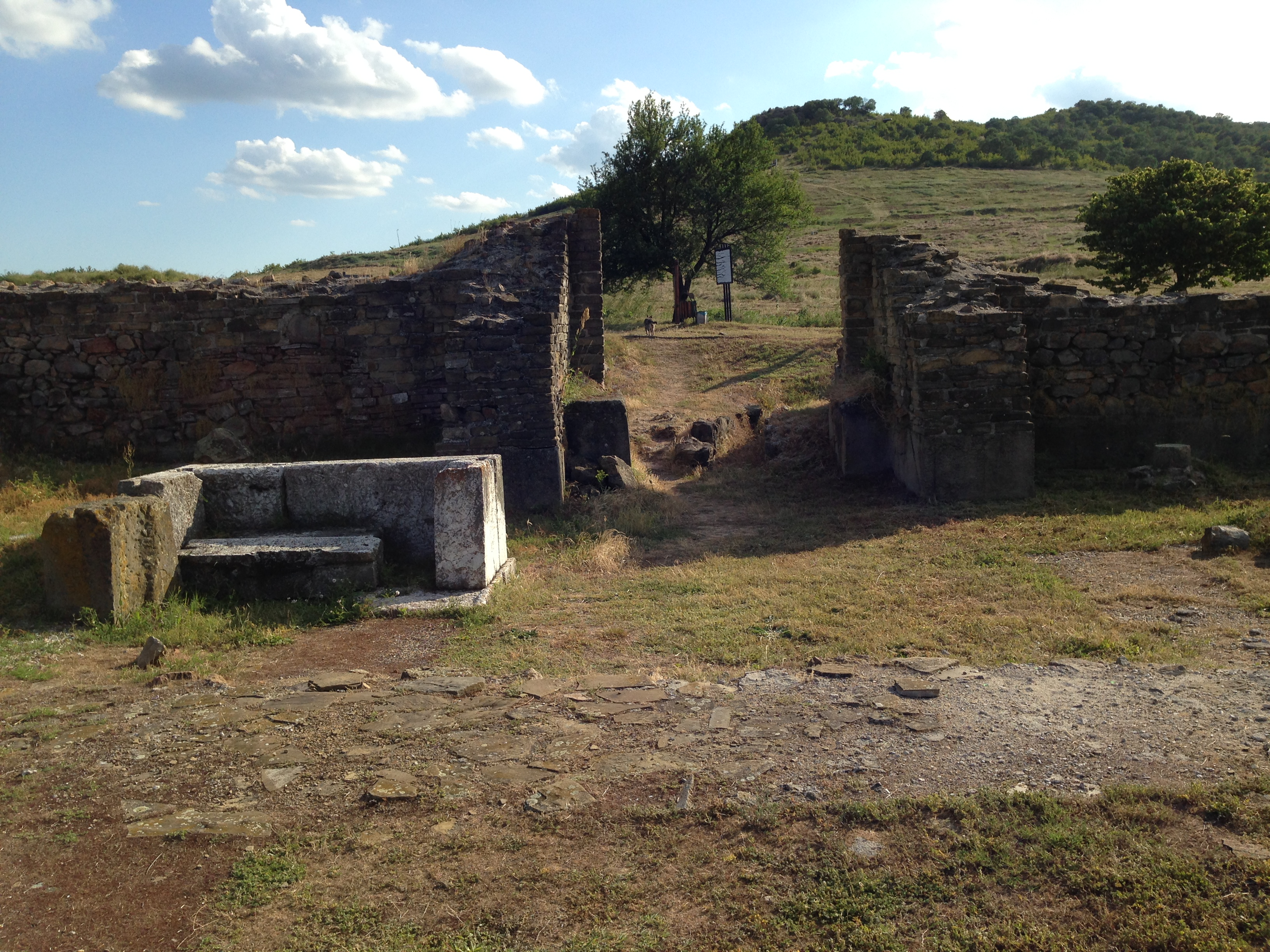
Inside of fort gate

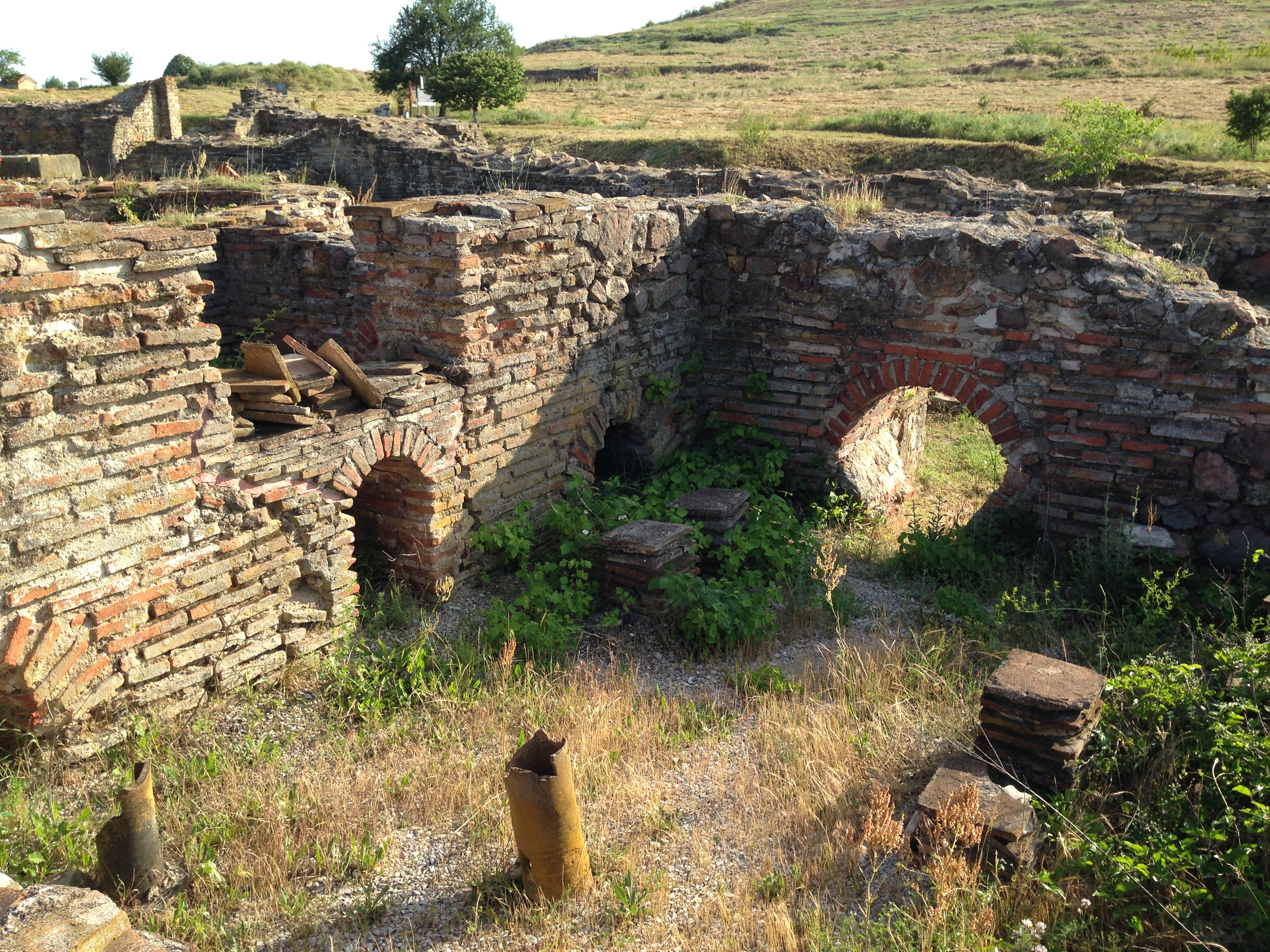
Large (military) baths

=== Early history ===
The site was inhabited since the 2nd millennium BC and traces of a Neolithic culture have been unearthed. Ceramics discovered from the 10th to the 6th century BC prove that the site was inhabited during the early Iron Age as well.

In 341 BC, the town was founded or refounded by Philip II of Macedon, who fortified it; subsequently, the town became a polis. It was under the rule of Alexander the Great and Lysimachus until 280 BC, when in 279 BC it briefly fell under the control of King Cavarus of the Celtic Kingdom of Tylis and the city minted coins on behalf of Cavarus. In about 277 BC it came under the control of the Thracian Odrysian kingdom and was one of the kings' residences. The so-called "great inscription" of Seuthopolis testifies to the importance of Kabyle in these times.

The city was a major trade and military centre between the 3rd and the 2nd century BC. However, its activities later waned due to aggressive campaigns by Philip V of Macedon.

=== Roman History ===
In 71 BC, it became part of the Roman Empire after being conquered by Marcus Lucullus and after 45 BC it was included in the Roman province of Thracia. Part of the site was occupied by a fort, one of the largest in the region. From discovered inscriptions, the cohort II Lucensium, from Abritus and consisting of nominally 480 foot soldiers and 120 cavalry, was stationed in the fort from 136 (under Hadrian) to 192 AD and built the associated thermae in 166 to 169. After their move to Germania (Sapareva Banya) they were replaced by the cohort I Atoitorum from 192 AD.

The city was badly damaged by in the Gothic Wars in 267–9. Nevertheless, the city and the fort were soon rebuilt, as many towns in the region were under Diocletian, and in 293 it became a city again. A castellum of 5 hectares replaced the earlier military camp, a new fort wall was built with square towers, and the city wall and the large 3rd century thermae of the fort were restored. The large and elaborate tribunorum for about 12 officers and dating from the early 270s was excavated in 2017 and a recently translated inscription shows another larger cohort (milliaria) with about 800 foot soldiers was present. New large public buildings were built and Kabyle became one of the most important cities of Thracia following the reforms of Emperor Diocletian.

Christianity became widespread in the area as early as the 4th century AD, and Kabyle became a bishopric with a large basilica.

In 378, Kabyle was seized by the Goths under Fritigernus. In the 5th century repeated barbarian raids forced the inhabitants to retreat inside the fort. The fort wall was doubled in the most vulnerable places and the thermae were used as residences and many other houses were built. The town was finally destroyed in about 587 by the Avars and only partially settled afterwards.

In the 9th century, the surrounding region was fully integrated into the Bulgarian Empire and a small Bulgarian settlement was established over the ancient ruins.

== Site ==
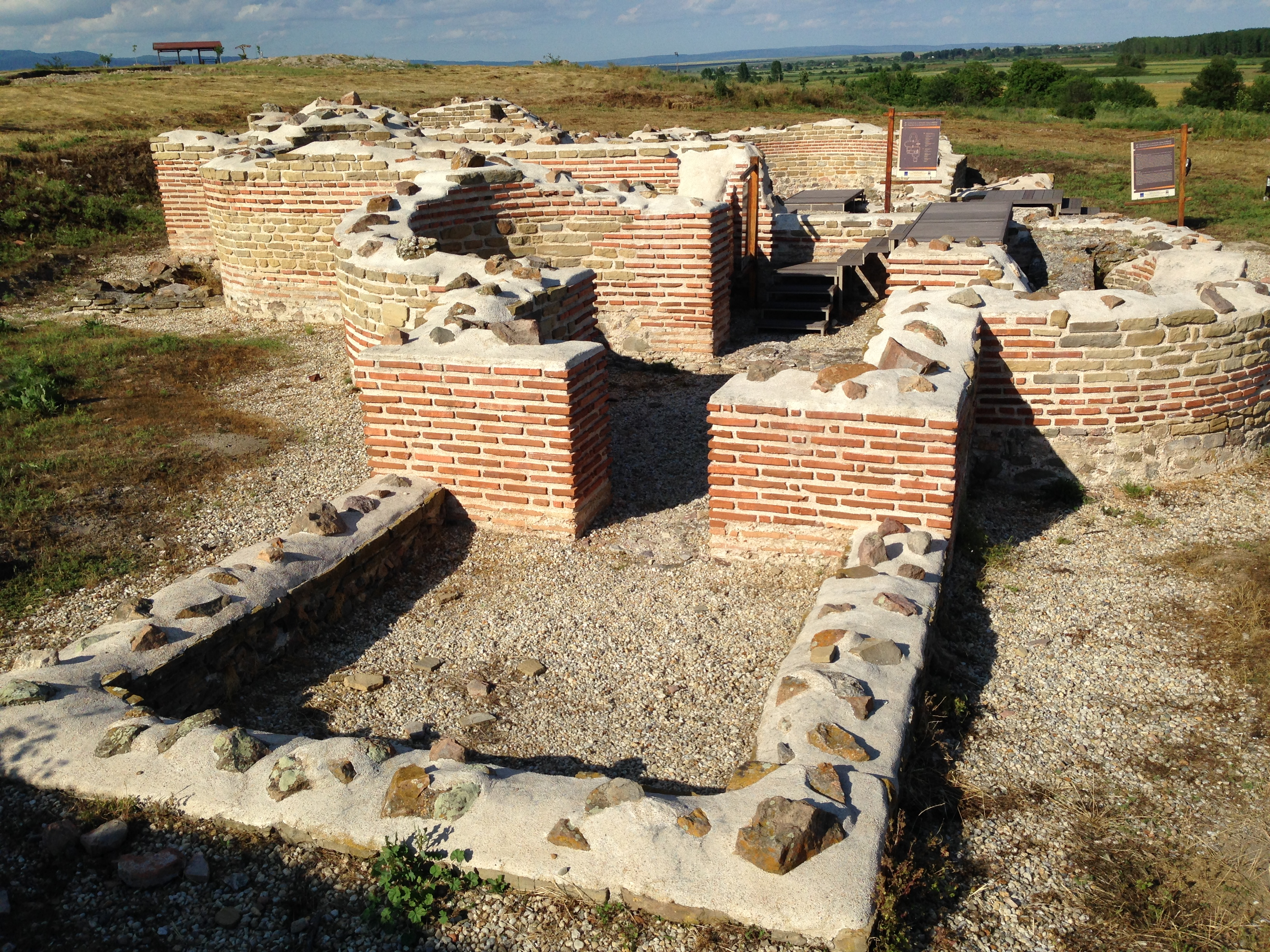
Civilian baths

The ancient city has been partially excavated and work is continuing. In 2018, the principia of the Roman fort have been discovered.

The Hellenistic city had defensive walls from the last quarter of the 4th century BC, an agora and temples to Jupiter Dolichenus, the Thracian Horseman, Asclepius and Hygia. It has an acropolis with a sanctuary and relief of Cybele, its namesake and patron deity, carved into the rock.

The military fort occupied part of the city from Roman times, including the later barracks (one for cavalry) and large thermal baths.

Smaller thermal baths lie inside the civilian town dating initially from the early 1st century BC and were at first associated with a palaestra.

The large Christian basilica and smaller later one inside the fort have been partially restored.

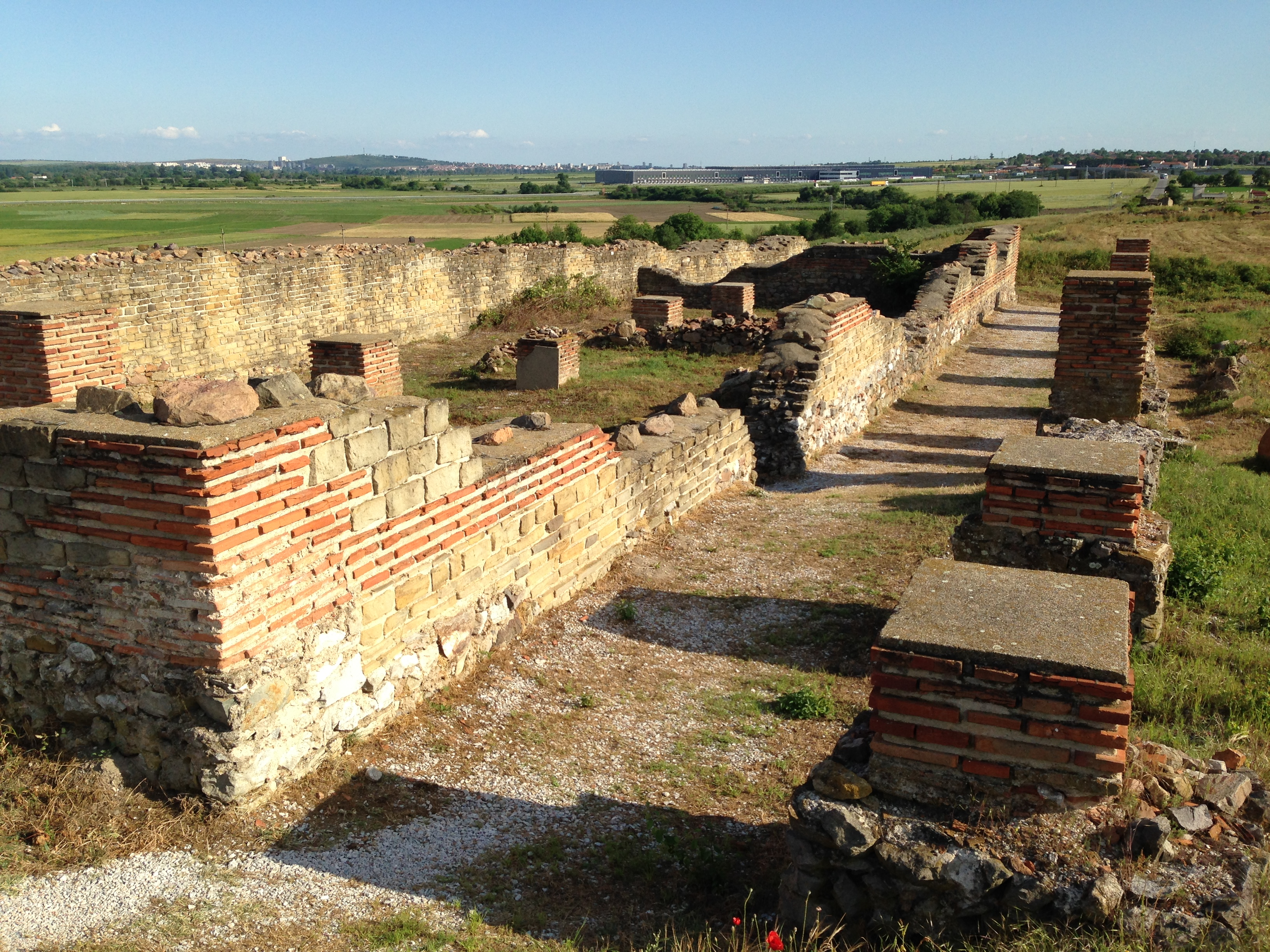
Cavalry barracks

=== The Large Basilica ===
The bishop's basilica was built in the 340's as one of the earliest examples of one with a courtyard in the region. It was damaged in 377–8 in the invasions. It was rebuilt and enlarged in the early 5th century and became the 2nd biggest in Thracia, complete with mosaic floors, until its destruction in 587. It was partially rebuilt again until abandonment in the early 7th century.

== Honour ==
Kabile Island off Greenwich Island in the South Shetland Islands, Antarctica is named after Kabile.
