= Bezmer, Yambol Province =

Village in Yambol Province, Bulgaria

Coordinates: 42°29′N 26°24′E

Bezmer (Bulgarian: Безмер; Turkish: Hamzaören) is a village (село) in southeastern Bulgaria, located in the Tundzha Municipality (Община Тунджа) of the Yambol Province (Област Ямбол). It is located 10 km (6 mi) west of the town of Yambol. The village hosts the Bezmer Air Base, a joint facility of the Bulgarian Air Force and the USAF.
