= Hanovo =

- Location of Hanovo
- Coordinates: 42.3918°N 26.5104°E
- Country: Bulgaria
- Provinces (Oblast): Yambol
- Elevation: 150 m (490 ft)

Population (2021)
  - Total: 568
- Time zone: UTC+2 (EET)
  - Summer (DST): UTC+3 (EEST)

Hanovo (Bulgarian: Дряново) is a village in Tundzha Municipality of Yambol Province, Bulgaria. Situated 263.612 km east of the city of Sofia.
