= Okop, Yambol Province =

Okop
- Location of Okop
- Coordinates: 42°24′37″N 26°32′28″E
- Country: Bulgaria
- Provinces (Oblast): Yambol

Government
  - Mayor: Georgi Georgiev
- Elevation: 114 m (374 ft)

Population
  - Total: 599
- Time zone: UTC+2 (EET)
  - Summer (DST): UTC+3 (EEST)
- Postal Code: 8669
- Area code: 04773

Okop (Bulgarian: Окоп) - a village in South-Eastern Bulgaria in the Yambol Province, in the Tundzha Municipality. According to the National Institute of Statistics, in the year of 2016, the village had 599 inhabitants. The Holy Assembly Council takes place on 24 May.
