= Tundzha Municipality =

Tundzha Municipality Община Тунджа
- Municipality
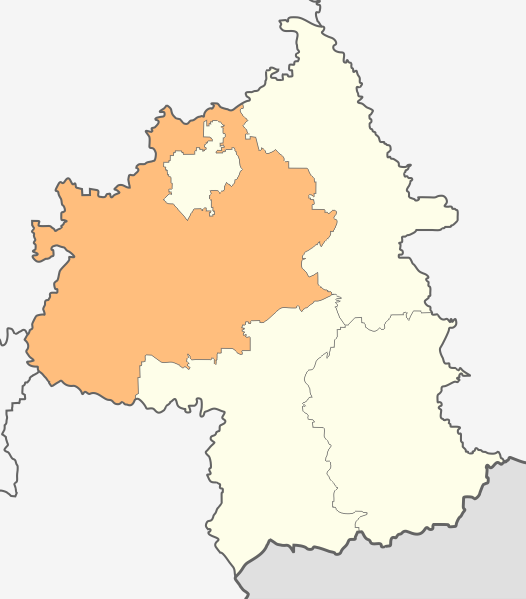
- Coordinates: 42°19′N 26°29′E
- Country: Bulgaria
- Province: Yambol
- Seat: Yambol (outside the municipality)

Area
  - Total: 1,218.86 km^{2} (470.60 sq mi)

Population (2019)
  - Total: 21,435
  - Density: 17.586/km^{2} (45.548/sq mi)

Tundzha Municipality (Bulgarian: община Тунджа) is a municipality of Yambol Province, southeastern Bulgaria. The municipality has an area of 1,218.86 square kilometres, making it the second-largest by area in the country after the Capital Municipality (i.e. the city of Sofia). It covers 44 villages and has a population of 21,435 according to 2005 data. All the villages in the province are administratively equal, and the administrative centre of the municipality is located in the provincial capital of Yambol, which is not part of Tundzha municipality itself: the city is equivalent to Yambol Municipality, which is an enclave within Tundzha Municipality. Tundzha municipality is named after the Tundzha River, the most significant tributary of the Maritsa.

The following villages are part of Tundzha Municipality:

- Asenovo
- Bezmer
- Bolyarsko
- Botevo
- Boyadzhik
- Chargan
- Chelnik
- Drazhevo
- Drama
- Dryanovo
- Hadzhi Dimitrovo
- Hanovo
- General Inzovo
- General Toshevo
- Golyam Manastir
- Galabintsi
- Kabile
- Kalchevo
- Karavelovo
- Kozarevo
- Konevets
- Krumovo
- Kukorevo
- Malomir
- Meden Kladenets
- Mezhda
- Miladinovtsi
- Mogila
- Okop
- Ovchi Kladenets
- Pobeda
- Robovo
- Roza
- Savino
- Simeonovo
- Skalitsa
- Slamino
- Stara Reka
- Tarnava
- Tenevo
- Veselinovo
- Vidintsi
- Zavoy
- Zlatari

A notable native is Ivan Atanasov, the father of John Vincent Atanasoff (1903–1995), Bulgarian American physicist and inventor of the first automatic electronic digital computer. He was born in Boyadzhik. The Bezmer Air Base, one of the joint US-Bulgarian military bases, is also located in the municipality, near the villages of Bezmer and Bolyarsko.

== Demography ==
=== Religion ===
According to the latest Bulgarian census of 2011, the religious composition, among those who answered the optional question on religious identification, was the following:

Religious composition of Tundzha Municipality
Orthodox Christianity	81.8%
Catholicism	0.6%
Protestantism	2.6%
Islam	0.5%
No religion	7.6%
Prefer not to answer, others and indefinable	10.1%
