= Asenovo =

Asenovo (Bulgarian: Асеново) may refer to several villages in Bulgaria:

- Asenovo, Pleven Province
- Asenovo, Veliko Tarnovo Province
- Asenovo, Yambol Province
