= Flyover (Apple Maps) =

3D Apple Maps feature

- Flyover showing Toronto on the iPad Pro
- Release: September 19, 2012; 14 years ago
- Platform: iOS iPadOS macOS
- Available in: Multiple languages

Flyover is a feature on Apple Maps that allows users to view select areas in a 3D setting. Flyover also formerly allowed users to take "tours" of these locations through the City Tours feature, showcasing various landmarks in the area, however this feature was removed in 2025. Imagery is provided through the use of planes, which collect fine data on buildings. Flyover is available on all Apple devices which also support Maps, including iOS and macOS.

Initially founded in 2012, along with Apple Maps itself, Flyover has expanded from its initial 10 locations in the US and Europe to now include over 300 cities, landmarks, and parks across all six inhabited continents through a series of multiple expansions, notably in 2014, 2019 and 2024. Upon release, Flyover was criticized for various visual issues, as part of a larger criticism of the overall release of Apple Maps, however, Flyover has also been praised for its detail and uniqueness.

Similarly to Google Earth, the implementation of Flyover has been prevented in certain areas primarily due to security concerns over the collection of data in sensitive locations, notably in Norway in 2012.

== History ==
=== Pre-2012 ===
In anticipation of the creation of a 3D mapping service that would eventually become Maps, Apple acquired Poly9, a Canadian 3D mapping company, in mid-2010, two years before launching Flyover. Poly9, like Apple, was an early competitor to Google Earth, containing similar features to the company, particularly a 3D globe dubbed the "Poly Globe". In August of the same year, Apple was also revealed to be the buyer of C3 Technologies, a Sweden-based company which also specialized in 3D imagery, which the company collected aerially. C3 was originally built off military technology developed by Swedish defense company Saab AB, which allowed the company to collect higher-quality imagery than traditional civilian companies. In addition to Flyover, C3 also assisted with other Maps features, including traffic data and Wikipedia entries for cities and places of interest. The acquisition of both companies led to speculation that Apple would create a mapping service separate from Google Maps, as well as a mapping service which could compete with Google Earth.

=== 2012–2015 ===
Flyover was announced along with Apple Maps at the 2012 World Wide Developers Conference, and both were released in September 2012. Upon release, Flyover was only available in the iPhone 4s, iPad 2 and the 3rd generation iPad. The 10 initial cities that first received Flyover were Chicago, Copenhagen, Las Vegas, Los Angeles, Miami, Montreal, Sacramento, San Francisco, Seattle and Sydney. More cities would receive Flyover in later years, with Apple often adding multiple cities to Flyover at a time. In addition to this initial release, more cities were added later in 2012, including Toronto in Canada. In December, Lyon received full coverage.

In 2013, Flyover was added to Paris in May, as well as to smaller cities such as Indianapolis and Baltimore, totaling 16 cities in the United States, Germany, Canada, France and the UK, alongside coverage being expanded in several existing areas. In addition, Flyover was also added to London, Barcelona, Cologne, Rome, Madrid and Vancouver. In September, Flyover was released to Bordeaux, followed by Saint-Étienne in November.

Flyover was added to several cities and national parks in New Zealand, France, the United States, South Africa, Sweden and Japan, including Cape Town and two Arizona National Parks in 2014, with Marseille, the second-largest city in France receiving Flyover coverage later in the year as well and Aix-en-Provence. The capital of Japan, Tokyo, also received Flyover that year, along with Wellington, New Zealand and Yosemite National Park. In addition to adding new areas, the coverage of existing cities with the feature was expanded. In San Francisco, Flyover was added across the San Francisco Bay to Berkeley. In March, Apple added Flyover to Saint-Tropez, Perth and Cordoba. In mid-2014, the City Tours feature, which allows users to tour locations supported by the Flyover feature, was publicly released. In November, several cities received Flyover, those being Nice, Menton, Montpellier and Monaco. In December, Flyover was added to the cities of Strasbourg, Dijon, Millau, Turin, Rotterdam, Malmö, Avignon, Biarritz and Perpignan.

Flyover was added to over 20 cities and locations in 2015 in various cities mostly across the US and Western Europe, including Canberra and Venice. Flyover was also added to Budapest, in Hungary and Prague in the Czech Republic later in the year. In Italy, the cities of Florence and Genoa received Flyover. Guadalajara, the largest city in Mexico to have the feature, also received Flyover. Japan also saw more cities with Flyover, with Nagoya, Osaka and Hiroshima being added, and Mannheim, Stuttgart and Neuschwanstein Castle in Germany also received Flyover that year. In January, Apple added Flyover to Beziers and Clermont-Ferrand. In April, Flyover was added to 20 locations around the world, those being Arches National Park, Badajoz, Bari, Belfast, Canberra, Chambord, Châteauneuf-du-Pape, Chichen Itza, Coimbra, Culiacán, Durban, Huelva, Le Mans, Mont Saint-Michel, Montpellier, Nelson, Nîmes, Paestum, Reims and Teotihuacán. Flyover was added An additional 7 cities received Flyover in June 2015, those being the cities of Karlsruhe and Kiel in Germany, Braga in Portugal, San Juan in Puerto Rico, Cádiz and Jerez de la Frontera in Spain, and Kingston upon Hull in the United Kingdom.

=== 2016–present ===
In February 2016, Apple added Flyover to 20 additional locations in Australia, France, Switzerland, Germany, the US, the Netherlands, Japan, South Africa, Italy, Austria, and the Virgin Islands, those being Adelaide, Amiens, La Rochelle, Nantes, Toulouse, Berne, Bremen, Columbus, Louisville, South Bend, Springfield, Tucson, Dresden, Eindhoven, Johannesburg, Middlesbrough, Salzburg, Taormina, Toyoma. In March, Augsburg, Braunschweig, Hanover, Newcastle upon Tyne and Niigata received Flyover.

January 2019 saw one of Apple's largest Flyover expansions, with the feature being added to 51 cities in France, Japan, the United States, and elsewhere, including Albuquerque, Cincinnati and Key West as well as the entirety of the nation of Monaco.

In September 2020, Flyover was added to the city of Amsterdam, in the Netherlands. In June 2022, Flyover was added to Vienna in Austria.

Another major rollout of Flyover occurred in 2024, with dozens of cities across North America, Australia, and Europe receiving the feature, including Washington D.C., Kansas City, and Brisbane, as well as smaller cities, including Chattanooga, Birmingham, Alabama and St. George.

These updates continued into 2025, with Lisbon, Frankfurt and several other cities receiving Flyover. In July 2025, Flyover was added to the cities of Brasília and Ouro Preto in Brazil, marking the first Brazilian and the first South American cities to receive Flyover. In September, Le Havre and Dunkirk received Flyover. Flyover was again expanded to several cities in Europe and Australia, including Bilbao, in October. In November, Flyover was added to the cities of Plzeň in the Czech Republic, Stavanger in Norway, Logroño and Vitoria-Gasteiz in Spain, Lucerne in Switzerland, and Newbury in the United Kingdom. In December, Flyover was added to Zurich in Switzerland.

In January 2026, Flyover was added to the cities of Caen in France and Wolfsburg in Germany, as well as the cities of Belo Horizonte in Brazil and Nijmegen in the Netherlands later that month. In February and March, Flyover was added to the cities of Mulhouse and Thionville in France. In July 2026, Apple began rolling out higher-quality AI-enhanced imagery in a beta version of Maps in several select cities, including London and New York. In September 2026, Flyover was added to the cities of Salvador, Fortaleza, Belem in Brazil and Chambéry and Boulogne-sur-Mer in France. In November, as part of a larger update for the country, several cities in India, including Hyderabad, received Flyover, alongside cities such as São Paulo, Porto Alegre, Funchal, and Juneau, Alaska.

== Use ==
Apple collects the 3D data used for Flyover through the use of small military-grade drone-like planes equipped with cameras, which fly up close to buildings to create a more detailed map. The cameras are positioned at designated angles to capture rooftops, edges and sides of buildings, trees, and other visible objects. Flyover imagery additionally collects topographical data which also appears on the software. Once collected, 3D imagery can be generated within a period of hours. As of 2013, imagery used for Flyover is collected by C3 Technologies. In June 2026, during the World Wide Developers Conference, Apple announced that Flyover imagery would be collected using artificial intelligence in addition to aerial imagery, which would allow for more detailed imagery, including light reflected from buildings.

With Flyover, certain locations – primarily big cities, landmarks and some national parks – can be viewed from a birds-eye perspective, as opposed to street level imagery provided by features such as Look Around on Apple Maps and Street View on Google Maps. The images provided are three-dimensional, photo-realistic, and users can alter the vantage point on the map through panning or zooming in or out. Imagery provided by Flyover has been viewed as similar to that of virtual reality, and it has theorized by some to be a possible precursor to a VR feature on Maps.

Flyover has been considered as a possible assister to tourism in provided cities, with a 2022 study conducted in China which utilized Flyover suggesting the feature influenced an individual's desire to travel to regions in Australia and Japan supported with the feature.

=== City Tours ===
Flyover City Tours were first released in 2014, however the feature was initially not accessible to Maps users. Shortly afterward, City Tours were leaked by a developer, who created a public video showcasing the feature in Paris. City Tours were officially announced by Apple at the 2014 World Wide Developers Conference, and were released with iOS 8. City Tours was a feature that allowed users to view various landmarks in a given city via a "flying" animation, a feature only available to cities that already contain Flyover 3D maps. City Tours was added as a feature to Apple Maps on iOS 8 on September 17, 2014, and in OS X Yosemite on October 16, 2014. City Tours were removed from Maps as part of the release of iOS 26 in September 2025, which was largely unreported on until several months after its removal.

City Tours were accessed via a button available in the search history of Maps. Flyover imagery could be viewed manually without starting the tour. Most, but not all cities with Flyover allowed tours of a given city, where the above virtual tour of various landmarks in the area will be shown.

== Coverage ==
Countries, territories, and subdivisions with 3D coverage in Apple Maps as of October 2025: Regions with partial 3D coverage Regions with full 3D coverage Regions without 3D coverage

Flyovers is available in over 350 cities, metropolitan areas, national parks and landmarks across 31 countries and all six inhabited continents, as of 2025. (Note: Note that 3D coverage is generally not limited to the cities targeted for Flyover (see below) and often covers surrounding towns and communities in the area. For example, Los Angeles has Flyover, and in addition to their coverage, all towns and places within that general area, such as San Bernardino and Riverside, also have Flyover.) Flyover is currently available in the countries of Australia, Austria, the Bahamas, Belgium, Brazil, Canada, the Czech Republic, Denmark, Finland, France, Germany, Hungary, India,, Ireland, Italy, Japan, Luxembourg, Mexico, Monaco, the Netherlands, New Zealand, Norway, Portugal, San Marino, Slovenia, South Africa, Spain, Sweden, Switzerland, the United Kingdom, the United States, and Vatican City.

Locations with Flyovers
Country	Locations
Australia	See below
Austria	Bregenz, Dornbirn, Graz, Klagenfurt, Linz, Salzburg, Vienna, Wels
Bahamas	Castaway Cay, Freeport, Nassau
Belgium	Aalst, Antwerp, Bruges, Brussels, Ghent, La Louvière, Lier, Mechelen, Mouscron
Brazil	Belém, Belo Horizonte, Brasília, Fortaleza, Ouro Preto, Porto Alegre, Salvador, São Paulo
Canada	Abbotsford, Barrie, Brampton, Calgary, Cambridge, Edmonton, Guelph, Halifax, Hamilton, Kingston, Kitchener, London, Markham, Mississauga, Moncton, Montreal, Oakville, Oshawa, Ottawa, Quebec City, Regina, Saguenay, Saskatoon, Sherbrooke, Toronto, Trois-Rivières, Vancouver, Victoria, Waterloo, Windsor, Winnipeg
Czech Republic	Brno, Kladno, Olomouc, Ostrava, Plzeň, Prague, Zlín
Denmark	Aalborg, Aarhus, Copenhagen, Odense, Roskilde
Finland	Helsinki, Jyväskylä, Lahti, Oulu, Turku
France	See below
Germany	See below
Hungary	Budapest
India	Guntur, Hyderabad, Kota, Jodhpur, Varanasi, Vijayawada
Ireland	Cliffs of Moher, Cork, Dublin
Italy	See below
Japan	Ageo, Aizuwakamatsu, Akashi, Akita, Amagasaki, Aomori, Asahikawa, Beppu, Chiba, Echizen, Fuji, Fukaya, Fukui, Fukuoka, Fukuyama, Funabashi, Gifu, Hachinohe, Hachiōji, Hagi, Hakodate, Hamamatsu, Higashihiroshima, Higashiosaka, Hikone, Himeji, Hirakata, Hiratsuka, Hiroshima, Hitachi, Hōfu, Ichihara, Ichikawa, Ichinomiya, Ise, Isesaki, Izumo, Kagoshima, Kakogawa, Kanazawa, Kawagoe, Kawaguchi, Kawasaki, Kishiwada, Kitakyushu, Kitami, Kobe, Kōchi, Kōfu, Koga, Koshigaya, Kuki, Kumagaya, Kumamoto, Kurashiki, Kure, Kurume, Kushiro, Kyoto, Maebashi, Matsumoto, Matsuyama, Mito, Miyazaki, Nagasaki, Nagoya, Naha, Nara, Narita, Naruto, Niigata, Nishinomiya, Obihiro, Odawara, Oita, Okayama, Okazaki, Omuta, Onomichi, Osaka, Ōta, Ōtsu, Oyama, Saitama, Sagamihara, Sakai, Sakura, Sapporo, Sasebo, Sendai, Shimonoseki, Shizuoka, Takahashi, Takamatsu, Takasaki, Takatsuki, Tōjinbō, Tokorozawa,Tokushima, Tokyo, Toyama, Toyohashi, Toyooka, Toyota, Tsu, Tsukuba, Tsunoshima, Ube, Uji, Utsunomiya, Wakayama, Yamagata, Yokkaichi, Yokohama
Luxembourg	Luxembourg
Mexico	Acapulco, Aguascalientes, Chichen Itza, Cuernavaca, Culiacán, Ensenada, Guadalajara, Guaymas, Hermosillo, La Paz, Loreto, Los Cabos, Mazatlán, Mexicali, Oaxaca, Puebla, Puerto Vallarta, Teotihuacan, parts of Tijuana, Tulum
Monaco	Full coverage
Netherlands	Alkmaar, Amsterdam, Arnhem, Breda, Dordrecht, Ede, Eindhoven, Enschede, Groningen, Haarlem, Heerlen, Kerkrade, Nijmegen, Rotterdam, Sittard, Tilburg, The Hague, Utrecht, Veenendaal, Zoetermeer
New Zealand	Auckland, Christchurch, Dunedin, Hamilton, Hastings, Napier, Nelson, New Plymouth, Palmerston North, Queenstown, Rotorua, Tauranga, Wellington
Norway	Bergen, Oslo, Stavanger, Trondheim
Portugal	Braga, Coimbra, Funchal, Lisbon, Porto
San Marino	Full coverage
Slovenia	Small portions near Trieste (Note: Includes the villages of Cerej, Elerji, Hrvatini, Kastelec, Kolomban, Plavje and Premančan.)
South Africa	Bloemfontein, Cape Town, Durban, East London, Gqeberha, Johannesburg, Pietermaritzburg, Pretoria
Spain	See below
Sweden	Gothenburg, Helsingborg, Linköping, Malmö, Stockholm, Uppsala, Visby
Switzerland	Basel, Bern, Biel/Bienne, Fribourg, Geneva, Lausanne, Liestal, Lucerne, Lugano, Montreux, Neuchâtel, Schaffhausen, Solothurn, St. Gallen, Thun, Zug, Zurich
United Kingdom	See below
United States	See below
Vatican City	Full coverage

Locations in Australia with Flyovers
State/territory	Locations
New South Wales	Albury, Armidale, Ballina, Batemans Bay, Bathurst, Bellingen, Bowral, Branxton, Broken Hill, Byron Bay, Central Coast, Coffs Harbour, Cowra, Dubbo, Forbes, Forster, Goulburn, Grafton, Griffith, Gunnedah, Kempsey, Lismore, Lithgow, Muswellbrook, Narrabri, Nelson Bay, Nowra, Orange, Port Macquarie, Singleton, Sydney, Tamworth, Taree, Ulladulla, Wagga Wagga, Wollongong, Yass, Young
Queensland	Atherton, Ayr, Bowen, Brisbane, Bundaberg, Cairns, Dalby, Gatton, Gladstone, Gold Coast, Gympie, Hervey Bay, Innisfail, Mackay, Mareeba, Mount Isa, Port Douglas, Proserpine, Rockhampton, Sunshine Coast, Toowoomba, Townsville, Warwick, Yeppoon
South Australia	Adelaide, Mount Gambier, Murray Bridge, Nuriootpa, Port Augusta, Port Lincoln, Port Pirie, Roxby Downs, Strathalbyn, Victor Harbor, Whyalla
Tasmania	Burnie, Devonport, Hobart, Launceston
Victoria	Bairnsdale, Ballarat, Benalla, Bendigo, Colac, Echuca, Geelong, Horsham, Lakes Entrance, Melbourne, Mildura, Morwell, Portland, Sale, Shepparton, Swan Hill, Traralgon, Twelve Apostles, Wangaratta, Warragul, Warrnambool
Western Australia	Albany, Broome, Bunbury, Busselton, Esperance, Geraldton, Kalgoorie, Karratha, Perth, Port Hedland
Australian Capital Territory	Canberra
Northern Territory	Alice Springs, Darwin, Katherine

Locations in France with Flyovers
Region	Locations
Auvergne-Rhône-Alpes	Annecy, Chambéry, Clermont-Ferrand, Gorges de l'Ardèche, Lyon, Saint-Étienne, Villefranche-sur-Saône
Bourgogne-Franche-Comté	Besançon, Dijon
Brittany	Rennes
Centre-Val de Loire	Chambord, Chenonceaux
Corsica	Ajaccio, Bastia, Bonifacio, Calvi, Corte, Porto-Vecchio, Propriano
Grand Est	Mulhouse, Nancy, Reims, Saint-Louis, Strasbourg, Thionville, Troyes
Hauts-de-France	Amiens, Armentières, Boulogne-sur-mer, Douai, Dunkirk, Lens, Lille, Roubaix, Tourcoing
Île-de-France	Paris, Versailles
Normandy	Caen, Le Havre, Mont Saint-Michel, Omaha Beach, Rouen
Nouvelle-Aquitaine	Arcachon, Biarritz, Bordeaux, La Rochelle, Limoges
Occitanie	Béziers, Carcassonne, Collioure, Millau, Montpellier, Nîmes, Perpignan, Pont du Gard, Remoulins, Toulouse
Pays de la Loire	Angers, Le Mans, Nantes
Provence-Alpes-Côte d'Azur	Aix-en-Provence, Antibes, Aubagne, Avignon, Cannes, Châteauneuf-du-Pape, Fréjus, Gorges Du Verdon, Grasse, Marseille, Menton, Nice, Saint-Tropez

Locations in Germany with Flyovers
State	Locations
Baden-Württemberg	Böblingen, Esslingen, Göppingen, Heidelberg, Heilbronn, Karlsruhe, Kehl, Konstanz, Lörrach, Ludwigsburg, Mannheim, Pforzheim, Ravensburg, Reutlingen, Rheinfelden, Sindelfingen, Stuttgart, Tübingen, Ulm, Weinheim
Bavaria	Aschaffenburg, Augsburg, Bamberg, Dachau, Erlangen, Fürth, Füssen, Ingolstadt, Landshut, Munich, Neuschwanstein Castle, Nuremberg, Regensburg, Rosenheim, Schwabach, Schweinfurt, Würzburg
Berlin	Berlin
Brandenburg	Cottbus, Potsdam
Bremen	Bremen, Bremerhaven
Hamburg	Hamburg
Hesse	Darmstadt, Frankfurt, Giessen, Hanau, Kassel, Marburg, OffenbachRüsselsheim, Wiesbaden
Lower Saxony	Braunschweig, Buxtehude, Delmenhorst, Göttingen, Hanover, Hildesheim, Lüneburg, Oldenburg, Osnabrück, Wolfsburg
Mecklenburg-Vorpommern	Rostock, Schwerin
North Rhine-Westphalia	Aachen, Bergisch Gladbach, Bielefeld, Bochum, Bonn, Bottrop, Brühl, Cologne, Dinslaken, Dormagen, Dorsten, Dortmund, Duisburg, Düsseldorf, Essen, Gelsenkirchen, Haan, Hagen, Hennef, Herne, Hürth, Königswinter, Krefeld, Leverkusen, Lünen, Marl, Moers, Mönchengladbach, Mülheim, Münster, Neuss, Oberhausen, Paderborn, Ratingen, Recklinghausen, Solingen, Velbert, Witten, Wuppertal
Rhineland-Palatinate	Kaiserslautern, Koblenz, Ludwigshafen, Mainz, Neuwied, Trier
Saarland	Saarbrücken
Saxony	Chemnitz, Dresden, Leipzig
Saxony-Anhalt	Halle (Saale), Magdeburg
Schleswig-Holstein	Ahrensburg, Flensburg, Kiel, Lübeck, Norderstedt, Pinneberg
Thuringia	Erfurt, Jena

Locations in Italy with Flyovers
Region	Locations
Abruzzo	Pescara, Vasto
Apulia	Andria, Bari, Bisceglie, Bitonto, Foggia, Lecce, Molfetta, Taranto, Trani
Calabria	Catanzaro, Cosenza, Lamezia Terme, Reggio Calabria
Campania	Acerra, Amalfi, Aversa, Capri, Caserta, Castellammare, Ercolano, Naples, Nola, Paestum, Pompei, Salerno, Sorrento
Emilia-Romagna	Bobbio, Bologna, Ferrara, Modena, Parma, Piacenza, Reggio Emilia, Riccione, Rimini
Friuli-Venezia Giulia	Trieste, Udine
Lazio	Fiumicino, Rome, Tivoli
Liguria	Genoa, Sanremo
Lombardy	Bergamo, Brescia, Busto Arsizio, Como, Erba, Gallarate, Lecco, Magenta, Milan, Monza, Pavia, Rho, Seregno, Sesto San Giovanni, Varese
Marche	Ancona
Piedmont	Chieri, Moncalieri, Novara, Rivoli, Turin
Sardinia	Cagliari, Olbia, Sassari
Sicily	Acireale, Bagheria, Catania, Messina, Palermo, Paternò, Syracuse, Taormina
Trentino-South Tyrol	Bolzano
Tuscany	Empoli, Florence, Livorno, Montecatini Terme, Pisa, Pistoia, Prato
Umbria	Foligno, Perugia, Terni
Veneto	Cittadella, Padua, Treviso, Venice, Verona, Vicenza

Locations in Spain with Flyovers
Community	Locations
Andalusia	Algeciras, Almería, Cádiz, Córdoba, Estepona, Fuengirola, Granada, Huelva, Jaén, Jerez de la Frontera, La Línea, Málaga, Marbella, Seville,
Aragon	Zaragoza
Asturias	Gijón, Oviedo
Basque Country	Bilbao, San Sebastián, Vitoria-Gasteiz
Cantabria	Santander
Castile and León	Burgos, León, Salamanca, Valladolid
Castilla–La Mancha	Albacete, Ciudad Real, Villanueva de los Infantes
Catalonia	Barcelona, Girona, Igualada, Lleida
Extremadura	Badajoz, Cáceres
Galicia	A Coruña, Lugo, Vigo
La Rioja	Logroño
Madrid	Madrid
Murcia	Cartagena, Murcia
Navarre	Pamplona
Valencian Community	Alicante, Benidorm, Castellón de la Plana, Elche, Torrevieja, Valencia

Locations in the United Kingdom with Flyovers
Country/territory	Locations
England	Ashford, Aylesbury, Barnsley, Barrow-in-Furness, Basingstoke, Bath, Bedford, Birmingham, Blackpool, Bournemouth, Boston, Bradford, Brighton, Bristol, Burgess Hill, Burton upon Trent, Bury St. Edmunds, Cambridge, Canterbury, Carlisle, Chelmsford, Clacton-on-Sea, Colchester, Crewe, Coventry, Doncaster, Eastbourne, Exeter, Folkestone, Gloucester, Great Yarmouth, Grimsby, Harrogate, Hastings, Hereford, High Wycombe, Horsham, Ipswich, Kettering, Kingston upon Hull, Lancaster, Leeds, Leicester, Lincoln, Liverpool, London, Loughborough, Luton, Manchester, Mansfield, Margate, Middlesbrough, Milton Keynes, Newbury, Newcastle, Northampton, Norwich, Nottingham, Oxford, Peterborough, Plymouth, Portsmouth, Preston, Reading, Royal Tunbridge Wells, Scarborough, Scunthorpe, Sheffield, Shrewsbury,Sittingbourne, Southampton, Stafford, Stevenage, Stoke-on-Trent, Stonehenge, Swindon, Taunton, Telford, Torquay, Wakefield, Weston-super-Mare, Wolverhampton, Worcester, Worthing, Wrexham, Yeovil, York
Scotland	Aberdeen, Ayr, Dundee, Edinburgh, Falkirk, Glasgow, Greenock, Inverness, Kirkcaldy, Perth, Stirling
Wales	Bridgend, Cardiff, Llanelli, Newport, Swansea, Wrexham
Northern Ireland	Belfast, Derry
British Virgin Islands	Full coverage
Gibraltar	Full coverage

Locations in the United States with Flyovers
State/territory	Locations
Alabama	Birmingham, Huntsville, Mobile, Montgomery, Phenix City
Arizona	Grand Canyon, Hoover Dam, Lake Powell, Meteor Crater, Monument Valley, Phoenix, Prescott, Tucson, Yuma
Arkansas	Conway, Fayetteville, Little Rock, West Memphis
California	Anaheim, Bakersfield, Catalina Island, Chico, El Centro, Fresno, Hanford, Joshua Tree National Park, Lake Tahoe, Lancaster, Lassen Volcanic National Park, Long Beach, Los Angeles, Mammoth Lakes, Merced, Modesto, Oakland, Palm Springs, Paso Robles, Pinnacles National Park, Porterville, Redding, Reedley, Riverside, Sacramento, San Bernardino, San Diego, San Francisco, San Jose, San Luis Obispo, Santa Barbara, Santa Maria, Santa Rosa, Stockton, Temecula, Tulare, Victorville, Visalia, Yosemite National Park, Yuba City
Colorado	Boulder, Colorado Springs, Denver, Estes Park, Fort Collins, Greeley, Pueblo, Royal Gorge
Connecticut	Bridgeport, Hartford, New Haven, New London, Norwich, Stamford, Waterbury
Delaware	Dover, Wilmington
District of Columbia	Full coverage
Florida	Bradenton, Daytona Beach, Florida Keys, Fort Lauderdale, Fort Myers, Gainesville, Jacksonville, Lakeland, Miami, Ocala, Orlando, Palm Coast, Panama City, Pensacola, Port St. Lucie, Sarasota, Sebring, Spring Hill, St. Petersburg, Tallahassee, Tampa, The Villages, West Palm Beach, Winter Haven
Georgia	Athens, Atlanta, Augusta, Columbus, Dalton, Gainesville, Newnan, Rome, Savannah
Hawaii	Hilo, Honolulu, Kahului, Kailua, Kailua-Kona, Kapaʻa, Lahaina, Wailea
Idaho	Boise, Coeur d'Alene, Idaho Falls
Illinois	Carbondale, Chicago, DeKalb, East St. Louis, Kankakee, Peoria, Springfield
Indiana	Fort Wayne, Gary, Indianapolis, Lafayette, Michigan City, South Bend
Iowa	Cedar Rapids, Council Bluffs, Des Moines, Iowa City
Kansas	Kansas City, Lawrence, Topeka, Wichita
Kentucky	Covington, Lexington, Louisville
Louisiana	Baton Rouge, Hammond, Houma, Lafayette, New Iberia, New Orleans, Shreveport
Maine	Bangor, Portland
Maryland	Annapolis, Baltimore, Frederick, Waldorf
Massachusetts	Amherst, Boston, Cape Cod, Fall River, Martha's Vineyard, Nantucket, New Bedford, Springfield, Worcester
Michigan	Ann Arbor, Battle Creek, Detroit, Flint, Grand Rapids, Holland, Jackson, Kalamazoo, Lansing, Monroe, Muskegon
Minnesota	Minneapolis, Moorhead, St. Paul
Mississippi	Jackson
Missouri	Columbia, Kansas City, Springfield, St. Louis
Montana	Billings
Nebraska	Lincoln, Omaha
Nevada	Boulder City, Carson City, Hoover Dam, Las Vegas, Reno
New Hampshire	Concord, Derry, Manchester, Milford, Nashua
New Jersey	Asbury Park, Camden, Jersey City, Newark, New Brunswick, Princeton, Trenton
New Mexico	Albuquerque, Farmington, Las Cruces, Los Lunas, Roswell, Santa Fe
New York	Albany, Buffalo, Kiryas Joel, Long Island, New York City, Newburgh, Niagara Falls, Poughkeepsie, Rochester, Schenectady, Syracuse
North Carolina	Asheboro, Asheville, Burlington, Chapel Hill, Charlotte, Concord, Fayetteville, Gastonia, Greensboro, High Point, Raleigh, Salisbury, Statesville, Winston-Salem
North Dakota	Fargo
Ohio	Akron, Canton, Cincinnati, Cleveland, Columbus, Dayton, Springfield, Toledo, Youngstown
Oklahoma	Oklahoma City, Norman, Tulsa
Oregon	Eugene, Grants Pass, Medford, Portland, Salem
Pennsylvania	Allentown, Bloomsburg, Harrisburg, Lancaster, Philadelphia, Pittsburgh
Puerto Rico	Aguadilla, Arecibo, Caguas, Mayagüez, Ponce, San Juan
Rhode Island	Newport, Providence, Woonsocket
South Carolina	Anderson, Beaufort, Charleston, Columbia, Greenville, Hilton Head Island, North Augusta, Rock Hill, Spartanburg
South Dakota	Mount Rushmore, Rapid City, Sioux Falls
Tennessee	Chattanooga, Clarksville, Cookeville, Johnson City, Kingsport, Knoxville, Memphis, Morristown, Nashville
Texas	Abilene, Amarillo, Arlington, Austin, Beaumont, Brownsville, College Station, Corpus Christi, Dallas, Denton, El Paso, Fort Worth, Killeen, Houston, Longview, Lubbock, McAllen, Midland, Odessa, Orange, Plano, Port Arthur, San Angelo, San Antonio, Sherman, Waco
U.S. Virgin Islands	Full coverage
Utah	Arches National Park, Canyonlands National Park, Lake Powell, Logan, Monument Valley, Ogden, Provo, Salt Lake City, St. George, Zion National Park
Vermont	Burlington
Virginia	Arlington, Blacksburg, Lynchburg, Newport News, Norfolk, Petersburg, Richmond, Roanoke, Virginia Beach
Washington	Bellingham, Kennewick, Mount Vernon, Olympia, Seattle, Spokane, Tacoma, Vancouver, Yakima
West Virginia	Charleston, Huntington
Wisconsin	Green Bay, La Crosse, Madison, Milwaukee
Wyoming	Cheyenne, Devils Tower

== Reception ==
Upon initial release in 2012, Flyover received mixed reception among news outlets. Flyover was described positively by several news organizations, including NBC, Yahoo News and the New York Times. The BBC News in the United Kingdom described Flyover as giving Apple an "edge" over Google Maps, where no 3D imagery was directly available, while USA Today referred to Flyover as a "gee-whiz" feature. Flyover has also been mentioned as a competitor to Google Maps' Street View feature.

=== Visual errors ===
Similar to Maps itself, Flyover saw many visual issues upon release, a notable one containing a massive glitch on the Brooklyn and Anzac bridges in New York and Sydney and the Hoover Dam in Nevada, showing "plunges" on all structures. Flyover was also criticized for its early imagery, as Apple was initially unable to properly capture smaller or lower objects or buildings, resulting in structures such as trees having a blocky or otherwise low-quality appearance. Flyover additionally had glitches whilst interacting with other Maps features, including road markings, which would tend to follow the tops of 3D buildings rather than remain focused on the designated road, which particularly became an issue for bridges. Google Earth, which also hosted 3D imagery on their mapping site, was noted to be experiencing similar issues with their image rendering.

As a result of these issues, Flyover was initially criticized for its low quality, as well as being parodied online. The feature was also mentioned by Apple CEO Tim Cook in his apology statement regarding Apple Maps. Flyover was described by The Atlantic, an American magazine, as "painfully slow, sort of useless", in a 2012 publication. Despite this, some publications such as CNET claimed that areas supported with Flyover saw fewer bugs than in areas without Flyover. This was part of a larger series of technical issues with Apple Maps, most of which have since been fixed. Shortly after its initial release, Apple began to improve upon their initial criticized imagery.

=== Security concerns ===
In 2013, the Norwegian government denied a request by Apple to add Flyover to Oslo, the Norwegian capital, citing security concerns arising from the amount of detail given to buildings, information which could potentially be used to facilitate and carry out terrorist attacks. Øyvind Mandt, who worked for the National Security Authority, stated that "We do not want it [Flyover] to be shot with such a high degree of precision that it could be used to identify areas that require special shielding." Concern was specifically elicited regarding the capturing of government and military buildings, where outside photography is normally not permitted, alongside increased security inside and around government buildings, primarily in response to the 2011 Norway attacks. Another spokesperson for the National Security Authority claimed that the level of detail used by Apple to collect data exceeded the amount allowed in particular areas of Oslo.

The decision was met with criticism from Fabian Stang, then mayor of Oslo, who called for the Norwegian government to allow Apple to add the feature, citing the possibility of increased tourism from the addition, also stating that Apple had already been permitted to conduct aerial surveys in "all Western capitals." A spokesperson for the National Security Authority of Norway stated that obtaining the needed imagery from a "Norwegian supplier" or from the Norwegian Mapping Authority could potentially assist Apple in adding the feature, as said companies are required to produce their imagery in a lower resolution. The US embassy in Norway also stated its support for Apple in adding the feature. Outside of Apple, other companies including Nokia were permitted to survey Oslo for 3D imagery.

Flyover was eventually added to Oslo in late 2023, 11 years after the initial incident. Similar security concerns may have also prevented Apple from adding Flyover to other potentially sensitive areas, including Washington D.C., among others.

== See also ==
- 3D modeling
- Detailed City Experience
- Pre-installed iOS apps
