= Botevo, Yambol Province =

Botevo Ботево
- Location of Botevo
- Coordinates: 42°31′30″N 26°21′38″E
- Country: Bulgaria
- Provinces (Oblast): Yambol

Government
  - Mayor: Georgi Tanew
- Elevation: 119 m (390 ft)

Population (2011)
  - Total: 899
- Time zone: UTC+2 (EET)
  - Summer (DST): UTC+3 (EEST)
- Postal Code: 8638
- Area code: 04792

Botevo (Bulgarian: Ботево) is a village in South-Eastern Bulgaria in the Yambol Province, in the Tundzha Municipality. According to the National Institute of Statistics, in the year of 2011, the village had 899 inhabitants.
