= Look Around (Apple) =

Technical feature of Apple Maps

- Release: September 19, 2019; 7 years ago
- Platform: iOS, iPadOS, macOS
- Available in: Multiple languages

Look Around is a technology featured in Apple Maps that provides interactive panoramas from positions along a number of streets in various countries. Look Around allows the user to view 360° street-level imagery, with smooth transitions as the scene is navigated. Look Around was introduced with iOS 13 at Apple Worldwide Developers Conference in June 2019. It was publicly released as part of iOS 13 on September 19, 2019.

== Background ==
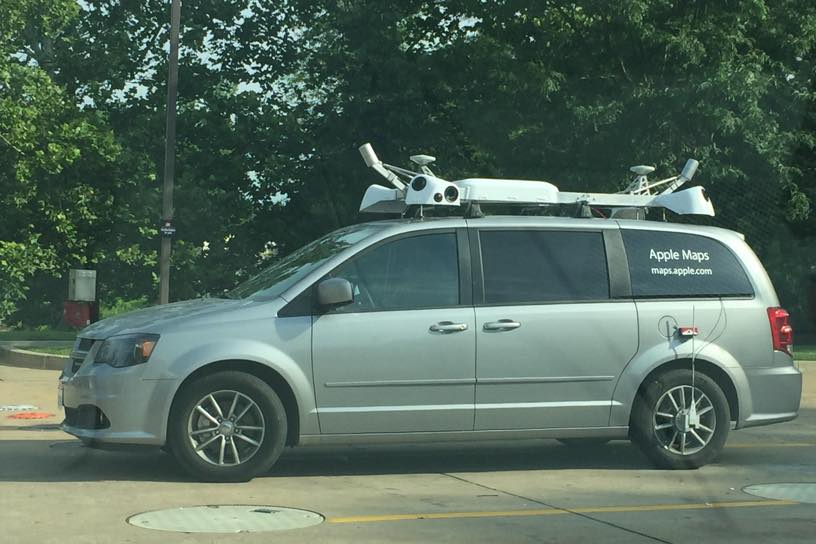
An Apple Maps vehicle driving through St. Charles, Missouri, in June 2015

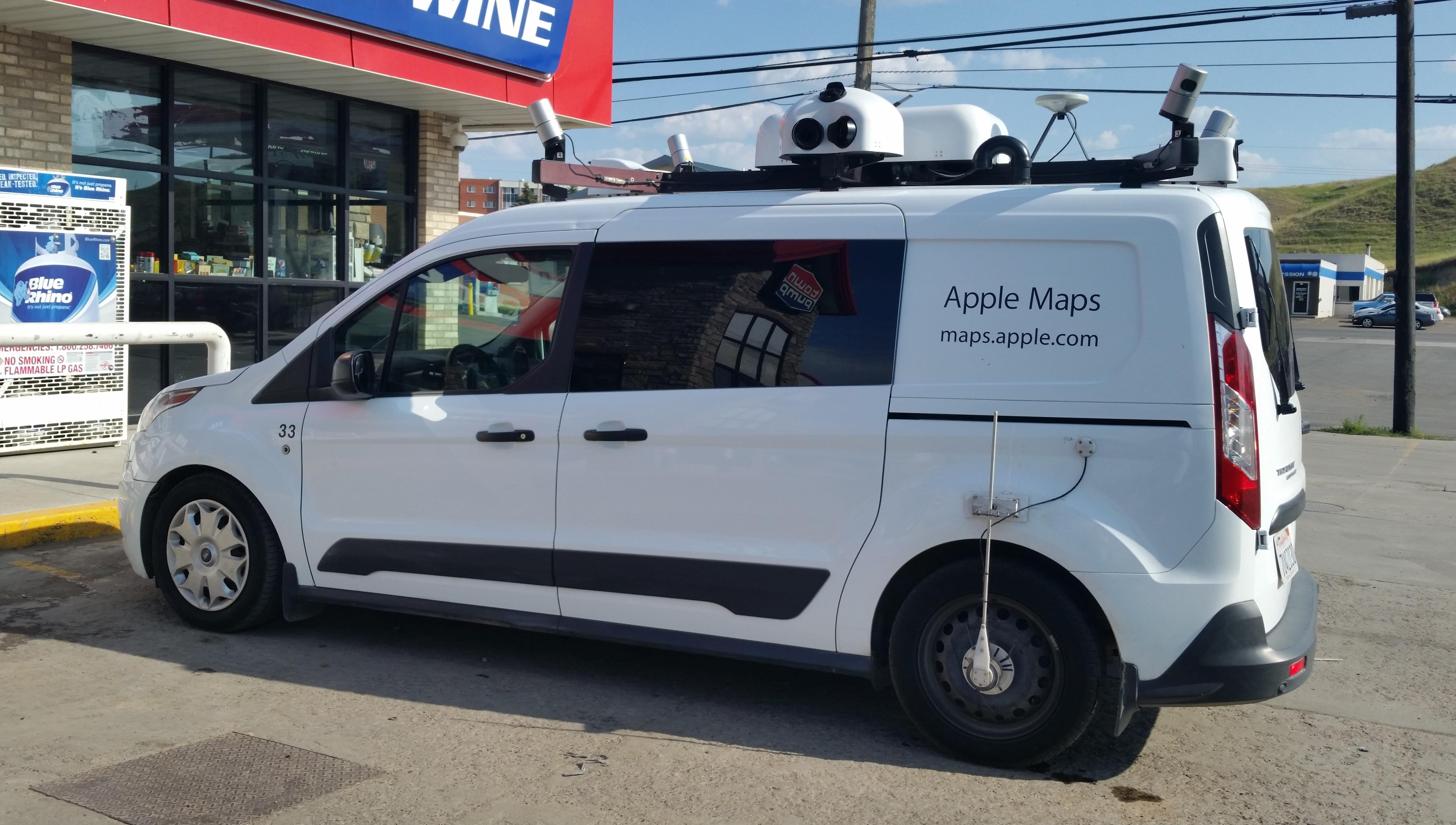
INAn Apple Maps van in Havre, Montana, in July 2018

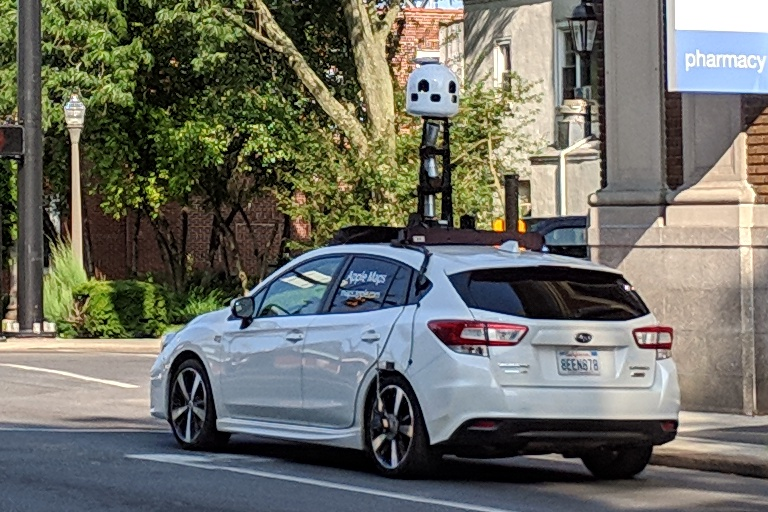
An Apple Maps car near Philadelphia, Pennsylvania, in June 2019

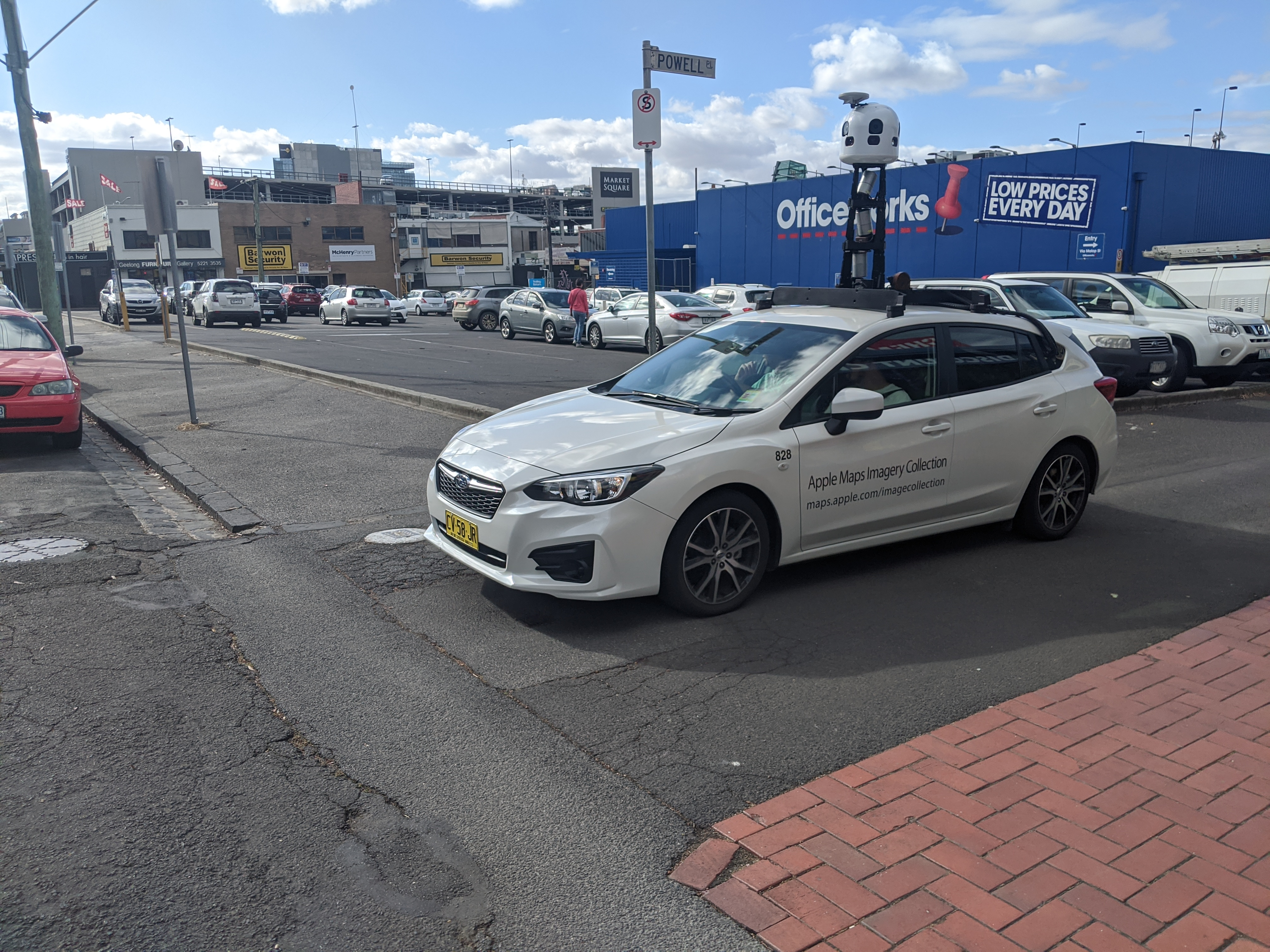
An Apple Maps car driving in Geelong, Australia, in November 2019

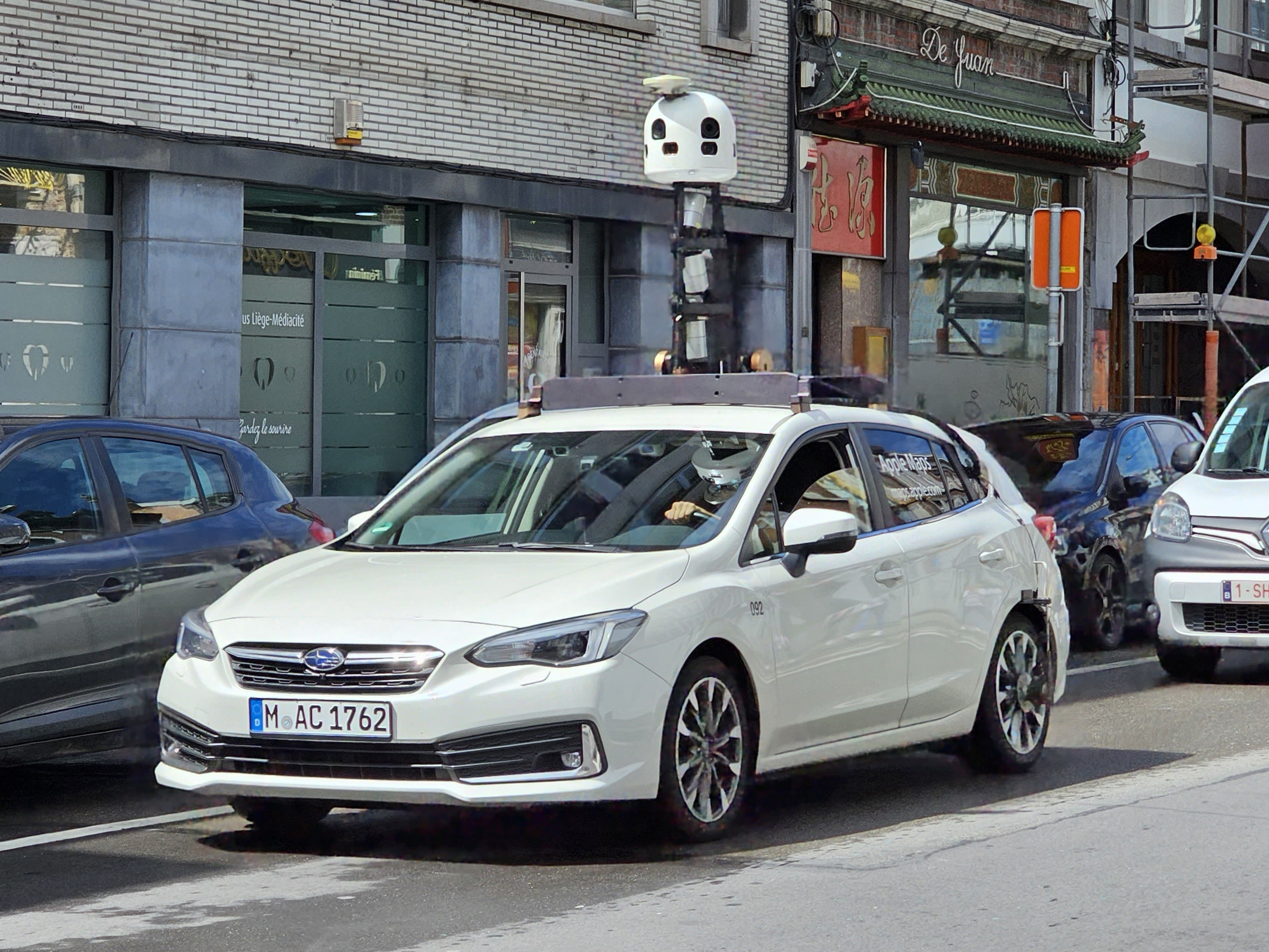
An Apple Maps car driving in Liège, Belgium, in August 2023

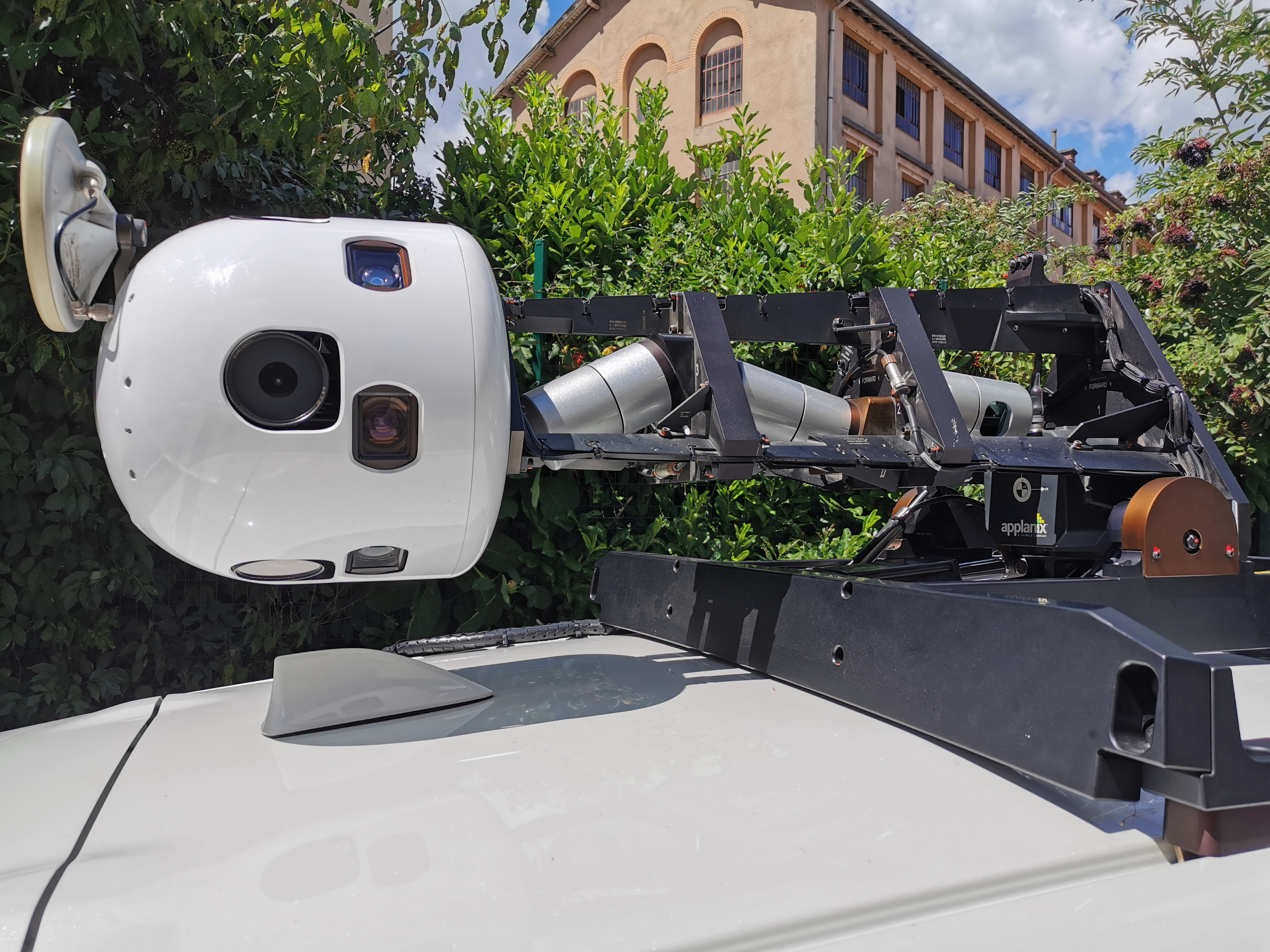
Cameras of an Apple Maps car in Grenoble, France, in June 2020

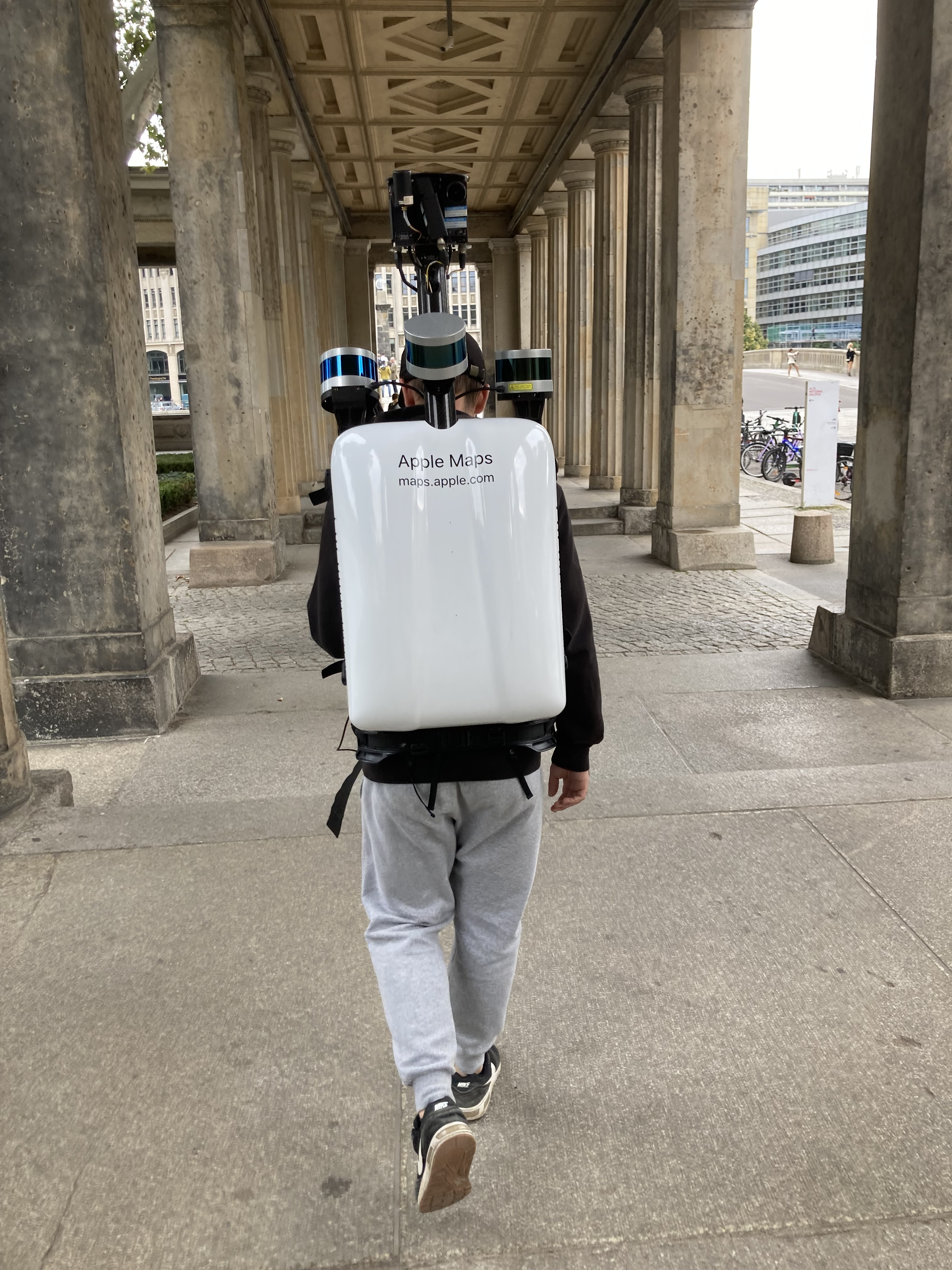
An Apple Maps sidewalk backpack in Berlin, Germany, in September 2021

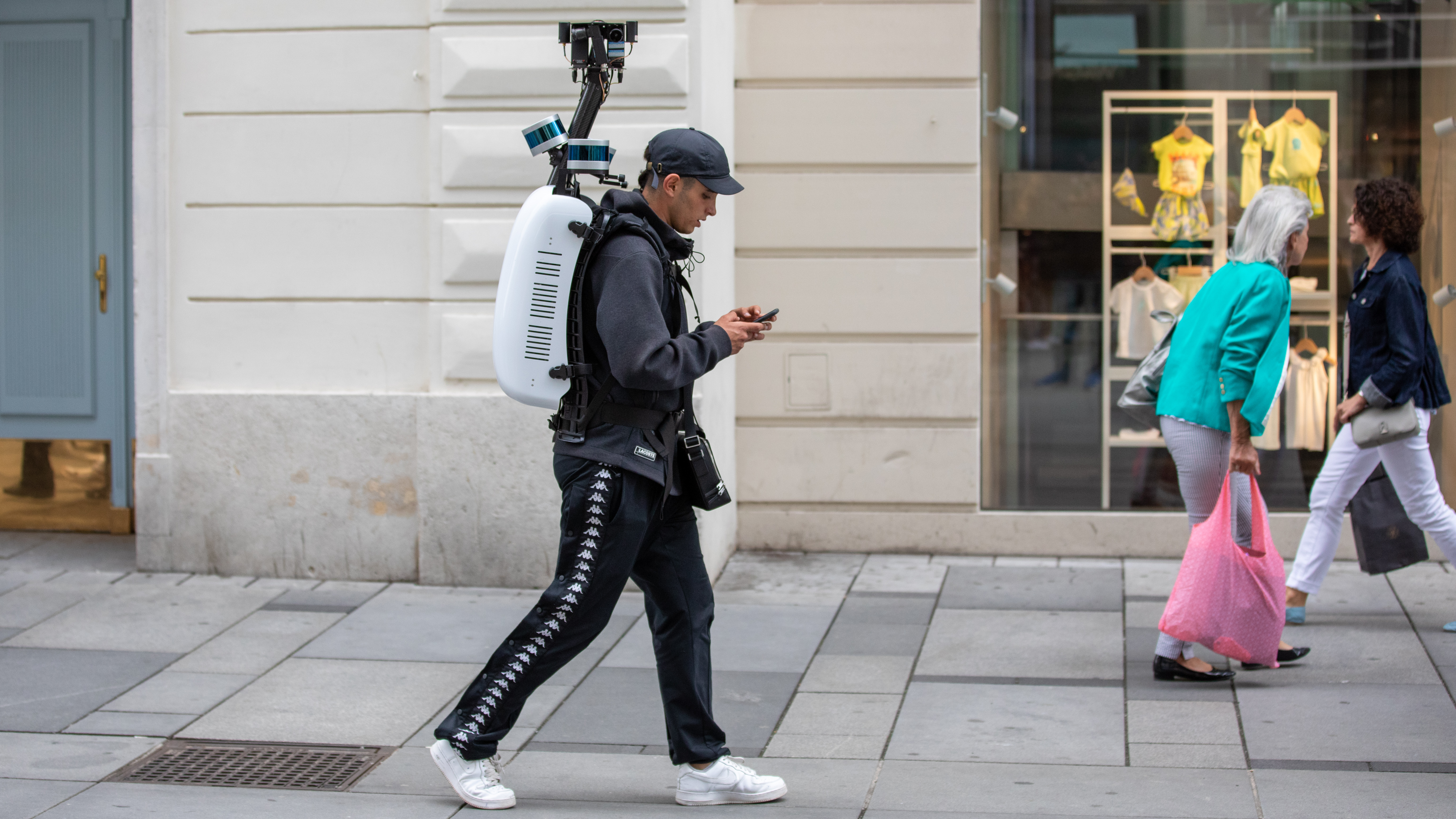
An Apple Maps sidewalk backpack in Vienna, Austria, in June 2022

In early 2015, vehicles equipped with twelve cameras and lidar sensors were seen in a variety of locations in the United States. These vehicles were owned by Apple and were also seen in places like the United Kingdom, Ireland, France, and Sweden. In June 2015, Apple stated on its website that the vehicles were collecting data to improve Apple Maps. Also, Apple claimed to secure privacy by making faces and license plates unrecognizable. In 2018 Apple confirmed in an article that it was rebuilding Apple Maps, with the first results rolled out in California.

In 2017, Apple started surveying Spain, Portugal, Croatia, and Slovenia. A year later, in 2018, Apple started collecting imagery in Japan.

In 2019, Apple started releasing the new map in United States. In January, California received the new map. In April, Arizona and New Mexico got the new map. In May 2019, Apple announced plans to begin collecting data for Apple Maps in Canada. In November, the new map covered 51% of the United States. In December, the entire United States is covered by the new map.

In 2019, Apple started collecting imagery in Andorra, Canada, San Marino, Germany and Australia.

During WWDC on June 22, 2020, Apple announced its new maps would be coming to Ireland, the United Kingdom, and Canada later in the year. Apple began testing the new map in the United Kingdom and Ireland on August 23, 2020, and published it on October 1, 2020. Apple launched testing of its new map in Canada on October 20, 2020, before deploying it on December 10, 2020.

In 2020, Apple started collecting imagery in Monaco, Belgium, the Netherlands, Finland, Norway, Israel, New Zealand and Singapore.

During WWDC 2021 on June 7, 2021, Apple announced that Spain and Portugal would receive the new maps that day, with both Australia and Italy getting them later in the year. Apple started testing its new map data in Spain and Portugal on April 22, 2021, with the maps launching in June 2021. On September 10, 2021, Apple published new map data in Andorra, Italy, San Marino, and Vatican City. Apple began testing its new maps in Australia on October 19, 2021, publishing the new data on December 9, 2021.

In 2021, Apple started collecting imagery in Hungary, Hong Kong, Luxembourg, Liechtenstein, Poland, the Czech Republic, Austria, Switzerland, and Taiwan.

On March 7, 2022, Apple started collecting imagery in Greece. On March 4, 2022, Apple began testing its new map in Germany and Singapore. On April 21, 2022, Munich and most of Singapore received Look Around alongside the new maps. On May 14, 2022, Apple started collecting imagery in Denmark. On May 29, 2022, Apple began testing its new map in France, Monaco, and New Zealand, with the maps launching on July 7, 2022. On June 3, 2022, Apple announced a first round of imagery collection in Mexico, which began in August 2022. During Apple's WWDC event in June 2022, it was announced that eleven new countries would receive the new maps by the end of the year, including Belgium, Israel, Liechtenstein, Luxembourg, Netherlands, Palestinian Territories, Saudi Arabia, and Switzerland. The Look Around feature was enabled in all of Germany on July 25, 2022.

Apple started testing its new map data in Israel, the Palestinian Territories, and Saudi Arabia on August 5, 2022. In September 2022, Apple announced the start of image collection in Thailand, which began in October 2022. On November 3, 2022, Apple started testing its new map data in Belgium, Liechtenstein, Luxembourg, the Netherlands, and Switzerland. The new data was released on December 15, 2022, alongside Israel, Palestinian Territories, and Saudi Arabia.

In 2022, Apple began collecting imagery in Greece, Denmark, Mexico, and Thailand.

On January 23, 2023, Apple began testing its new map data in Austria, Finland, Norway, and Sweden. On March 2, 2023, the new maps were launched in Finland, Norway, and Sweden. On March 10, 2023, Apple began testing its new map data in Austria, Croatia, the Czech Republic, Hungary, Poland, and Slovenia. The new maps were released on April 6, 2023. On April 17, 2023, Apple began surveying the United Arab Emirates. On May 2, 2023, Apple began testing its new map in Hong Kong, Slovakia, and Taiwan. The new map data was published for these countries in June 2023. On July 31, 2023, Apple began testing its new maps in Denmark and Greece, with the map data officially launching on October 12, 2023.

Overall in 2023, Apple began collecting imagery in Brazil, India, Malaysia, and the United Arab Emirates.

In January 2024, an Apple Maps car was spotted in USJ 20, Malaysia, with the text Koleksi Imejan Apple Maps (English: Apple Maps Image Collection) emblazoned on the car. In December of the same year, Look Around was released on the web version of Apple Maps.

Overall in 2024, Apple began collecting imagery in Cyprus, Bulgaria, Estonia, Iceland, Latvia, Lithuania, Malta, Romania, Serbia, Slovakia, and Vietnam.

On January 25, 2025, Apple began testing its new map data in Thailand, with the official launch occurring on May 8, 2025. Apple released Look Around in most of Mexico on August 21, 2025.

In 2025, Apple began collecting imagery in Albania, Bosnia and Herzegovina, Kosovo, Montenegro, and North Macedonia.

On September 16, 2026, Apple began testing its new map data in India.

On October 9, 2026, Apple released nationwide Look Around coverage in Thailand. On November 18, 2026, Apple released its new map data and Look Around in India.

As of November 2026, Look Around covers around 87 areas, including parts of the United Kingdom (which includes the overseas territory of Gibraltar), Ireland, Canada, Japan, Andorra, Spain (including the Balearic and Canary Islands), Portugal, Italy (including Sardinia and Sicily), San Marino, Australia, Germany, Singapore, France, New Zealand, the United States, Israel, Belgium, Liechtenstein, Luxembourg, the Netherlands, Switzerland, Norway, Sweden, Finland, Croatia, the Czech Republic, Hungary, Poland, Slovenia, Taiwan, Austria, Greece, Denmark, Hong Kong, Monaco, Mexico, Estonia, Latvia, Lithuania, Thailand, and India.

=== Refine Location ===
In iOS 14, Apple released a new feature called Refine Location in Apple Maps: if the app cannot otherwise get precise location information, it prompts the user to scan the surrounding area. This uses Look Around data to improve the accuracy of the current location. As of November 2026, the following areas have received the Refine Location feature:

Locations with Refine Location
Country	Location
Australia	Adelaide, Brisbane, Canberra, Melbourne, Perth, Sydney
Austria	Graz, Innsbruck, Salzburg, Vienna
Belgium	Antwerp, Brussels
Canada	Calgary, Edmonton, Montreal, Ottawa, Toronto, Quebec City, Vancouver, Vancouver Island, Winnipeg
Croatia	Split, Zagreb
Czech Republic	Prague
Denmark	Copenhagen
Finland	Helsinki
France	Bordeaux, Lille, Lyon, Marseille, Nantes, Paris, Reims, Rouen, Toulouse
Germany	Berlin, Bonn, Bremen, Cologne, Dortmund, Düsseldorf, Essen, Frankfurt, Hamburg, Leipzig, Munich, Stuttgart
Greece	Athens
Hungary	Budapest
India	Bengaluru, Delhi, Hyderabad, Mumbai
Ireland	Dublin
Israel	Jerusalem, Tel Aviv
Italy	Bologna, Catania, Florence, Genoa, Milan, Naples, Palermo, Rome, Venice
Japan	Fukuoka, Kyoto, Nagoya, Osaka, Sapporo, Tokyo
Luxembourg	Luxembourg
Mexico	Guadalajara, Mexico City, Monterrey, Tijuana
Netherlands	Amsterdam, Rotterdam, The Hague
New Zealand	Auckland, Christchurch, Wellington
Norway	Oslo
Poland	Kraków, Warsaw, Wrocław
Portugal	Lisbon, Porto
Singapore	Singapore
Slovenia	Ljubljana
Spain	Alicante, Barcelona, Bilbao, Cordoba, Granada, Madrid, Málaga, Murcia, Pamplona, Seville, Valladolid, Zaragoza
Sweden	Malmö, Stockholm
Switzerland	Bern, Geneva, Zürich
Taiwan	Taichung, Taipei
Thailand	Bangkok, Chiang Mai, Chiang Rai, Pattaya, Phuket, Udon Thani
United Kingdom	Birmingham, Edinburgh, Glasgow, Leeds, London, Manchester
United States	Atlanta, Austin, Baltimore, Boston, Buffalo, Charlotte, Chicago, Cincinnati, Cleveland, Columbus, Dallas, Denver, Detroit, Fort Lauderdale, Houston, Indianapolis, Jacksonville, Kansas City, Las Vegas, Los Angeles, Louisville, Maui, Memphis, Miami, Milwaukee, Minneapolis, Nashville, New Orleans, New York, Oahu, Oklahoma City, Orange County, Orlando, Philadelphia, Phoenix, Pittsburgh, Portland, Raleigh, Riverside, Sacramento, Salt Lake City, San Antonio, San Bernardino, San Diego, San Francisco Bay Area, Seattle, St. Louis, Tampa, Washington, D.C.

=== AR Walking Directions ===
In iOS 15, Apple released a feature called AR Walking Directions in Apple Maps, where the user scans the surrounding area and will show directions. Much like Refine Location, this feature makes use of the surrounding area and improves the accuracy of directions. As of July 2023, the following areas have received AR Walking Directions:

Locations with AR Walking Directions
Country	Location
Andorra	Andorra
Australia	Adelaide, Brisbane, Canberra, Melbourne, Perth, Sydney
Austria	Vienna
Belgium	Brussels
Canada	Calgary, Edmonton, Montreal, Ottawa, Quebec City, Toronto, Vancouver, Winnipeg
Czech Republic	Prague
Finland	Helsinki
France	Lille, Lyon, Marseille, Nice, Paris
Germany	Berlin, Cologne, Dortmund, Düsseldorf, Essen, Frankfurt, Hamburg, Leipzig, Munich, Stuttgart
Hong Kong	Hong Kong
Ireland	Dublin
Israel	Tel Aviv
Italy	Florence, Milan, Naples, Rome, Turin, Venice
Japan	Aomori, Chiba Prefecture, Fukuoka, Hiroshima, Hyogo, Kagoshima, Kanagawa Prefecture, Kanazawa, Kawasaki, Kitakyushu, Kobe, Kumamoto, Kyoto Prefecture, Maebashi, Nagoya, Niigata, Okayama, Osaka Prefecture, Sapporo, Sendai, Shizuoka, Takamatsu, Takasaki, Tokyo, Yokohama
Liechtenstein	Liechtenstein
Luxembourg	Luxembourg
Monaco	Monaco
Netherlands	Amsterdam, Rotterdam
New Zealand	Auckland, Wellington
Poland	Warsaw
Portugal	Lisbon
San Marino	City of San Marino
Singapore	Singapore
Slovenia	Ljubljana
Spain	Barcelona, Bilbao, Granada, Madrid, Málaga, Murcia, Seville, Valencia
Sweden	Gothenburg, Stockholm
Switzerland	Basel, Geneva, Zurich
Taiwan	Taipei
United Kingdom	Belfast, Birmingham, Bournemouth, Bradford, Brighton, Bristol, Cardiff, Coventry, Edinburgh, Gibraltar, Glasgow, Kingston Upon Hull, Leeds, Liverpool, London, Manchester, Milton Keynes, Oxford, Reading, Sheffield, Southend-on-Sea, Wakefield, Wigan, Wirral
United States	Akron, Albany, Albuquerque, Amarillo, Anaheim, Anchorage, Atlanta, Austin, Bakersfield, Baltimore, Baton Rouge, Billings, Birmingham, Boise, Boston, Buffalo, Cedar Rapids, Charleston, Charlotte, Chicago, Cincinnati, Cleveland, Colorado Springs, Columbia, Columbus, Corpus Christi, Dallas, Dayton, Denver, Detroit, Duluth, El Paso, Eugene, Fargo, Fort Lauderdale, Fort Myers, Fort Wayne, Fresno, Greensboro, Greenville, Green Bay, Harrisburg, Hartford, Houston, Indianapolis, Jackson, Jacksonville, Kansas City, Knoxville, Lansing, Las Vegas, Lincoln, Little Rock, Los Angeles, Louisville, Lubbock, Madison, Memphis, Miami, Milwaukee, Minneapolis, Mobile, Montgomery, Nashville, Newark, New Haven, New Orleans, New York, Norfolk, Oahu, Oklahoma City, Omaha, Orlando, Philadelphia, Phoenix, Pittsburgh, Portland, Portland, Providence, Raleigh, Rapid City, Reno, Richmond, Rockford, Sacramento, Salt Lake City, San Antonio, San Diego, San Francisco Bay Area, San Juan, Savannah, Scranton, Seattle, Sioux Falls, Spokane, Springfield, St. Louis, St. Paul, Syracuse, Tallahassee, Tampa, Toledo, Topeka, Tucson, Tulsa, Virginia Beach, Washington, D.C., Wichita, Winston-Salem

== Timeline of introductions ==
#	Release date	Major locations added
1	September 19, 2019	(United States) Las Vegas, Oahu, San Francisco Bay Area
2	September 30, 2019	(United States) Los Angeles, New York City
3	November 18, 2019	(United States) Houston
4	February 19, 2020	(United States) Boston, Philadelphia, Washington, D.C.
5	April 20, 2020	(United States) Chicago
6	June 29, 2020	(United States) Seattle
7	August 4, 2020	(Japan) Kyoto, Nagoya, Osaka, Tokyo
8	October 1, 2020	(United Kingdom) Edinburgh, London (Republic of Ireland) Dublin
9	October 7, 2020	(United States) Phoenix
10	December 4, 2020	(Japan) Fukuoka, Hiroshima, Takamatsu
11	December 10, 2020	Southern Canada
12	December 16, 2020	(United States) Denver, Detroit, Miami
13	February 3, 2021	(United States) San Diego, Portland
14	May 12, 2021	(United States) Atlanta
15	May 17, 2021	(Japan) Kanazawa, Sendai
16	June 7, 2021	Spain; Continental Portugal; Gibraltar
17	September 10, 2021	Italy; San Marino
18	October 29, 2021	Andorra
19	December 9, 2021	Australia
20	April 21, 2022	(Germany) Munich; Singapore
21	May 18, 2022	(Germany) Frankfurt, Stuttgart
22	May 27, 2022	(Japan) Niigata, Sapporo, Shizuoka
23	June 16, 2022	(Germany) Cologne, Dortmund, Düsseldorf, Essen
24	June 30, 2022	(Germany) Berlin, Hamburg, Leipzig
25	July 7, 2022	Metropolitan France; New Zealand
26	July 25, 2022	Rest of Germany
27	December 15, 2022	Belgium; Israel; Liechtenstein; Luxembourg; Netherlands; Switzerland
28	March 2, 2023	Mainland Finland; Norway; Sweden
29	April 7, 2023	Croatia; Czech Republic; Hungary; Poland; Slovenia
30	May 20, 2023	(Japan) Himeji, Kitakyushu, Maebashi, Okayama
31	July 27, 2023	(United States) Dallas, Minneapolis, Tampa Bay
32	September 26, 2023	Austria; Taiwan
33	October 12, 2023	Denmark; Greece
34	October 20, 2023	Hong Kong
35	November 2, 2023	(United States) Sacramento
36	December 10, 2023	(United States) Jacksonville, Orlando
37	February 8, 2024	(Japan) Kumamoto, Utsunomiya
38	February 15, 2024	(United States) Charlotte, Raleigh
39	March 28, 2024	(United States) Austin, Salt Lake City, San Antonio, and several areas in California
40	May 17, 2024	Monaco
41	August 15, 2024	Åland
42	January 30, 2025	(United States) New Orleans
43	April 12, 2025	(United States) More areas in California
44	May 1, 2025	Rest of (Republic of Ireland) Ireland
45	August 21, 2025	Mexico City, Guadalajara, Monterrey, Puebla, Tijuana, Morelia, Ciudad Juárez, Mérida, San Luis Potosí, Hermosillo, Mexicali, Culiacán, Veracruz, Tuxtla Gutiérrez, Villahermosa, Xalapa, La Paz, Chilpancingo, Chetumal, Puerto Vallarta, San Cristóbal de las Casas, Guasave, Cozumel, Cuauhtémoc, Tampico, Oaxaca
46	November 13, 2025	(United States) Kansas City
47	March 8, 2026	(United States) More areas in Nevada, Oregon and Washington State
48	April 9, 2026	(United States) Areas in Alabama, Connecticut, Delaware, Florida, Georgia, Illinois, Indiana, Kentucky, Maine, Maryland, Massachusetts, Michigan, New Hampshire, New Jersey, New York, North Carolina, Ohio, Pennsylvania, Rhode Island, South Carolina, Tennessee, Vermont, Virginia, and West Virginia
49	April 13, 2026	(Mexico) Areas in Quintana Roo
50	April 20, 2026	(United States) More of northern Alabama
51	May 20, 2026	More areas throughout the entire United States Puerto Rico
52	August 19, 2026	Estonia; Latvia; Lithuania
53	October 9, 2026	Thailand
54	November 18, 2026	India

== Coverage ==
Look Around is available in over 100 cities and countries across North America, Europe, Asia and Australia as of 2026:

Locations with Look Around
Country	Region
Andorra	Full coverage
Australia	Full coverage
Austria	Full coverage
Belgium	Full coverage
Canada	Full coverage (Note: excluding territories)
Croatia	Full coverage
Czech Republic	Full coverage
Denmark	Full coverage (Note: excluding Faroe Islands and Greenland)
Estonia	Full coverage
Finland	Full coverage
France	Full coverage (Note: excluding territories)
Germany	Full coverage (Note: excluding smaller German islands)
Greece	Full coverage
Hong Kong	Full coverage
Hungary	Full coverage
India	Full coverage (Note: excluding Ladakh and Lakshadweep)
Ireland	Full coverage
Israel	Full coverage
Italy	Full coverage
Japan	Fukuoka, Himeji, Hiroshima, Kanazawa, Kitakyushu, Kumamoto, Kyoto, Maebashi, Nagoya, Niigata, Okayama, Osaka, Sapporo, Sendai, Shizuoka, Takamatsu, Tokyo, Utsunomiya
Latvia	Full coverage
Liechtenstein	Full coverage
Lithuania	Full coverage
Luxembourg	Full coverage
Mexico	Mexico City, Guadalajara, Monterrey, Puebla, Tijuana, Morelia, Ciudad Juárez, Mérida, San Luis Potosí, Hermosillo, Mexicali, Culiacán, Veracruz, Tuxtla Gutiérrez, Villahermosa, Xalapa, La Paz, Chilpancingo, Chetumal, Puerto Vallarta, San Cristóbal de las Casas, Guasave, Cozumel, Cuauhtémoc, Tampico, Oaxaca
Monaco	Full coverage
Netherlands	Full coverage (Note: excluding Caribbean territories)
New Zealand	Full coverage
Norway	Full coverage (Note: excluding Svalbard and Jan Mayen)
Poland	Full coverage
Portugal	Continental Portugal
San Marino	Full coverage
Singapore	Full coverage
Slovenia	Full coverage
Spain	Full coverage (Note: excluding Ceuta and Melilla)
Sweden	Full coverage
Switzerland	Full coverage
Taiwan	Full coverage
Thailand	Full coverage (Note: excluding Yala, Pattani and Narathiwat)
United Kingdom	Edinburgh, Gibraltar, London
United States	Anaheim, Albuquerque, Anchorage, Atlanta, Austin, Bakersfield, Baltimore, Birmingham, Boise, Boston, Buffalo, Charleston, Charlotte, Chattanooga, Chicago, Cincinnati, Cleveland, Columbus, Dallas, Denver, Des Moines, Detroit, El Paso, Eugene, Fairbanks, Flint, Fresno, Grand Rapids, Greensboro, Houston, Indianapolis, Jacksonville, Lansing, Las Vegas, Little Rock, Los Angeles, Louisville, Memphis, Miami, Minneapolis, Missoula, Monterey Bay, Nashville, New Orleans, New York City, Norfolk, Oahu, Oklahoma City, Orlando, Palm Springs, Pensacola, Philadelphia, Phoenix, Pittsburgh, Portland, Raleigh, Redding, Reno, Richmond, Riverside, Rochester, Sacramento, Salem, Salt Lake City, San Antonio, San Bernardino, San Diego, San Francisco Bay Area, San Juan, San Luis Obispo–Morro Bay–Paso Robles, Santa Barbara, Santa Cruz, Seattle, Southwest Florida (Fort Myers–Cape Coral–Naples; partial), Spokane, St. Louis, Tallahassee, Tampa Bay, Washington, D.C., Wichita, Yosemite Valley

== Future coverage ==
According to the company, Apple's vehicles and pedestrians have visited, or are scheduled to visit, the following countries and territories to collect imagery: (Note: These are, with the exception of Palestine, Slovakia, the United Kingdom and the United States, regions that do not yet have Apple's new map data.) (Note: While the new map covers the Palestinian Territories, Saudi Arabia, Slovakia, and Vatican City, these countries lack the Look Around feature.)

Locations visited by Apple Maps Image Collection team
Country	Vehicle	Pedestrian	iPhone/iPad
Albania	Berat County, Dibër County, Durrës County, Elbasan County, Fier County, Gjirokastër County, Korçë County, Kukës County, Lezhë County, Shkodër County, Tirana County, Vlorë County	Backpacks: Tirana County	N/A
Bosnia & Herzegovina	Bosnian-Podrinje Canton, Brčko, Canton 10, Central Bosnia Canton, Herzegovina-Neretva Canton, Posavina Canton, Sarajevo Canton, Tuzla Canton, Una-Sana Canton, West Herzegovina Canton, Zenica-Doboj Canton	Backpacks: East Herzegovina, Sarajevo Canton	N/A
Brazil	Central-West Region, North Region, Northeast Region, Southeast Region, South Region	Backpacks: Central-West Region, Northeast Region, Southeast Region, Southern Region	Transit: São Paulo and Rio de Janeiro
Bulgaria	Blagoevgrad, Burgas, Dobrich, Gabrovo, Haskovo, Kardzhali, Kyustendil, Lom Cherkovna, Lovech, Montana, Pazardzhik, Pernik, Pleven, Plovdiv, Razgrad, Ruse, Shumen, Silistra, Sliven, Smolyan, Sofia Province, Stara Zagora, Targovishte, Varna, Veliko Tarnovo, Vidin, Vratsa, Yambol	Backpacks: Sofia Province	N/A
Cyprus	Larnaca, Limassol, Nicosia, Paphos	Backpacks: Nicosia, Paphos	N/A
Iceland	Capital Region, Eastern Region, Northwestern Region, Southern Peninsula, Southern Region, West Fjords, Western Region	Backpacks: Capital Region	N/A
Japan	Aichi Prefecture, Chiba Prefecture, Ehime Prefecture, Fukuoka Prefecture, Gifu Prefecture, Gunma Prefecture, Hiroshima Prefecture, Hokkaido, Hyōgo Prefecture, Ibaraki Prefecture, Ishikawa Prefecture, Kagawa Prefecture, Kanagawa Prefecture, Kumamoto Prefecture, Kyoto Prefecture, Mie Prefecture, Miyagi Prefecture, Nagano Prefecture, Nara Prefecture, Niigata Prefecture, Okayama Prefecture, Okinawa Prefecture, Osaka Prefecture, Saitama Prefecture, Shiga Prefecture, Shizuoka Prefecture, Tochigi Prefecture, Tokyo Prefecture, Yamanashi Prefecture	Backpacks: Aichi Prefecture, Chiba Prefecture, Fukuoka Prefecture, Hiroshima Prefecture, Hokkaido, Hyōgo Prefecture, Ishikawa Prefecture, Kanagawa Prefecture, Kumamoto Prefecture, Kyoto Prefecture, Mie Prefecture, Miyagi Prefecture, Nagano Prefecture, Nara Prefecture, Okayama Prefecture, Okinawa Prefecture, Osaka Prefecture, Saitama Prefecture, Shizuoka Prefecture, Tokyo Prefecture	Transit: Aichi Prefecture, Chiba Prefecture, Fukuoka Prefecture, Hyōgo Prefecture, Ibaraki Prefecture, Kanagawa Prefecture, Kyoto Prefecture, Nara Prefecture, Osaka Prefecture, Saitama Prefecture, Shiga Prefecture, Tokyo Prefecture
Kosovo	District of Ferizaj, District of Gjakova, District of Gjilan, District of Mitrovica, District of Peja, District of Pristina, District of Prizren	N/A	N/A
Malaysia	Johor, Kedah, Kelantan, Kuala Lumpur, Labuan, Malacca, Negeri Sembilan, Pahang, Perak, Perlis, Pulau Pinang, Putrajaya, Sabah, Sarawak, Selangor, Terengganu	Backpacks: Johor, Kuala Lumpur, Malacca, Pulau Pinang, Selangor	N/A
Malta	Central Region, Gozo Region, Northern Region, South Eastern Region, Southern Region	Backpacks: Central Region, Northern Region, South Eastern Region, Southern Region	N/A
Montenegro	Andrijevica, Bar, Berane, Bijelo Polje, Budva, Cetinje, Danilovgrad, Gusinje, Herceg Novi, Kolašin, Kotor, Mojkovac, Nikšić, Petnjica, Plav, Pljevlja, Plužine, Podgorica, Rožaje, Šavnik, Tivat, Tuzi, Ulcinj, Žabljak, Zeta Municipality	Backpacks: Budva, Kotor, Podgorica	N/A
North Macedonia	Eastern Region, Northeastern Region, Pelagonia Region, Polog Region, Skopje, Skopje Region, Southeast Region, Southwestern Region, Vardar Region	Backpacks: Skopje Region	N/A
Palestine	Bethlehem, Hebron, Jenin, Jericho, Jerusalem, Nablus, Qalqilya, Ramallah, Salfit, Tubas, Tulkarm	N/A	N/A
Romania	București - Ilfov, Centru, Nord-Est, Nord-Vest, Sud - Muntenia, Sud-Est, Sud-Vest Oltenia, Vest	Backpacks: București - Ilfov	Transit: București-Ilfov
Serbia	Belgrade, Bor District, Braničevo District, Central Banat District, Jablanica District, Kolubara District, Mačva District, Moravica District, Nišava District, North Bačka District, North Banat District, Pčinja District, Pirot District, Podunavlje District, Pomoravlje District, Raška District, Rasina District, South Bačka District, South Banat District, Srem District, Šumadija District, Toplica District, Zaječar District, Zlatibor District	Backpacks: Belgrade	Transit: Belgrade
Slovakia	Banská Bystrica Region, Bratislava Region, Košice Region, Nitra Region, Prešov Region, Trenčín Region, Trnava Region, Žilina Region	Backpacks: Bratislava Region	N/A
United Arab Emirates	Ajman, Dubai, Sharjah, Fujairah, Ras Al Khaimah, Umm Al Quwain	Backpacks: Ajman, Dubai	N/A
United Kingdom	Full coverage in Channel Islands, England, Gibraltar, Isle of Man, Northern Ireland, Scotland, Wales	England, Scotland	Transit: Greater London
United States	Full coverage in all 50 U.S. states (including Guam, Puerto Rico and the U.S. Virgin Islands)	Backpacks: Alabama, Arizona, California, Colorado, Connecticut, Florida, Georgia, Hawaii, Illinois, Indiana, Kansas, Kentucky, Louisiana, Maryland, Massachusetts, Michigan, Minnesota, Missouri, Nevada, New Jersey, New Mexico, New York, North Carolina, Ohio, Oklahoma, Oregon, Pennsylvania, Rhode Island, South Carolina, Tennessee, Texas, Utah, Virginia, Washington, Washington DC, Wisconsin	iPhone/iPad: California, Texas; Transit: California, Florida, Georgia, Illinois, Massachusetts, Pennsylvania, New York, Washington, D.C., Washington State
Vietnam	Central Highlands, Mekong River Delta, North Central Coastal, Northeast, Northwest, Red River Delta, South Central Coastal, Southeast	N/A	N/A

== See also ==
- Flyover (Apple Maps)
- Detailed City Experience
- Google Street View
- List of street view services
