= Straldzha =

Straldzha Стралджа
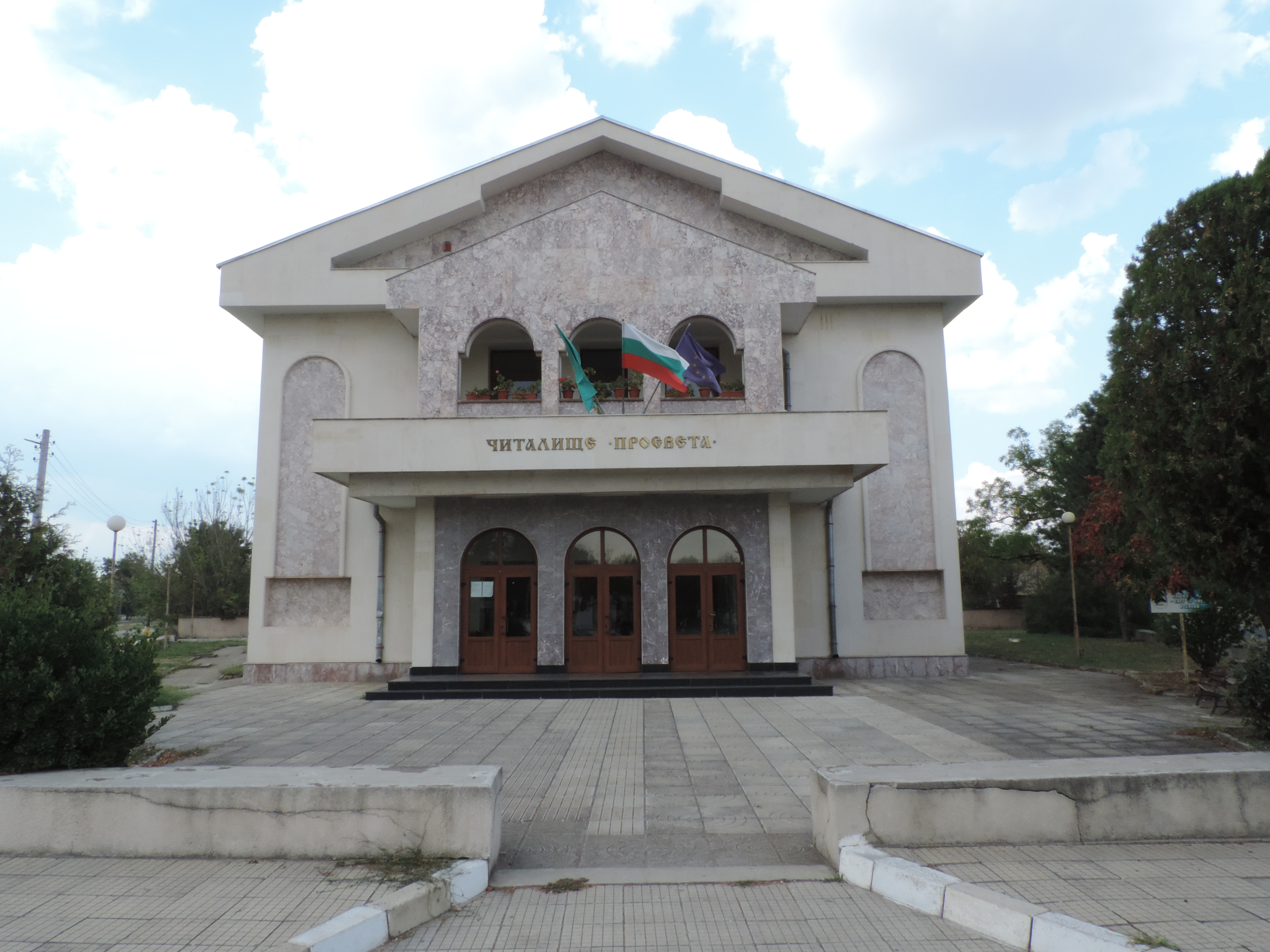

- Location of Straldzha, Bulgaria
- Coordinates: 42°36′N 26°41′E
- Country: Bulgaria
- Provinces (Oblast): Yambol Province

Government
  - Mayor: Atanas Kirov
- Elevation: 139 m (456 ft)

Population (2022)
  - Total: 6,199
- Time zone: UTC+2 (EET)
  - Summer (DST): UTC+3 (EEST)
- Postal Code: 8680
- Area codes: 04712 from Bulgaria, 003594712 from outside

Straldzha (Bulgarian: Стралджа [ˈstraɫd͡ʒɐ]) is a small town in Yambol Province, southeastern Bulgaria, situated in the Sliven Valley. It is the administrative centre of the homonymous Straldzha Municipality. As of 2022, the town had a population of 6,199.

The municipality of Straldzha is home to 12,014 people at the end of 2016: 6,326 of whom live in the city of Straldzha and 5,688 in the villages. It has a relatively high crude birth rate of 13,8‰ and a very high fertility rate of 3,01 children per woman, nearly two times higher than the national rate of 1,54 children per woman (at the end of 2016). The reason for this high fertility rate is the large concentration of ethnic Roma people in the municipality of Straldzha (nearly one-fifth of the population belong to the Romani community, which is exceeding four times the national average).

The small town is a hub for agriculture and wine production. Many residents however go to work and study in bigger cities, or abroad, in search of more opportunity.

During the communist regime, Straldzha was a growing town with many factories and workers from the nearby villages.
