= Asenovo, Yambol Province =

Asenovo
- Location of Asenovo
- Coordinates: 42°22′06″N 26°39′48″E
- Country: Bulgaria
- Provinces (Oblast): Yambol
- Elevation: 162 m (531 ft)

Population
  - Total: 93
- Time zone: UTC+2 (EET)
  - Summer (DST): UTC+3 (EEST)
- Postal Code: 8667
- Area code: 04773

Asenovo (Bulgarian: Асеново) - a village in South-Eastern Bulgaria in the Yambol Province, in the Tundzha Municipality. According to the National Institute of Statistics, in the year of 2011, the village had 93 inhabitants. The Holy Assembly Council takes place on 24 May.
