= Cerej =

Cerej Cerei
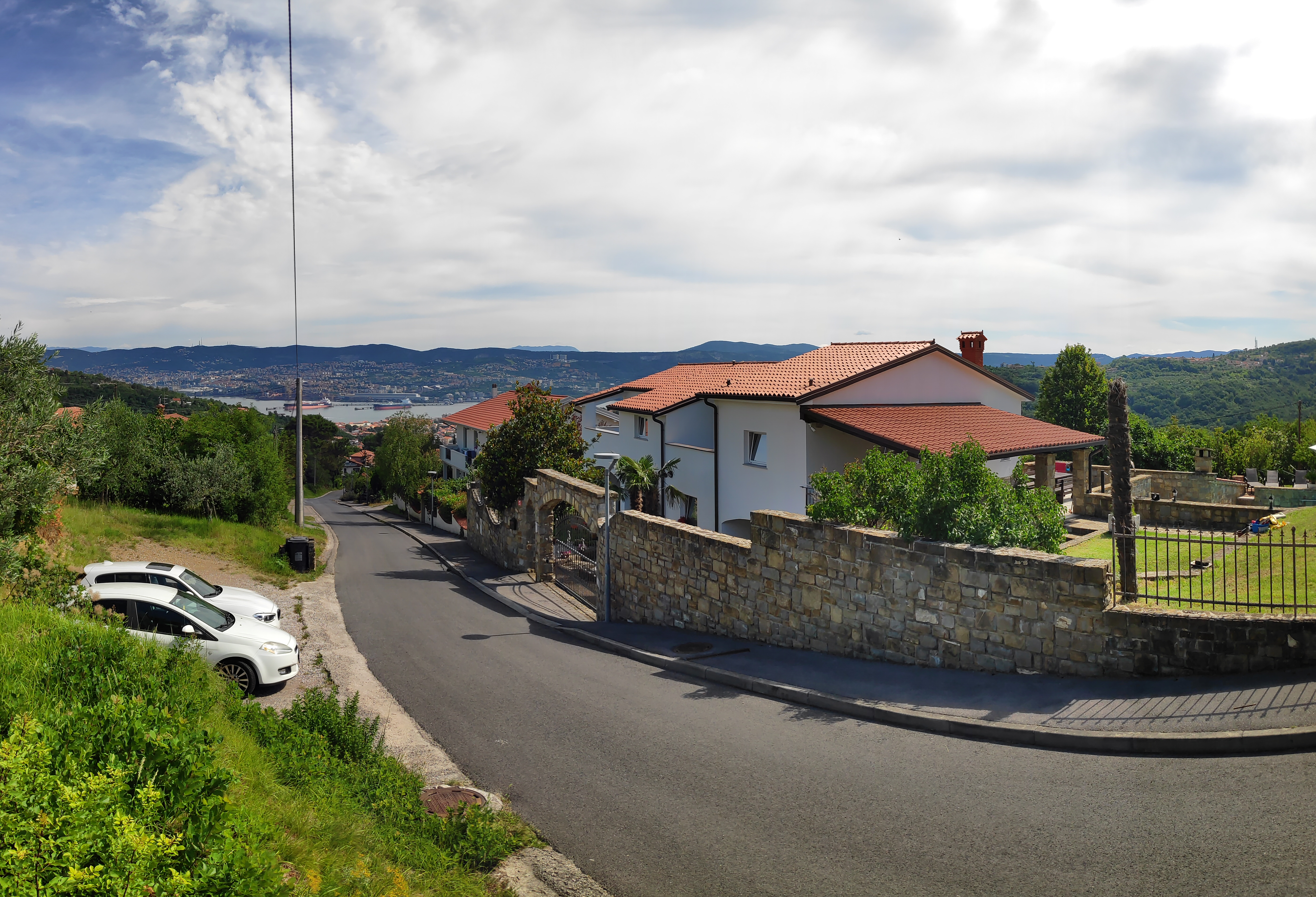

- Location in Slovenia
- Coordinates: 45°35′26.25″N 13°45′36.37″E
- Country: Slovenia
- Traditional region: Littoral
- Statistical region: Coastal–Karst
- Municipality: Koper

Area
  - Total: 0.590 km^{2} (0.228 sq mi)
- Elevation: 98.6 m (323 ft)

Population (2026)
  - Total: 128
  - Density: 217/km^{2} (560/sq mi)

Cerej (pronounced [tsɛˈɾɛi̯]; Italian: Cerei) is a settlement next to Hrvatini in the City Municipality of Koper in the Littoral region of Slovenia, right on the border with Italy. As of January 2026, the population was 128.
