= Hadzhidimitrovo =

Archaeological site near Jambol, Bulgaria

Hadzhidimitrovo (or Hadzhi Dimitrovo) is an archaeological site near the city of Jambol in the southeast of Bulgaria where polished stone tools from the Late Neolithic were found.
