= Yambol Province =

Province in southeastern Bulgaria

Coordinates: 42°25′N 26°31′E

Yambol Province Област Ямбол
- Province
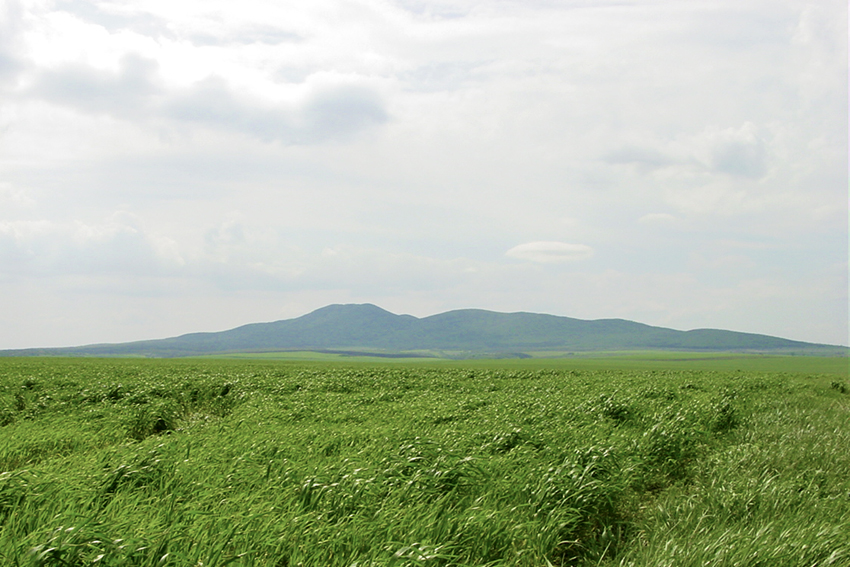
- Yambol Province

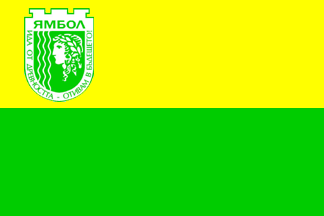
- Flag

- Location of Yambol Province in Bulgaria
- Country: Bulgaria
- Capital: Yambol
- Municipalities: 5

Government
  - Governor: Dimitar Ivanov

Area
  - Total: 3,355.5 km^{2} (1,295.6 sq mi)

Population (December 2022)
  - Total: 107,379
  - Density: 32.001/km^{2} (82.882/sq mi)
- Time zone: UTC+2 (EET)
  - Summer (DST): UTC+3 (EEST)
- License plate: У
- Website: yambol.government.bg

Yambol (Bulgarian: област Ямбол, oblast Yambol, former name Yambol okrug) is a province in southeastern Bulgaria, neighbouring Turkey to the south. It is named after its main city Yambol, while other towns include Straldzha, Bolyarovo and Elhovo. The province embraces a territory of 3,355.5 km^{2} (1,295.6 sq mi) that is divided into five municipalities with a total population, as of December 2009, of 138,429.

== Municipalities ==
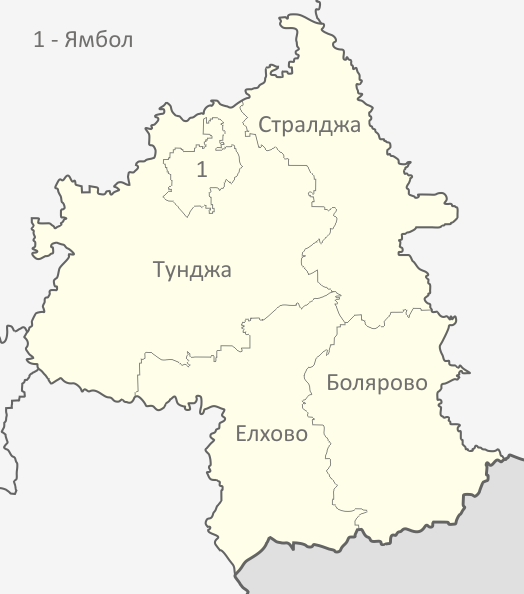
Map of Yambol Province

The Yambol province (област, oblast) contains five municipalities (общини, obshtini; singular: община, obshtina). The following table shows the names of each municipality in English and Cyrillic, the main town or village (towns are shown in bold), and the population of each as of December 2009.

Municipality	Cyrillic	Pop.	Town/Village	Pop.
Bolyarovo	Болярово	4,415	**Bolyarovo**	1,303
Elhovo	Елхово	16,757	**Elhovo**	10,553
Straldzha	Стралджа	13,655	**Straldzha**	6,021
Tundzha (rural)	Тунджа	26,428	**Yambol**	see below
Yambol (city)	Ямбол	77,174	**Yambol**	77,174

== History and background ==
The motto of the town of Yambol is "Coming from the remote past, going to the future". Archaeological findings in the area date back to the year 6000 BC, to the time of Roman Emperor Diocletian's reign when the castle, called Diospolis, was built on the location of the present modern town. The best preserved historical sites, dating back to the fifteenth century, are the bazar "Bezisten" and the mosque "Esky Djamia", which have been restored and are functioning at present. Other historical sites of interest are the prehistoric tumulus by the village of Drama, the remains of Yambol Mediaeval castle and the Monastery of the Middle Ages in Voden.

Yambol is home to the ancient settlement of Kabile, a national archaeological reserve and a nature preserved site, being the most important Thracian settlement in Bulgaria. In modern study of ancient Thrace it has already been proved that Kabile was the most prominent political, economic and religious centre from the first millennium BC. The archaeological investigations of the ancient city that have taken place in the last thirty years have revealed a great number of artefacts (stone inscriptions, coins, ceramic ware and remains of building activities) dating from times over a millennium long history. Most of the discovered artefacts have already been published and used as a data for archaeological and historical studies.

== Demographics ==
Historical population
Year	Pop.	±%
1946	211,152	—
1956	221,629	+5.0%
1965	216,963	−2.1%
1975	183,214	−15.6%
1985	183,029	−0.1%
1992	175,839	−3.9%
2001	156,070	−11.2%
2011	131,447	−15.8%
2021	109,693	−16.5%
Source: pop-stat.mashke.org

The Yambol province had a population of 156,080 (156,070 also given) according to a 2001 census, of which 49.2% were male and 50.8% were female.

As of the end of 2009, the population of the province, announced by the Bulgarian National Statistical Institute, numbered 138,429 of which 27% are inhabitants aged over 60 years.

=== Ethnic groups ===
Ethnic groups in Yambol Province (2011 census)
Ethnic group	Percentage
Bulgarians	86.9%
Romani	8.5%
Turks	2.9%
others and indefinable	1.7%

Total population (2011 census): 131 447
Ethnic groups (2011 census): Identified themselves: 123 062 persons:

- Bulgarians: 106 884 (86,85%)
- Romani: 10 433 (8,48%)
- Turks: 3 600 (2,93%)
- Others and indefinable: 2 145 (1,74%)

=== Religion ===
Religions in Yambol Province (2001 census)
Religious group	Percentage
Orthodox Christian	88.2%
Muslim	2.3%
Protestant Christian	1.8%
Roman Catholic Christian	0.1%
others and indefinable	7.5%

Religious adherence in the province according to 2001 census:

Census 2001
religious adherence	population	%
Orthodox Christians	137,655	88.20%
Muslims	3,700	2.37%
Protestants	2,741	1.76%
Roman Catholics	224	0.14%
Other	916	0.59%
Religion not mentioned	10,834	6.94%
**total**	**156,070**	100%

== Famous residents ==
Yambol is the native place of popular artists George Papazov and John Popov and sumo wrestler Aoiyama. The computer inventor John Atanasoff has family roots in the district – his father was born in a village Boyadjik, which is near Yambol.

== Topology and natural resources ==
The Tundja River, the fourth of its size with an earth embankment, flows through the district, and mineral water wells are found near the village of Stefan Caradjovo. The territory of the area covers the middle part of the river valley, the Bakadjitsi, parts of the Svetiliiski, Derventski and Manastirski uplands, with the hilly plain relief predominating 100–150m above sea level. The northern areas of Tundja valley are characterized by a transcontinental climate, while the southern parts have a typical continental/Mediterranean climate. The average annual temperatures are between 12 and 12.5 °C. Agricultural lands take 76.9% of the whole district territory, and the forests 15.5% of it. The wood resources include elm, willow, poplar and oak.

== See also ==
- Yambol Province on Facebook
- Provinces of Bulgaria
- List of villages in Yambol Province
