= Balchik Airfield =

General aviation airfield and reduced former military airbase in Bulgaria

- Летище Балчик
- Balchik, Bulgaria
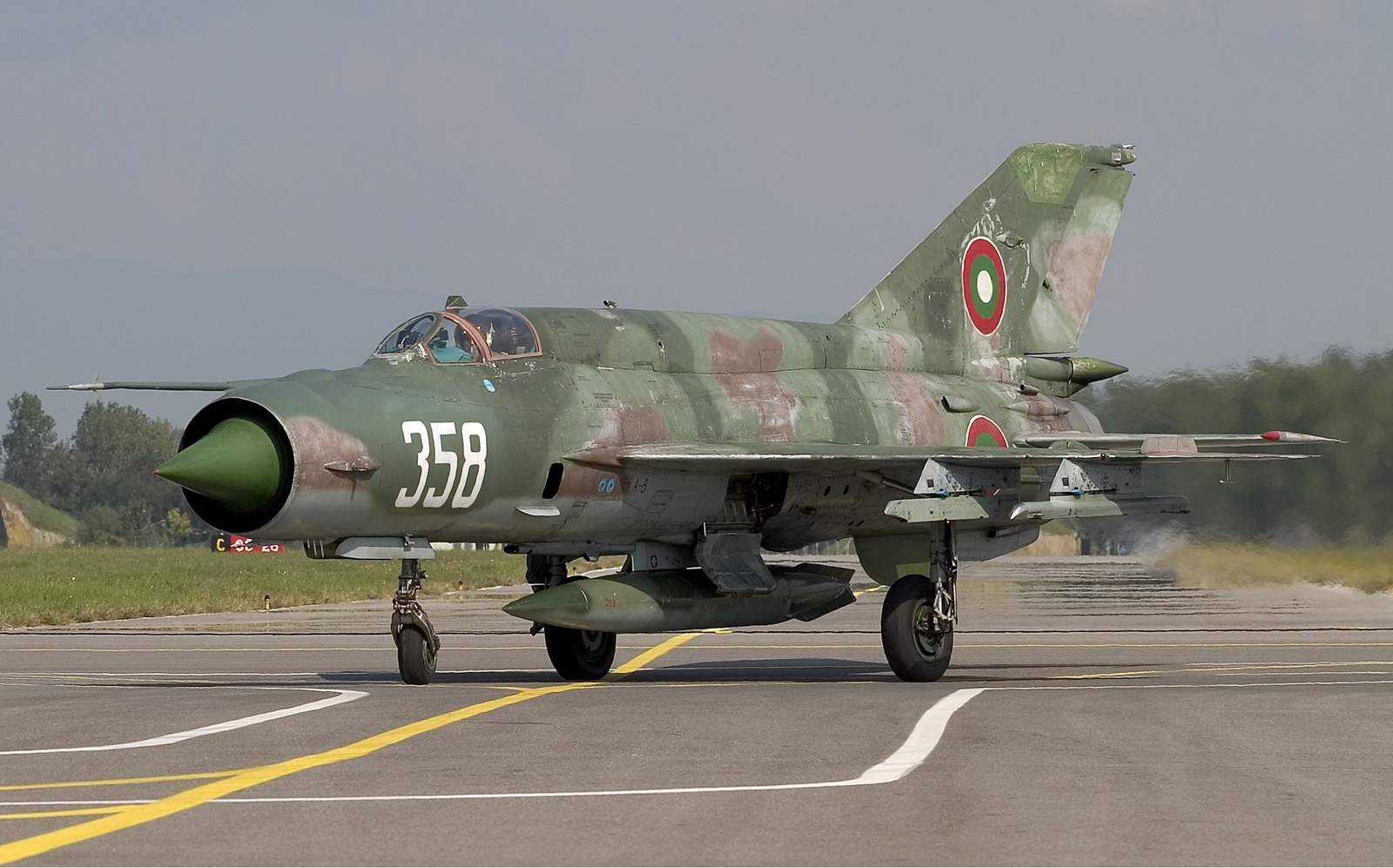
- Bulgarian Air Force MiG-21bis aircraft operated at Balchik airbase until 1998

Site information
- Type: Airfield
- Owner: Bulgarian Government
- Operator: Sofia Airport; Bulgarian Air Force
- Controlled by: Bulgarian Air Force
- Website: Official website

Location
- Location within Bulgaria
- Coordinates: 43°25′28″N 028°10′51″E

Site history
- In use: 1941–present

Airfield information
- Identifiers: ICAO: LBWB
- Elevation: 196 metres (643 ft) AMSL
Runways
Direction	Length and surface
15/33	2,483 metres (8,146 ft) Concrete
- Source: Sofia Airport EAD

Balchik Airport (Bulgarian: Летище Балчик) (ICAO: LBWB) is a general aviation airfield and reduced former military airbase in the town of Balchik, northeast Bulgaria, on the Black Sea coast. In August 2011 the Bulgarian government transformed Balchik airbase from a military to a civilian airport and it became part of the assets of the state-owned company Sofia Airport EAD.

Due to its strategic location, the former military airfield has been home to different military aviation formations and performed different types of tasks related to the country's defence. Despite major structural changes in the Bulgarian Air Force, the disbandment and closure of military airbases, Balchik airbase continues to perform reduced defence-related tasks.

The intention to organize civil flights at Balchik airfield and its use as both a military airbase and a civilian airport established Balchik as a non-commercial regional transport hub, providing jobs and better use of the resources in this region. On 3 May 2012 at 19:06 the first private civil flight "Prague-Varna-Balchik" landed, via neighbouring Varna Airport due to the lack of passport border control at Balchik airport. The airport's general aviation civil aviation license at this stage is for non-commercial flights with a maximum takeoff weight up to 5.7 tonnes and for flights within the European Union 48 hours prior notice is required for the airport to provide a border police control presence; this is due to Bulgaria currently not being a member of the EU Schengen Area.

== Description ==
Balchik airfield is located 2 kilometres northwest of the centre of Balchik on an area of 3700 decares of flat terrain, at an altitude of 188 metres and the runway is about one kilometre from the coastline. Due to this, its strategic location is called "the unsinkable aircraft carrier of Bulgaria". Its location allows when taking off in the direction of the Black Sea to immediately begin the descent to 150–180 metres, which makes it unique in Bulgaria. The runway has a length of 2483 x 52 metres.

The military airbase operated until 1998 as the 6th Fighter Air Base of the Bulgarian Air Force, when the last MiG-21bis and Aero L-29 Delfíns were transferred to the 26th Reconnaissance Air Base, ending the base's period as a front-line military airbase. Since 1998, the airbase has been active as the 6th Aviation Material Preservation Base for tasks related to other operating military airbases with fighter jets such as the MiG-29, Su-25 and Albatros L-39ZA trainer, transport/utility aircraft such as the Alenia C-27J Spartan or helicopters such as the Mil Mi-24V Hind E, Mil Mi-17 and Eurocopter AS532 Cougar. The reduced staff keep the airfield infrastructure ready to accept military aircraft participating in tactical training flights in naval exercises, parachuting, airlifts, air-sea rescue and training at the Shabla air force air gunnery firing range.

== History ==
The first information about the establishment of an airfield in the region is from 1 July 1935. The town of Balchik was at that time within the Kingdom of Romania. The established civil airfield served the Balchik-Constanţa-Bucharest air route and was probably established by the will of the Romanian royal dynasty; to use the resort facilities of the region and the summer palace residence of Queen Marie of Romania, Balchik Palace is located 2 kilometres south-west of Balchik. The air traffic was carried out by several 6-seater Junkers (Junkers F 13) aircraft.

By virtue of the Treaty of Craiova in 1940, Southern Dobruja was returned to Bulgaria. The departing Romanian authorities had practically destroyed everything related to the airfield - the equipment had been removed, the windows were broken or the buildings half-destroyed, the water wells blocked. Even the runway was ploughed across. The following year, the Bulgarian government approved plans by the defence ministry to use the airfield for military purposes.

=== Military air base ===
The first military aircraft based on Balchik airfield were in fact several aircraft of types Heinkel He 111 and Junkers Ju 88 of the German Luftwaffe, mainly for reconnaissance flights during World War Two. The Luftwaffe also rebuilt the airfield. With the German invasion of the Soviet Union in Operation Barbarossa on 22 June 1941, this small German military unit left the borders of Bulgaria.

- The first Bulgarian aviation formation was the Air Gunnery School, stationed on 24 May 1941 and operating until 9 September 1944.
- On 4 August 1941 Balchik airfield was home to 5 Czechoslovak-built Letov-Šmolik Š-328 aircraft, sold to Bulgaria by Germany after its annexation of Czechoslovakia and its industry. The aircraft, assigned to the Bulgarian 2nd Air Regiment, provided anti-submarine defence for German ship transports travelling in the Black Sea from Constanţa to the Bosphorus.
- On 1 October 1941, the Galata Fighter Wing was formed on the basis of and in pursuance of a confidential decree No. I-2733 of the Bulgarian Air Force Headquarters. The Bulgarian 682nd Fighter Squadron of the 6th Fighter Regiment was based at Balchik airfield with a complement of German Messerschmitt Bf 109E aircraft and is considered the birth date of Balchik military airbase.
- From May 1945 to September 1946, in connection with a re-armament, almost all Bulgarian fighter pilots underwent training on the Soviet Yakovlev Yak-9 fighter plane, using the base at Balchik airfield.
- In September 1947 the formation of a Mine-Torpedo Aviation Regiment began, and in 1951 the regiment grew into the 3rd Bomber Air Division. On 13 April 1955, the division was disbanded.
- On 18 October 1955, the 27th Fighter Regiment transferred from Bezmer Air Base to Balchik air base, marking the beginning of the fighter regiment's home base. The 27th Fighter Regiment disbanded and ceased to exist in the air force on 1 May 1963.
- After a reorganization, the 3rd Fighter Squadron was stationed at Balchik airbase armed with the MiG-17F aircraft, as part of the 15th Fighter Regiment located at Ravnets Air Base. In 1970 the Balchik squadron changed its numbering and became the 2nd Fighter Squadron.
- The military airfield operated until 1998 when the last MiG-21bis and L-29s were transferred to other military bases, ending the base's 43-year run as an airfield with fighter aircraft. Since 1998, the airfield has been activated for tasks related to other active airbases with fighter, tanker, or helicopter aviation. The reduced staff keeps the airfield infrastructure ready to receive aircraft involved in training flights for maritime training, parachute jumps, transport aviation, providing the firing range "Shabla", etc. [5].

== Joint troop formation (1941-1944) ==
To ensure the protection of German transports during their passage from Kyustendja to the Bosphorus, a joint troop formation was established on August 4, 1941, under the command of Captain Koychev. This combined force included a squadron from the 223rd Platoon of the 2nd Army Air Regiment, equipped with five Letov-Šmolik Š-328 Vrana aircraft manufactured in the Czechoslovak Republic, stationed at Balchik airfield.

To effectively cover the entire Bulgarian coast, an additional four Vrana aircraft were deployed at Sarafovo airfield near Burgas, forming a squadron of the 333rd Platoon of the 3rd Army Air Regiment. Although lacking specialized anti-submarine warfare equipment, the Vrana aircraft were armed with 4 to 6 bombs and four machine guns, making them capable of deterring submarines and safeguarding convoys.

The primary objective of this formation, stationed at two locations within the designated area of responsibility, was to provide consistent security along the route from Kyustendja to the mouth of the Kamchia River and onwards to the Rezovska River. While operationally subordinate to the army headquarters, specific tasks related to the protection of transports were coordinated with the representative of the German General Command Post at Cape Galata.

== See also ==
- List of Bulgarian Air Force bases
- List of Bulgarian military bases
- Graf Ignatievo Air Base
- Ravnets Air Base
- Bezmer Air Base
- Cheshnegirovo Air Base
- Dobroslavtsi Air Base
- Dobrich Air Base
- Gabrovnitsa Air Base
- Uzundzhovo Air Base
- Bulgarian VIP State Aviation Operator (formerly Aviation Detachment 28)
- Military of Bulgaria
- List of joint US-Bulgarian military bases
