= List of MiG-23 operators =

This is a list of Mikoyan-Gurevich MiG-23 operators. Active operators are in bold

== Operators ==
=== Military ===
As of 2026, the MiG-23 is operated by the air forces of Angola, Ethiopia, Libya, North Korea, and Sudan.

==== Afghanistan ====
The Afghan Air Force received a total of 53 MiG-23MS between 1988 and 1990 following the Soviet withdrawal from Afghanistan. Most aircraft were shot down or destroyed on the ground during the Afghan Civil War.

==== Algeria ====
The Algerian Air Force (Force Aerienne Algerienne) received a total of around 80 MiG-23s of various marks from the Soviet Union, with deliveries beginning in 1979 and all aircraft retired by 2004.

- 4^{e} Escadre de Chasse-Bombardement, Ourgla
- 21^{e} Escadre de Chasse-Bombardement, Laghouat
  - 27^{e} Escadron d'Attaque (MiG-23BN)
  - 28^{e} Escadron d'Interception (MiG-23MS, MiG-23MF, MiG-23UB)

==== Angola ====
The Angolan People's Air Force (FAPA) received at least 80 MiG-23MLs from the Soviet Union. Additionally, aircraft operated by the Cuban Air Force and later Executive Outcomes mercenary pilots flew from Angolan bases. After the change of government in 1992, the Angolan MiG-23s were stored until 2005, when they were refurbished in Ukraine and upgraded to MiG-23MLD standard. Around 22 remain in service today.

- Angolan People's Air Force (FAPA)
  - 25th Air Combat Fighter Regiment
    - 12th Fighter Squadron (MiG-23ML, MiG-23UB)
    - 13th Fighter Squadron (MiG-23ML, MiG-23UB)
- **Angolan National Air Force (FANA)**
  - **25th Air Combat Fighter Regiment**, Kuito
    - **12th Fighter Squadron (MiG-23MLD, MiG-23UB)**
    - **13th Fighter Squadron (MiG-23MLD, MiG-23UB)**

==== Belarus ====
Various units of both the Soviet Air Defence Forces and Soviet Tactical Aviation became part of the Belarusian Air Force (VPS) upon the USSR's dissolution. These included a single unit of MiG-23MLD fighters, as well as units operating other aircraft such as Sukhoi Su-27 fighters and Sukhoi Su-24 bombers, which retained MiG-23UB trainers on strength as trainers. All MiG-23s were retired from Belarusian service by 2001.

- VPS
  - 201st IAP, Minsk (MiG-23MLD, MiG-23UB)
  - 116th BAP
    - Proficiency training flight operating MiG-23UB
  - 927th IAP, Byaroza (MiG-23UB)

==== Bulgaria ====
The Bulgarian Air Force began operating the MiG-23 in 1976. All aircraft were retired by 2004.

- Bulgarian Air Force (1978-1992)
  - 25th IBAP / IBAB, Cheshnegirovo (MiG-23BN, MiG-23UB)
  - 18th IAP, Dobroslavtsi (MiG-23MF, MiG-23UB)
  - 26th Reconnaissance Aviation Regiment, Tolbukhin (MiG-23MLD)
- Bulgarian Air Force (1992-2001)
  - 1st Fighter Base, Dobroslavtsi (MiG-23BN, MiG-23MF, MG-23MLD, MiG-23UB)
- Bulgarian Air Force (2001-2004)
  - 1st Squadron, Graf Ignatievo (MiG-23MF, MiG-23UB)

==== Côte d'Ivoire ====
The Ivorian Air Force purchased several MiG-23MLAE-2 fighters from a Bulgarian company. These were never flown in combat, and were impounded in Togo shortly after delivery at the request of the French government.

- Ivorian Air Force, Félix-Houphouët-Boigny International Airport (MiG-23MLAE-2)

==== Cuba ====
Cuba introduced it to supplement the MiG-21 and replace the MiG-15 and MiG-17. Receipts began from the Soviet Union on June 6, 1968, and at that time the fighter-bomber type MiG-23BN Frogger H x 14 and the two-seat trainer type MiG-23UB Frogger C x 2 were introduced. was. It is said that MiG-23MS was also introduced at this time, but it is unclear. On October 3 of the same year, the first naval exercise in history was held. In 1982, an additional 14 MiG-23BNs were deployed, and in 1983, an additional 17 aircraft were deployed. At this stage, the number of MiG-23BN increased to 45 aircraft. Furthermore, 2 MiG-23UBs were added, bringing the number of MiG-23UBs to 4. In 1984, 12 MiG-23MF Frogger B fighter aircraft were imported. Subsequently, towards the end of the 1980s, 54 MiG-23ML Frogger G multi-role fighter aircraft and seven MiG-23UM Frogger C two-seat trainer aircraft were introduced. This expanded MiG-23 force was also dispatched to the Angola civil war and used in air combat. However, with the collapse of the Soviet Union in 1991, the supply of parts was disrupted, and the number of aircraft in operation decreased. In 2026 the Cuban Air Force retired all of their fixed-wing aircraft.

- Cuban Revolutionary Air and Air Defense Force
  - Mano de Defensa Aerea
    - Zona Aerea Oeste
      - 2^{a} Brigada de Guardia "Playa Giron"
        - 23^{o} Regimiento de Caza, San Julián
          - 232^{o} Escuadron de Caza, San Julián (MiG-23MF, MiG-23ML, MiG-23UB)
  - Mando Aereo Tactico
    - 14^{o} Regimiento de Apoyo Tactico, Santa Clara (MiG-23BN) (FUERA DE SERVICIO)
      - 141^{o} Escuadron de Apoyo Tactico, Santa Clara (MiG-23BN) (FUERA DE SERVICIO)
1. incomplete

==== Democratic Republic of the Congo ====
- Congo Air Force, Kinshasa N'djili Airport (MiG-23MS, MiG-23UB)

==== Egypt ====
Egypt has been major operator of mig 23

==== Iraq ====
During the Iran-Iraq War, Iraq imported and operated 20 MiG-23MS Flogger-E, 120 MiG-23BN Flogger-H, 18 MiG-23MF Flogger-B, 54 MiG-23ML Flogger-G, and 21 MiG-23UB Flogger-C aircraft from the Soviet Union. Many were destroyed on the ground or fled to Iran during the 1991 Gulf War. The last aircraft was lost in the 2003 Iraq War.

==== Kazakhstan ====
Upon gaining independence from the Soviet Union, the Kazakhstan air force inherited several MiG-23MLD fighters as well as MiG-23UB trainers integrated into MiG-27 squadrons. The MLDs were retired by 1999, but MiG-23UBs remained in active service as late as February 2023. By February 2024, the last 2 MiG-2UBs were withdrawn from service and put on sale. For information on the Mikoyan MiG-27s in service with the Kazakh air force, see List of MiG-27 operators.

- Kazakhstan Air Force (1991-2000)
  - 129th APIB, Taldykorgan (MiG-23UB)
  - 134th APIB, Zhangiztobe (MiG-23UB)
  - 715th IAP, Loogovaya (MiG-23M, MiG-23MLD, MiG-23UB)
- **Republic of Kazakhstan Air Defence Force (2000–2023)**
  - **604th Aviation Base, Taldykorgan (MiG-23UB)**

==== Soviet Union ====
- **PVO** (Soviet Air Defence Forces)
  - Direct Reporting Units
    - 2179th BRS / 4884th BRS, Bobrovka
    - 148th TsBP i PLS, Savasleyka
    - 18th TsBP, Krasnovodsk
    - 116th UTsBP, Astrakhan
    - 234th UTsBP, Sary-Shagan
      - 678th Zabaikal'sky GvSIAP, Priozyorsk-6
    - Armavir Red Banner VVAUL, Armavir
      - 713th UAP, Armavir
      - 761st Polotskiy UAP, Maikop
    - Stavropol' VVAULSh
      - 218th UAP, Salsk
- **VVS** (Tactical Aviation)
  - Direct Reporting Units
    - 4th TsBP i PLS, Lipetsk
      - 91st IISAP, Lipetsk
      - 455th IISAP, Lipetsk
    - 760th UAP
    - 1080th UATs PLS, Borisoglebsk
      - 1st GvIAPIB, Lebazh'ye
      - 343rd IIAP, Bagai-Baranovka, Saratov
    - Chernigov VVAUL
      - 701st UAP, Pevtsy
    - GNIKI VVS
      - 333rd OIAP, Vladimirovka
    - 4020th BRD, Lipetsk
    - 4215th BRS, Dmitryevka
  - Moscow Military District
    - 9th IAD, Kubinka
      - 234th 'Prooskorovskiy' GvIAP, Kubinka
      - 32nd GVIAP, Shatalovo
  - Baltic Military District
    - 15th Air Army
  - Belorussian Military District
    - 26th Air Army
  - Carpathian Military District
    - 14th Air Army, Lvov
  - Central Asian Military District
    - 73rd Air Army, Tashkent
  - Far Eastern Military District
    - 1st Air Army, Khabarovsk
- **Soviet Naval Aviation**
  - Pacific Fleet
    - 169th GvSAP
      - 169th GvOSAP, Cam Ranh, Vietnam
  - Northern Fleet
    - 88th OMAPIB
  - Black Sea Fleet
    - 841st MAPIB

==== Sri Lanka ====
The Sri Lanka Air Force operated a single MiG-23UB attached to the No. 12 Squadron SLAF as a conversion trainer for its fleet of MiG-27s from 2007 to 2019.

==== Syria ====
Syrian Arab Air Force: 87 MiG-23 were in service as of December 2024. The Syrian government of Al-Assad fell to rebels in late 2024, and the Syrian Arab Air Force was dismantled. It was re-established as Syrian Air Force, but the revolution, and the Israeli air strikes that followed it, wrecked havoc in the inventory of the Air Force. At least 60 MiG-23s were destroyed during Operation Bashan Arrow according to Israeli claims. In late 2025, the World Air Forces publication by FlightGlobal, which tracks the aircraft inventories of world's air forces and publishes its counts annually, removed all Syrian Air Force's aircraft from their World Air Forces 2026 report. It is thus questionable if the Syrian Air Force has any flying aircraft in their inventory, and in particular, any MiG-23, as of December 2025.

==== Turkmenistan ====
After Turkmenistan's declaration of independence in 1991, the Turkmen Air Force inherited a number of MiG-23s from the Soviet 73rd Air Army, which remained in use until 2000.

- Turkmenistan Air Force
  - 55th IAP PVO, Nebit-Dag (MiG-23P, MiG-23UB)
  - 107th IAP PVO, Akdepe (MiG-23P, MiG-23UB)
  - 689th GvIAP, Türkmenbaşy (MiG-23P, MiG-23UB)
  - VVS depot, Serdar (MiG-23M, MiG-23MLD, MiG-23P, MiG-23UB)

==== Ukraine ====
Between 1992 and 2001, the Ukrainian Air Force operated around 200 MiG-23s, both single-seaters and MiG-23UB trainers.

- Ukrainian Air Force
  - Southern Air Defence Region
    - 737th VAP, Chervonoglinskoye (MiG-23M, MiG-23MLD)
  - Western Air Defence Region
    - 179th VAP, Stryi (MiG-23M, MiG-23MLD)
    - 894th VAP, Ozerne (MiG-23M, MiG-23MLD)
  - 114th VAP, Ivano-Frankivsk (MiG-23UB)
  - 642nd GvVAP, Martynivske (MiG-23UB)

==== Zimbabwe ====
The manner in which the Air Force of Zimbabwe received its MiG-23s is unknown, with some sources suggesting that they were donated by Libya while others say that the aircraft were acquired from the Democratic Republic of Congo after a failed Zimbabwean attempt to train Congolese pilots on the aircraft, which were donated by Libya.

3 in service as of December 2024. All retired as of 2026.

=== Evaluation Only ===
==== China ====
Six MiG-23s of various models were purchased by the Chinese government from Egypt during the 1970s.

- People's Liberation Army Air Force (MiG-23MS, MiG-23BN, MiG-23UB)

=== Civilian ===
==== Angola ====
Several MiG-23s were flown and operated by Ibis Air on behalf of Executive Outcomes mercenaries and the Angolan government during the Angolan Civil War.

==== United States ====
There are 11 civilian-owned MiG-23s registered in the United States of America according to the FAA. These include:

- Two ex-Czech aircraft, N51734 and N5106E, registered for civilian use in the United States and based at New Castle Airport in Wilmington, Delaware.
- An ex-Bulgarian VVS aircraft, N923UB, which was operational and on display at the Cold War Air Museum near Dallas, Texas. N923UB was destroyed on August 13, 2023, while performing at the 2023 Thunder Over Michigan airshow at Willow Run Airport. The pilots sustained minor injuries, and the plane narrowly missed an apartment building. The preliminary NTSB report suggests the rear seat passenger ejected both crewmembers while the pilot troubleshot an engine problem as the aircraft returned to land. An interview with that passenger (also a MiG-23 pilot) suggested that the pilot may have become "task saturated" as the plane lost speed and altitude and was near the edge of the envelope for a safe ejection.
