= Vrazhdebna Air Base =

Military air base in Bulgaria

- Авиобаза Враждебна
- Sofia, Bulgaria
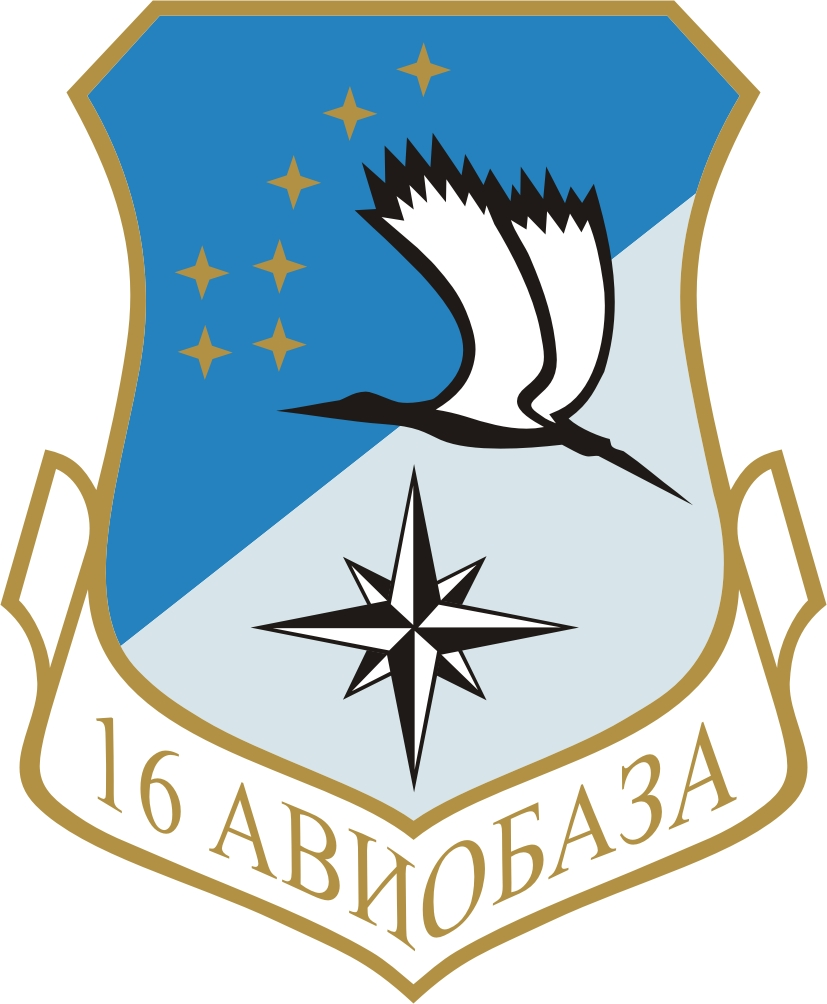
- Emblem of the Vrazhdebna Air Base

Site information
- Type: Military Air Base
- Owner: Sofia Airport
- Operator: Bulgarian Air Force
- Controlled by: Bulgarian Air Force

Location
- Location within Bulgaria
- Coordinates: 42°41′43″N 23°26′23″E

Site history
- Built: 1937
- In use: 1994–present

Garrison information
- Occupants: 16th Transport Squadron

Airfield information
- Identifiers: IATA: SOF, ICAO: LBSF
- Elevation: 532 metres (1,745 ft) AMSL
Runways
Direction	Length and surface
09/27	3,600 metres (11,800 ft) Asphalt
- Source: Sofia International Airport (Vrazhdebna)

Vrazhdebna Air Base (Bulgarian: Авиобаза Враждебна, romanized: Aviobaza Vraždebna) or 16th Transport Air Base is a military air base, located on the site of Sofia Airport. The air base functions as a hub for the 16th Transport Squadron of the BAF.

== History ==
"Vrazhdebna" is the original name for Sofia Airport, used since its establishment in 1937. The name is derived from the nearby village of Vrazhdebna (now a suburb of Sofia).

Although the name, in modern Bulgarian, can be translated to mean "hostile", the actual origin is disputed, with some claiming that it was named after a founder named Vrazhil, while other sources claim it is derived from the Old Bulgarian "vrazhdenie" (враждение), meaning "persecution".

Although various military transportation units, have been based at the airport since the late 1940s, it was not until 1994 when a separate military unit (16th Transport Air Base) was established. Both Sofia Airport and 16th TAB carry the official name "Vrazhdebna".

== Units ==
Until 1950 it was the hub for the 14th Air Transport Regiment, which included mostly German aircraft (Junkers Ju 52, Junkers A 35). After 1950 it was renamed to 16th Transport Squadron and was equipped with Lisunov Li-2 transport aircraft.

On some occasions Vrazhdebna Air Base also houses civilian Aviation Detachment 28 aircraft, which carry senior members of the Bulgarian government.

== See also ==
- Dobroslavtsi Air Base
- Cheshnegirovo Air Base
- Gabrovnitsa Air Base
- Uzundzhovo Air Base
- Graf Ignatievo Air Base
- Bezmer Air Base
- Dobrich Air Base
- Ravnets Air Base
- Balchik Air Base
- List of Bulgarian Air Force bases
- The Bulgarian Cosmonauts
- List of joint US-Bulgarian military bases
