= 10th Composite Aviation Corps =

Military formation of the Bulgarian Air Force

The 10th Composite Aviation Corps (10ти Смесен Авиационен Корпус) was a military formation of the Bulgarian Air Force. Its headquarters was in Plovdiv, and it was active from 1961 to the late 1980s.

It was established in September 1961 and its first commander was Major-General Simeon Simeonov. The new corps headquarters was mainly composed of officers from the command of 2nd Air Defence Corps (in Yambol) and from the command of the just disbanded 10th Fighter Air Division in Graf Ignatievo, hence the number. It was decided that Plovdiv Airport was to be the headquarters of the new formation. Parallel to the formation of the corps commenced the formation of 44th Helicopter Air Regiment, also at the Plovdiv airport. In 1961 the air corps included:

- two fighter air regiments (15th FAR in Ravnets and 21st in Uzundzhovo), flying MiG-15s, 17s and 19s
- two fighter-bomber air regiments (22nd FBAR in Bezmer and 25th Fighter-Bomber Aviation Regiment at Cheshnegirovo Air Base), flying MiG-15s and 17s
- 26th Reconnaissance Air Regiment (in Tolbukhin), flying MiG-15bis and Il-28s
- one transport air regiment (16th RAR in Vrazhdebna), flying Li-2s and Il-14s
- 44th Helicopter air regiment (in Plovdiv), initially flying three Mi-4s and 4 Mi-1s
- signals battalion
- 10th Radiotechnical Battalion
- 19th Fighter Air Regiment was included temporarily at Graf Ignatievo, flying MiG-19S/PMs

The Corps was still active as of 1 June 1995 (IISS MB 95-96, p.81). However, it was disestablished over the next year or two to become the Tactical Aviation Command.

== List of units and formations 1988 ==
- Headquarters (Щаб на 10ти Смесен Авиационен Корпус (Щаб 10ти САК)), Plovdiv airfield
- Command Post, Plovdiv Airfield
- Kolyu Ganchevo Air Base (Stara Zagora)
  - 13th Helicopter Air Regiment of Combat Helicopters (13ти Вертолетен Авиационен Полк - Бойни Вертолети (13ти ВАП - БВ))
    - 1/13th Attack Helicopter Air Squadron, flying Mil Mi-24D
    - 2/13th Attack Helicopter Air Squadron, flying Mi-24D/V
  - 42nd Independent Aviation Technical Battalion (42ри Отделен Авио-технически Батальон (42ри ОАТБ))
  - 21st Independent Battalion for Signals and Radio- and Lighting Technical Support (21ви Отделен Батальон за Свръзки и Радиосветотехническо Осигуряване (21ви ОБРСТО))
- Graf Ignatievo Airfield (near Plovdiv)
  - 19th Fighter Air Regiment (19ти Изтребителен Авиационен Полк (19ти ИАП))
    - 1/19th Fighter Air Squadron, flying MiG-21bis/UM
    - 2/19th Fighter Air Squadron, flying MiG-21bis/UM
  - 39th Independent Aviation Technical Battalion (39ти Отделен Авио-технически Батальон (39ти ОАТБ))
  - 19th Independent Battalion for Signals and Radio- and Lighting Technical Support (19ти Отделен Батальон за Свръзки и Радиосветотехническо Осигуряване (19ти ОБРСТО))
- Uzundzhovo Airfield (near Haskovo)
  - 21st Fighter Air Regiment (21ви Изтребителен Авиационен Полк (21ви ИАП))
    - 1/21st Fighter Air Squadron, flying MiG-21MF/UM
    - 2/21st Fighter Air Squadron, flying MiG-21MF/UM
  - 81st Independent Aviation Technical Battalion (39ти Отделен Авио-технически Батальон (39ти ОАТБ))
  - 21st Independent Battalion for Signals and Radio- and Lighting Technical Support (21ви Отделен Батальон за Свръзки и Радиосветотехническо Осигуряване (21ви ОБРСТО))
- Bezmer Airfield (near Yambol)
- 22nd Fighter-Bomber Air Regiment (22ри Изтребително-бомбардировъчен Авиационен Полк (22ри ИБАП))
  - 1/22nd Fighter-Bomber Air Squadron, flying Su-25K/UBK
  - 2/22nd Fighter-Bomber Air Squadron, flying Su-25K/UBK
- ? Independent Aviation Technical Battalion (? Отделен Авио-технически Батальон (? ОАТБ))
- 22nd Independent Battalion for Signals and Radio- and Lighting Technical Support (22ри Отделен Батальон за Свръзки и Радиосветотехническо Осигуряване (22ри ОБРСТО))
- Cheshnegirovo (Sadovo) Airfield (near Plovdiv)
  - 25th Fighter-Bomber Air Regiment (25ти Изтребително-бомбардировъчен Авиационен Полк (25ти ИБАП))
    - 1/25th Fighter-Bomber Air Squadron, flying MiG-23BN/UB
    - 2/25th Fighter-Bomber Air Squadron, flying MiG-23BN/UB
  - ? Independent Aviation Technical Battalion (? Отделен Авио-технически Батальон (? ОАТБ))
  - 25th Independent Battalion for Signals and Radio- and Lighting Technical Support (25ти Отделен Батальон за Свръзки и Радиосветотехническо Осигуряване (25ти ОБРСТО))
- Tolbukhin Airfield (present day Dobrich)
  - 26th Reconnaissance Air Regiment (26ти Разузнавателен Авиационен Полк (26ти РАП))
    - 1/26th Reconnaissance Air Squadron, flying MiG-21R/F-13 (R)/US
    - 2/26th Reconnaissance Air Squadron, flying Su-22M4, Su-22UM3K
    - Independent Air Flight for Operational Reconnaissance, flying MiG-25RBT, MiG-25RU
  - 30th Independent Aviation Technical Battalion (30ти Отделен Авио-технически Батальон (30ти ОАТБ))
  - 26th Independent Battalion for Signals and Radio- and Lighting Technical Support (26ти Отделен Батальон за Свръзки и Радиосветотехническо Осигуряване (26ти ОБРСТО))
- Krumovo Airfield (Plovdiv IAP)
  - 44th Helicopter Air Regiment (44ти Вертолетен Авиационен Полк (44ти ВАП))
    - 1/44th Helicopter Air Squadron, flying Mil Mi-8T
    - 2/44th Helicopter Air Squadron, flying Mi-17
    - 3/44th Helicopter (Training) Air Squadron, flying Mi-2
  - ? Independent Aviation Technical Battalion (? Отделен Авио-технически Батальон (? ОАТБ))
  - 44th Independent Battalion for Signals and Radio- and Lighting Technical Support (44ти Отделен Батальон за Свръзки и Радиосветотехническо Осигуряване (44ти ОБРСТО))
- Troops Aviation Repair Workshop Graf Ignatievo (Войскова Авиационна Ремонтна Работилница - Граф Игнатиево (ВАРР))
- Troops Aviation Repair Workshop Bezmer (Войскова Авиационна Ремонтна Работилница - Безмер (ВАРР))
- Troops Aviation Missile Repair Workshop (Войскова Авиационна Ремонтна Работилница за Ракети (ВАРРР)) (Graf Ignatievo)
- 10th Signals Regiment (10ти Свързочен Полк), in Plovdiv
- 10th Radio-Technical Battalion, in Plovdiv (supporting the flight activities of the corps' air regiments, with radar posts located at the airfields)
