= Cheshnegirovo Air Base =

Airbase in Bulgaria

- Авиобаза Чешнегирово
- Cheshnegirovo, Bulgaria

Site information
- Type: Former Military Air Base
- Operator: Bulgarian Air Force
- Controlled by: Bulgarian Air Force

Location
- Location within Bulgaria
- Coordinates: 42°6′50″N 24°59′29″E

Site history
- In use: 1951 – 2002

Airfield information
- Identifiers: ICAO: LBPS
- Elevation: 184 metres (604 ft) AMSL
Runways
Direction	Length and surface
10/28	2,544 metres (8,346 ft) Concrete

Cheshnegirovo Air Base/Sadovo (ICAO code: LBPS) used to house the 25th Fighter-Bomber Air Regiment (flying MiG-23BN/UBs) of the 10th Composite Aviation Corps. Located in central Bulgaria, north east of Plovdiv. According to the major restructuring plans it became the first regiment to convert to an air base structure. Briefly it housed the entire Bulgarian MiG-23 fleet after which it became inactive.

== History ==
Alternate name Sadovo. Also spelled 'Tcheshnigirovo'. Date when built - 1951. Home of 25 Fighter-Bomber Air Regiment of 10th Composite Air Corps, with the Mikoyan-Gurevich MiG-17 "Fresco". In 1976 it received the MiG-23BN. The base closed in 2000 and is now used for the storage of aircraft. There are reports that the 68 Special Forces Brigade will move here from Plovdiv.

Runway data: Location: N42 06 50.91 E024 59 34.59, Elev: 604 ft (184 m), Rwy 10/28, Size: 8345 x 170 ft (2544 x 52 m), concrete.

== Aircraft ==
External image
- Cheshnegirovo Air Base after close

MiG-23BN Flogger in Cheshnegirovo Air Base
Serial	c/no. Prev. Identity	Delivered	Fate/Notes
06	7942/0393215766	1981	Preserved Rakovski Apr 2003
20	6542/0393209520	1978	Chopped in Cheshnegirovo Apr 2007
21	6543/0393209521	1978	Chopped in Cheshnegirovo Apr 2007
23	6545/0393209523	1978	Chopped in Cheshnegirovo Apr 2007
30	6546/0393209530	1978	Chopped in Cheshnegirovo Apr 2007
31	6547/0393209531	1978	Chopped in Cheshnegirovo Apr 2007
36	6548/0393209536	1978	Chopped in Cheshnegirovo Apr 2007
37	6549/0393209537	1978	Chopped in Cheshnegirovo Apr 2007
39	6641/0393209539	1978	w/o 7 August 1984
48	7843/0393215748	1981	Chopped in Cheshnegirovo Apr 2007
49	7844/0393215749	1981	w/o 3 August 1994
50	7845/0393215750	1981	Preserved Plovdiv/Krumovo Oct 2004
51	5650/0393208751	1976	Chopped in Cheshnegirovo Apr 2007
52	7846/0393215752	1981	w/o 16 Sept 1986
53	7847/0393215753	1981	Chopped in Cheshnegirovo Apr 2007
54	7848/0393215754	1981	Chopped in Cheshnegirovo Apr 2007
55	6344/0393209355	1977	Chopped in Cheshnegirovo Apr 2007
56	6345/0393209356	1977	Chopped in Cheshnegirovo Apr 2007
57	6346/0393209357	1977	Chopped in Cheshnegirovo Apr 2007
58	6347/0393209358	1977	Chopped in Cheshnegirovo Apr 2007
60	7849/0393215760	1981	Stored Graf Ignatievo May 2004
61	7850/0393215761	1981	Stored Graf Ignatievo May 2004
63	7941/0393215763	1981	Chopped in Cheshnegirovo Apr 2007
65	6348/0393209365	1977	Chopped in Cheshnegirovo Apr 2007
66	6349/0393209366	1977	Preserved Cheshnegirovo Town Apr 2003
67	6350/0393209367	1977	Chopped in Cheshnegirovo Apr 2007
70	5644/0393208370	1976	Chopped in Cheshnegirovo Apr 2007
75	5645/0393208375	1976	Stored Dobrich Sept 2002
77	7943/0393215777	1981	Chopped in Cheshnegirovo Apr 2007
79	5646/0393208379	1976	Preserved Plovdiv/Krumovo Oct 2004
80	7944/0393215780	1981	Chopped in Cheshnegirovo Apr 2007
90	5649/0393208400	1976	Dolna Mitropoliya
91	5647/0393208391	1976	Chopped in Cheshnegirovo Apr 2007
93		1976	w/o 19.08.1986 г.

References:

- European Air Forces Directory 2003/04 (Mach III)
- European Air Forces Directory 2005/06 (Mach III)

=== Mikoyan-Gurevich MiG-23UB Flogger ===
MiG-23UB Flogger
Serial	c/no. Prev. Identity	Delivered
020	A1037620	1976
021	A1037621	1976
022	A1037622	1976
023	A1037701	1977
024	A1037702	1977
25	A1037855	1978
26	A1037856	1978
27	A1037857	1978
028	A1038105	1981
29	A1038318	1983
30	A1038320	1983
31	A1038330	1983
32	A1038404	1984
33	A1038406	1984
040	19015140	1984

References:

- European Air Forces Directory 2003/04 (Mach III)
- European Air Forces Directory 2005/06 (Mach III)
- arrow-aviation.nl

== See also ==
- Dobroslavtsi Air Base
- Gabrovnitsa Air Base
- Uzundzhovo Air Base
- Graf Ignatievo Air Base
- Bezmer Air Base
- Dobrich Air Base
- Ravnets Air Base
- Balchik Air Base
- Vrazhdebna Air Base
- List of Bulgarian Air Force bases
- List of Bulgarian military bases
- 28th Air Detachment
- Military of Bulgaria
- The Bulgarian Cosmonauts
- List of joint US-Bulgarian military bases

== Bibliography ==
- Air Base History
- Air Group 2000
