= LBIA =

LBIA may refer to:

- Leeds Bradford International Airport, in England
- Bezmer Air Base, in Bulgaria, ICAO code LBIA
