= Chayka Naval Air Base =

Bulgarian Navy base

- Морска авиобаза Чайка
- Varna, Bulgaria
- Emblem of the Chayka Naval Air Base

Site information
- Type: Naval Air Base
- Operator: Bulgarian Navy
- Controlled by: Bulgarian Navy

Location
- Location within Bulgaria
- Coordinates: 43°11′12″N 27°50′54″E

Site history
- Built: 1915

Airfield information
- Elevation: 2 metres (6.6 ft) AMSL
Runways
Direction	Length and surface
n/a	n/a Concrete

Chayka Naval Air Base (Bulgarian: Морска авиобаза "Чайка") is a Bulgarian Navy base. It may be spelled 'Tchaika' and is sometimes known as Varna-Chaika. Chaika means seagull in Bulgarian. It is located on the southern edge of a river estuary south of the city of Varna on the Black Sea coast.

== History ==
A seaplane base at Peinerdzhika (or Peynerdjik) was established by the Imperial German Navy Air Service and opened in early spring 1916 during World War I. It was handed over to the Bulgarian Navy in April 1918 and became its main air base. On 5 April 1941 it became the base for Luftwaffe floatplanes of 7 Seenotdienststaffel. It is home to the Naval Aviation's helicopter unit.

On 9 June 2017, during a training mission of artillery fire against surface targets as a part of the Bulgarian Navy's "Black Sea-2017" exercises, a Panther helicopter crashed in the water, killing the commander and injuring the other two officers on board. The helicopter's main rotor made contact with the fore flagpole of the frigate BGS-41 Drazki, sending it into the sea. After the flagpole strike commander Captain Georgi Anastasov turned back to the frigate to attempt an emergency landing in the water nearby. According to Navy officials his actions directly contributed to the saving of the other two officers on board with only minor injuries. His efforts led to his posthumous promotion to Major.

== Naval aviation ==
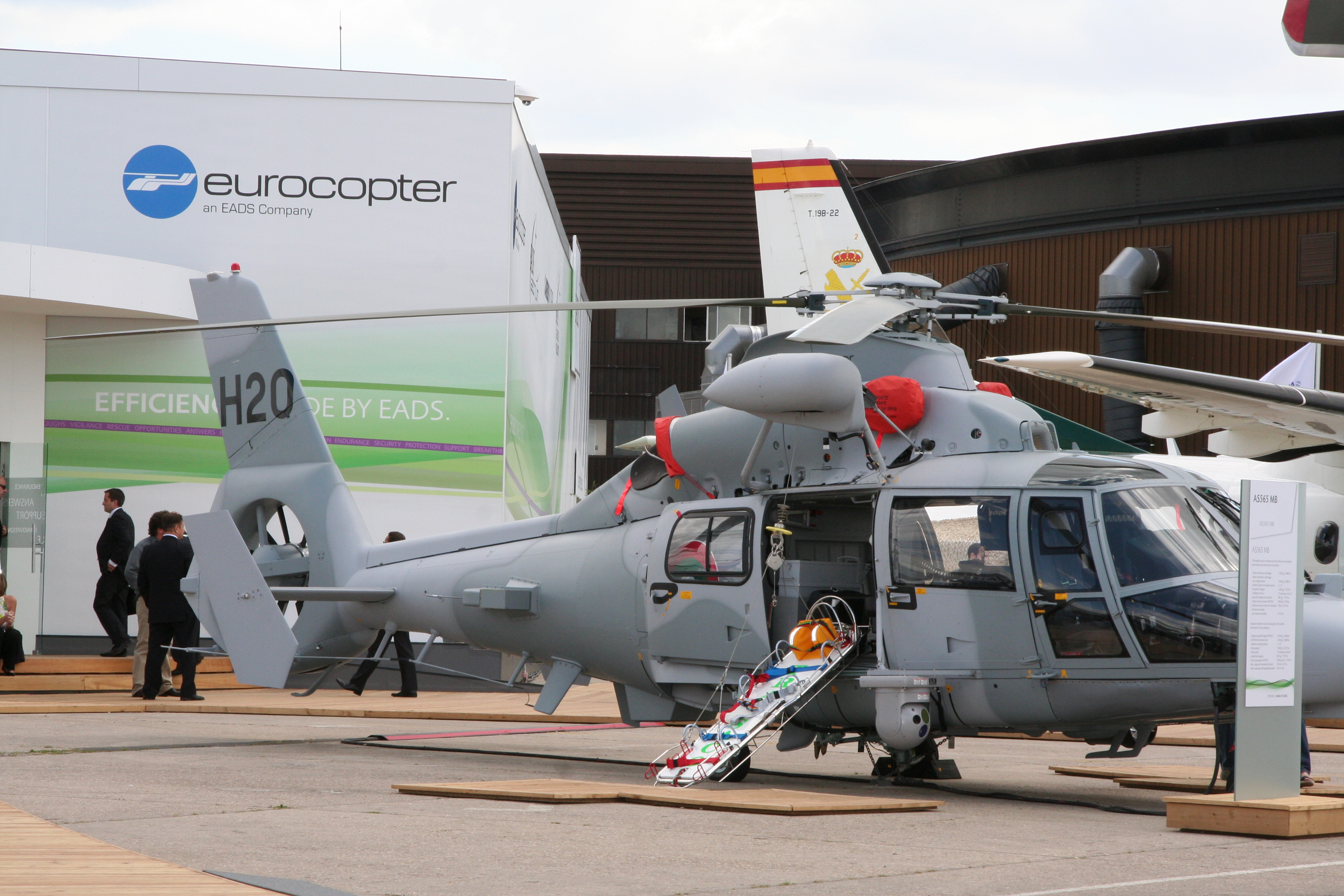
Bulgarian Eurocopter AS565 Panther in Paris Air Show

The base hosts two Eurocopter AS565 Panther and one Eurocopter AS365 Dauphin helicopters. Three Mil Mi-14 which are not in flyworthy condition are held in storage at the base.

== See also ==
- List of Bulgarian Air Force bases
- List of Bulgarian military bases
- 28th Air Detachment
- Bulgaria
- Military of Bulgaria
- The Bulgarian Cosmonauts
- List of joint US-Bulgarian military bases
