= Dobroslavtsi Air Base =

Air force facility in Bulgaria

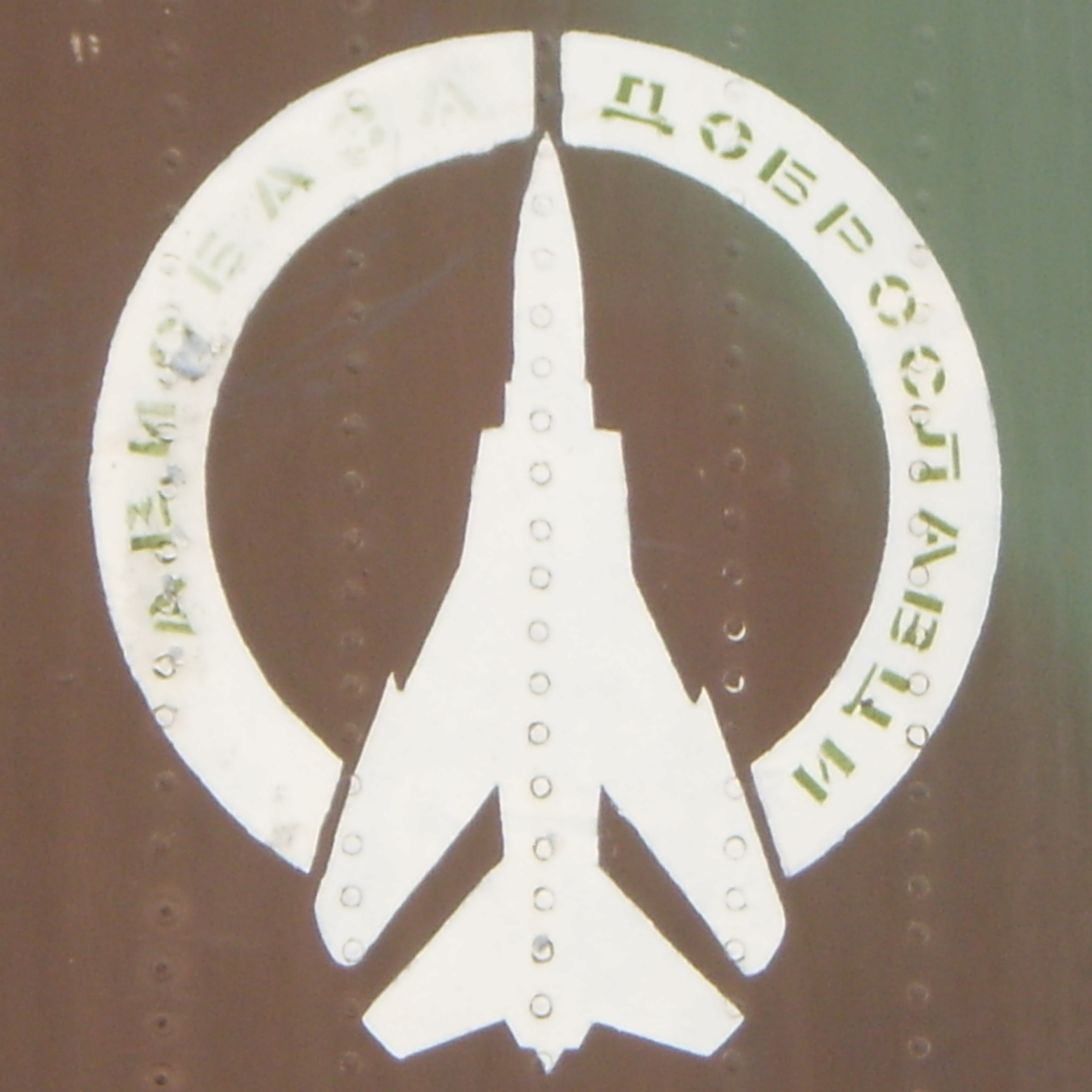
Dobroslavtsi Air Base
- Авиобаза Доброславци
- Dobroslavtsi, Bulgaria
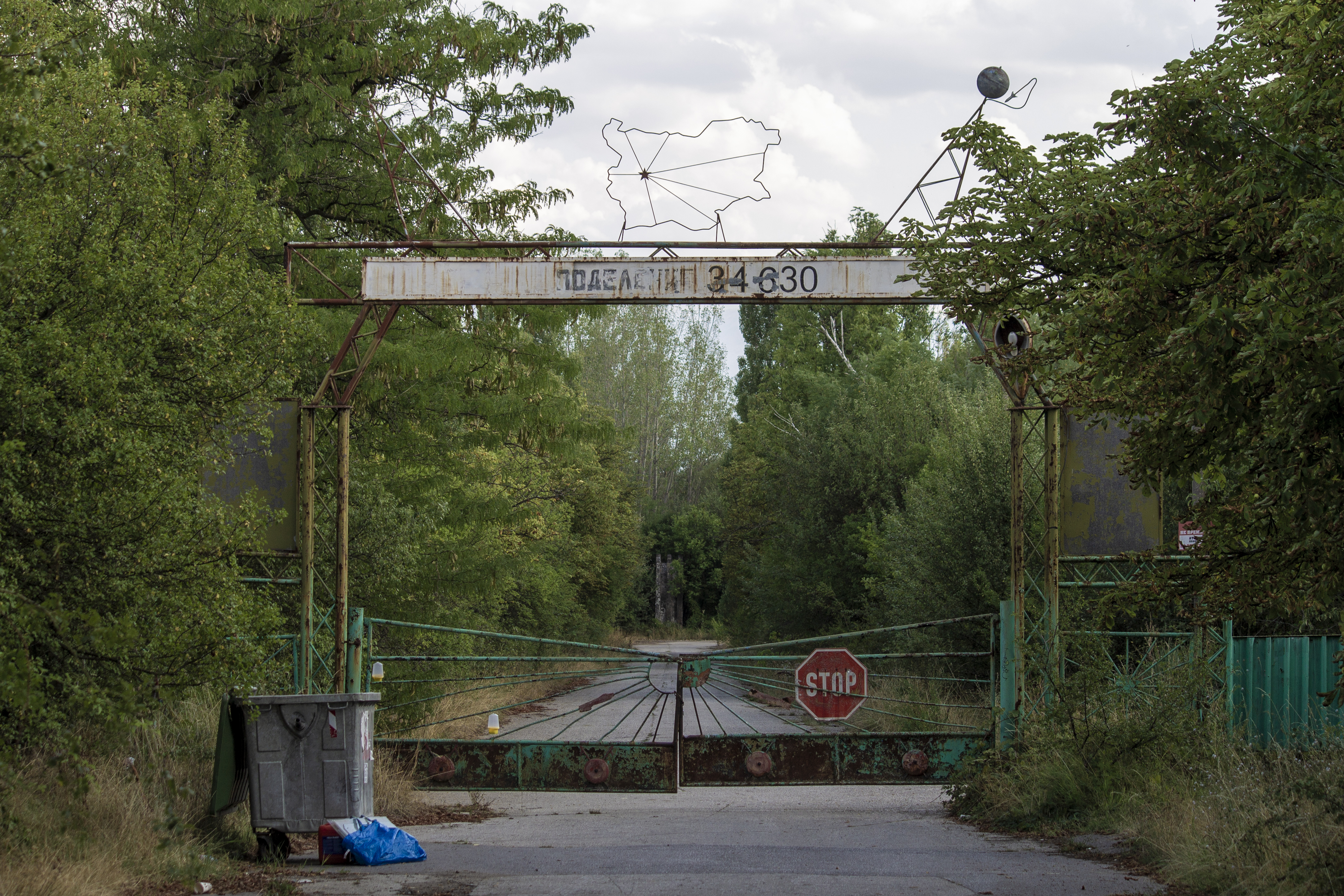
- Entrance to the Air Base

Site information
- Type: Former Military Air Base
- Operator: Bulgarian Air Force
- Controlled by: Bulgarian Air Force

Location
- Location within Bulgaria
- Coordinates: 42°48′44″N 023°17′58″E

Site history
- In use: 1950–2003

Airfield information
- Identifiers: ICAO: LBSD
- Elevation: 530 metres (1,740 ft) AMSL
Runways
Direction	Length and surface
09/27	2,202 metres (7,224 ft) Concrete

Dobroslavtsi Air Base or 1st Fighter Air Base Dobroslavtsi (Bulgarian: 1ва Изтребителна авиобаза Доброславци) is an air force facility near Sofia, the capital of Bulgaria. It is located to the west of the city and has for long time been its major air defence asset. Currently the base is disbanded with the only activity being guarding duty of the airframes of MiG-23s, conserved at the field.

== Establishment ==
The military airbase was opened for operations on 20 April 1952 as part of the huge modernization program of the air force, intended to transit the inventory in the jet age. The 18th and 43rd Fighter Air Regiments of the 4th Fighter Air Division were transferred to the base, formed two years earlier at Vrazhdebna Airfield. The aircraft type operated by the two regiments by the time of the re-basing was the Yak-9M/P fighter and a small quantity of Yak-11 fighter-trainers. Shortly afterwards a major boost in the units' operational capabilities has been achieved with the introduction of the Yak-23s and Yak-17U - Bulgaria's first jet fighter type - into operations on 17 May 1952. Still a minor group of Yak-9s remained on quick reaction duty until 1954.

The year 1955 saw the 18th Fighter Air Regiment converting to the MiG-15 and four years later - to the MiG-17F. The 43rd Fighter Air Regiment flew the MiG-15 from 1956 until its disbandment in 1960.

== The Supersonic Years ==
The 1st Squadron of the 18th FAR transitioned to the supersonic MiG-19S/P in 1963. The following year saw a group of the regiment's flight officers being dispatched to the USSR for an operational conversion course to the advanced MiG-21 fighter. Upon arming with the MiG-21PF aircraft (12 units) the 2nd Squadron was transferred to the Gabrovnitsa Airfield in the country's northwestern area. After an upgrade in 1969, the regiment's MiG-19P were brought to a standard, which allowed them to carry two K-13 Air-to-Air missiles with IR-homing.

In 1975 the 1st Squadron (in Dobroslavtsi) transitioned to the outstanding for its time MiG-21MF fighter and declared operational readiness the following year. At the time these events occurred the squadron leader was Georgi Ivanov Kakalov, the country's first cosmonaut. The major re-armament program of the Bulgarian Air Force, started in the 1970s saw the squadron once again converting to a superb fighter type, when a group of pilots and ground engineers went to the Soviet Union (The Operational Conversion Center at Lugovoye, Kyrgyz SSR) for a conversion course to the MiG-23MF in 1978. On 10 October the first of 12 MiG-23MFs and 3 MiG-23UMs arrived at Dobroslavtsi AB. The aircraft's ability to intercept enemy machines unspotted, using its IR sensors and the armament of R-23R/T BVR Air-to-Air missiles in addition to the new R-60 short-range Air-to-Air missiles made the BAF the best air arm in southeastern Europe. The live firings at the Astrakhan Range, USSR, made shortly after achieving operational readiness and being graded "excellent" have shown that the Bulgarian pilots have been trained to the fullest of the aircraft's capabilities. During the Warsaw Pact's major scale maneuvers in the 1980s the Bulgarian MiG-23s were even able to intercept Soviet MiG-25 recon planes, entering Bulgarian airspace from Romania and flying at speeds of Mach=2.5+ and altitudes of 20000+ meters.

In 1982 the 18th Fighter Air Regiment's 3rd Squadron was disbanded. This unit has for long time been the air defence force's operational training unit for fighter pilots. The tactics needed for air defence tasks were obtained by the newly formed pilots and a required number of flight hours was achieved by them before transferring to a front-line squadron of the 1st or 2nd Air Defence Divisions. The same year 8 MiG-23MLAs were received by the 1st Squadron, this new variant being able to fire R-24 advanced BVR-missiles. At the end of 1991 the last MiG-23s being acquired by Bulgaria were delivered to Dobroslavtsi. Those were second-hand MLDs of the specially developed sub-variant for countering the F-15s and F-16s. The five units saw action in Afghanistan and came from the 168th Fighter Air Regiment of the Soviet Airforce at Starokonstantinov, modern Ukraine. That was part of a deal, struck with Moscow for the 3 remaining Bulgarian MiG-25s.

== Years of Decline ==
The economical difficulties of the country led to a rapid decline of flight activity and operational readiness in the 1990s. In 1994 the 18th FAR was disbanded and the 1st Air Defence Base was formed, comprising the 1st Fighter Air Squadron, being named "Knights of the Sky" and a number of ground units, supporting the squadron's flight operations. In 1998 the former regiment's airbase at Gabrovnitsa (being reformed as 2nd Air Defence Base and its squadron named "Wild Cat") ceased operations and its aircraft and personnel were transferred to Dobroslavtsi. So the 1st AD Base acquired its MiG-23MLDs and UBs. In accordance with " Reform Plan 2004" of the armed forces the base was disbanded in 2002.

== See also ==
- Cheshnegirovo Air Base
- Bulgarian Air Force
- Gabrovnitsa Air Base
- Ravnets Air Base
- Graf Ignatievo Air Base
- Bezmer Air Base
- Dobrich Air Base
- Vrazhdebna Air Base
- Balchik Air Base
- Uzundzhovo Air Base
- List of Bulgarian Air Force bases
- List of Bulgarian military bases
- 28th Air Detachment
- Bulgaria
- Military of Bulgaria
- Bulgarian cosmonaut program
