= List of Bulgarian Air Force bases =

The Bulgarian Air Force has used a number of air bases since 1945.

== 1st Fighter Air Base (Dobroslavtsi) ==
Dobroslavtsi Air Base used to house a fighter squadron (flying Mikoyan-Gurevich MiG-23) of the 18th Fighter Air Regiment - an integral part of the 1st Air Defence Division. Later, as 1st Fighter Air Base it was put under the newly established Air Defence Corps and its squadron was named "Knights of the Sky". Dobroslavtsi has been the main air defence asset of the capital Sofia right until its deactivation in 2002

== 2nd Fighter Air Base (Gabrovnitsa) ==
Gabrovnitsa Air Base, near the city of Montana, used to house a fighter squadron (flying MiG-23s) of the 18th Fighter Air Regiment - an integral part of the 1st Air Defence Division. Later, as 2nd Fighter Air Base it was put under the newly established Air Defence Corps and its squadron was named "Wild Cat". Gabrovnitsa Air Base was the main air defence asset of the Kozloduy Nuclear Power Plant at Kozloduy right until its deactivation.

== 3rd Fighter Air Base (Graf Ignatievo) ==
Graf Ignatievo Air Base used to house the 19th Fighter Air Regiment (flying MiG-21s) of the 10th Combined Air Corps. Later the corps was transformed into Tactical Air Command and the 19th FAR was transferred to Air Defence Corps as 3rd Fighter Air Base. Today it is the sole active Fighter Air Base of the BAF with two squadrons, one of which is the MiG-29 "Sharks" squadron of the deactivated 5th FAB - Ravnets.

== 4th Fighter Air Base (Uzundzhovo) ==
Uzundzhovo Air Base, near the city of Haskovo, used to house a fighter air regiment and after its disbandment became a squadron of the 19th Fighter Air Regiment (HQ at Graf Ignatievo). When the 19th FAR was transformed into 3rd FAB and shifted to ADC Uzundzhovo went along as an independent unit: the 4th Fighter Air Base. Shortly afterwards it changed tasks and hats transferring to the Tactical Air Command as 21st Fighter-Bomber Air Base and finally disbanded.

== 5th Fighter Air Base (Ravnets) ==
Ravnets Air Base, near the Black Sea coast city of Burgas, housed a squadron (flying MiG-21s, later MiG-29s) of the 17th Fighter Air Regiment - an integral part of the 2nd Air Defence Division. Later, as 5th Fighter Air Base it was put under the newly established Air Defence Corps and its squadron was named "Sharks"(although unofficially, but still because of its patch and its geographical location close to the sea this is how it used to be called). The base was considered elite because of its proximity to the Turkish border and its task to protect the oil refinery near Burgas, which is deemed of strategical importance to the country. That is the reason for the squadron to be the first (and only) transiting to the MiG-29. As the base deactivated the air unit was moved to Graf Ignatievo, where it is currently residing as 2nd Squadron of the 3rd Fighter Air Base.

== 6th Fighter Air Base (Balchik) ==
Balchik Air Base housed a squadron (flying MiG-21s) of the 17th Fighter Air Regiment - an integral part of the 2nd Air Defence Division. Later, as 6th Fighter Air Base it was put under the newly established Air Defence Corps. As the base de-activated its MiG-21bis/ UM fighters were transferred to the 26th Reconnaissance Air Base. Today the base is rarely used for para-training and sea survival courses. Currently 6th Aviation Material Preservation Base.

== 11th Training Air Base (Shtraklevo) ==
Shtraklevo Air Base housed between two and four training squadrons, flying Aero L-29s as 1st Training Air Regiment of the Higher Military Aviation School. Later the regiment was transformed into 11th Training Air Base and de-activated. Currently 11th Aviation Material Preservation Base.

== 12th Training Air Base (Kamenets) ==
Kamenets (now transferred to Dolna Mitropoliya) housed the 2nd Training Air Regiment of the Higher Military Aviation School, flying MiG-21s, L-29s and Aero L-39s. Later it was transformed into 12th Training Air Base and became part of Tactical Air Command. Today it has just been moved to its former location of Dolna Mitropolija and it flies a squadron of Pilatus PC-9Ms and a squadron of L-39s.

== 16th Transport Air Base (Vrazhdebna) ==
Vrazhdebna Air Base (military area of Sofia Airport) housed the 16th Transport Air Regiment, which transformed into 16th Transport Air Base (but popularly the base is still called "trap" - the acronym of the regiment). It houses the 1st Air Transport Squadron, flying Antonov An-26s, Let L-410s, and a sole Pilatus PC-12. The An-26s are flown to important assignments in support of Bulgarian units, contributing to missions in Bosnia and Herzegovina, Kosovo, Iraq and recently to Afghanistan. The squadron is to acquire the first of the ordered Alenia C-27J Spartans in a couple of months.

== 21st Fighter-Bomber Air Base (Uzundzhovo) ==
Uzundzhovo Air Base (formerly 4th FAB) used to house a fighter air regiment and after its disbandment became a squadron of the 19th Fighter Air Regiment (HQ at Graf Ignatievo). When the 19th FAR was transformed into 3rd FAB and shifted to ADC Uzundzhovo went along as an independent unit: the 4th Fighter Air Base. Shortly afterwards it changed tasks and hats transferring to the Tactical Air Command as 21st Fighter-Bomber Air Base and finally disbanded.

== 22nd Ground Attack Air Base (Bezmer) ==
Bezmer Air Base (becoming a joint Bulgarian-American training facility) housed the 22nd Ground Attack Air Regiment (flying Sukhoi Su-25s), which was part of the 10th Combined Air Corps. When the corps transformed into Tactical Air Command the 22nd Ground Attack Air Base transitioned to the new structure. After 26th RAB - Dobrich was de-activated its squadron, flying the dedicated recon planes - the Su-22M-4/UM-3K was transferred to Bezmer where it very briefly operated as an Air Reconnaissance Flight before it disbanded a little more than a year later. Today the 22nd GAAB has two squadrons: 1st Squadron (called "Rattlesnake" or as its patch says "Crotale") and 2nd Squadron (called unofficially "The Khans", because of the traditional Bulgarian insignias of its ancient rulers it has in its patch). The base took intensively part in every joint exercise at home and abroad, held until the time of its establishment.

== 23rd Attack Helicopters Air Base (Stara Zagora) ==
Stara Zagora Air Base used to house the 13th Attack Helicopters Air Regiment (flying 44 Mil Mi-24, of which 6 were of the "V" version and the remainder of the "D") of the 10th Combined Air Corps. As The corps transformed into Tactical Air Command, so did the regiment, becoming an air base. In the late 1990s it disbanded, sending one squadron to the 24th Helicopter Air Base and disestablishing the other one.

== 24th Helicopter Air Base (Krumovo) ==
Krumovo Air Base (military area of Plovdiv Airport) used to house the 44th Helicopter Air Regiment (flying Mil Mi-17s, Mil Mi-8s and Mil Mi-2s) of the 10th Combined Air Corps. According to the major restructuring plans, it became an air base and when 23rd AHAB disbanded, one of its squadrons became 2nd Attack Helicopter Squadron of the 24th HAB. The 1st Helicopter Squadron flies the Mi-17s and the 2nd Helicopter Squadron flies the 12 Eurocopter AS 532AL Cougars delivered from 2006 to 2009. The Bell 206B-3s that were acquired at the end of the 1990s form an Independent Helicopter Training Flight. 24th Helicopter Air Base is also the unit of the armed forces in constant readiness to react upon natural or industrial disasters, providing evacuation or providing emergency response units with air mobility. CSAR activities are also being developed. For that reason, a specialised unit is based at Krumovo, composed of PARA-SAR/CSAR operators, who are exclusively former servicemen of the 68th Special Forces Brigade, based nearby. Emphasis in their training is put on parachute jumps, alpine skills and MEDEVAC knowledge. A major boost in that kind of operations will occur when the last four AS.532AL arrive. Those will be dedicated CSAR machines, equipped with top-notch sensors and gear.

== 25th Fighter-Bomber Air Base (Cheshnegirovo) ==
Cheshnegirovo Air Base/Sadovo used to house the 25th Fighter-Bomber Air Regiment (flying MiG-23BN/UBs) of the 10th Combined Air Corps. According to the major restructuring plans it became the first regiment to convert to an air base structure. Briefly it housed the entire Bulgarian MiG-23 fleet after which it disbanded.

== 26th Reconnaissance Air Base (Dobrich) ==
Dobrich Air Base used to house the 26th Reconnaissance Air Regiment (flying MiG-21Rs/ PFM-Rs/ bis, Su-22M-4/ UM-3Ks and for some time the Mikoyan-Gurevich MiG-25R/U of the 10th Combined Air Corps. Later it became an air base with two squadrons. When Balchik AB de-activated its MiG-21bis/ UMs were transferred to the 26th RAB. After it also ceased operating, its Su-22s were sent to the 22nd GAAB at Bezmer.

== Bozhurishte Airfield ==
For a long time Bozhurishte Airfield has been the most important asset and a symbol of the Bulgarian aviation, housing military and civil flying activity, as well as aircraft production. A very inspiring sign stood over the entrance of the airfield during the 1920s and 1930s saying: "At that field we learn how to sacrifice ourselves for King and Motherland!" During the Second World War it has been the major Bulgarian Air Troops base and housed a number of air combat units in addition to the Air Troops Headquarters. At a time the greater number of air force units and aircraft were concentrated at Bozhurishte. After the introduction of jet combat aircraft the airfield became a major command and maintenance base for the missile air defence and early warning and control units of the country, the most important resident units being the 1st Missile Air Defence Brigade and the 1st Radio-Technical Brigade of the 1st AD Division. It is no longer a significant military facility and the future plans for it are not known. In sharp contrast with the legendary past of the airfield today it is a reason for a huge scandal, which is rapidly gaining momentum. According to a deal struck by the Ministry of Defence the airfield will most probably be destroyed to give space for a business center.

== Plovdiv ==
The city of Plovdiv used to house the headquarters of the Tactical Aviation Command and is still a place of significance as it houses a number of logistical and operational support units of the Bulgarian Air Force. The 2nd Missile Air Defence Brigade is also based in the vicinities of the city and is responsible for the air defence of the central part of the country.

== Burgas ==
The city of Burgas is the place around which the 3rd Missile Air Defence Brigade of the Bulgarian Air Force is deployed, providing counter air protection of the country's eastern area, the navy and the Bourgas Oil Refinery.

== 63rd Independent Maritime Helicopter Air Base at Varna (Chaika) ==
The Chayka Naval Air Base at Varna houses the Independent Maritime Helicopter Squadron - the Bulgarian Fleet Air Arm. Currently it flies Mil Mi-14s and is awaiting AS.565MBs which are on order.

== See also ==
- List of joint US-Bulgarian military bases
