= Graf Ignatievo Air Base =

Air base in Graf Ignatievo, Bulgaria

- Авиобаза Граф Игнатиево
- Graf Ignatievo / Plovdiv, Bulgaria
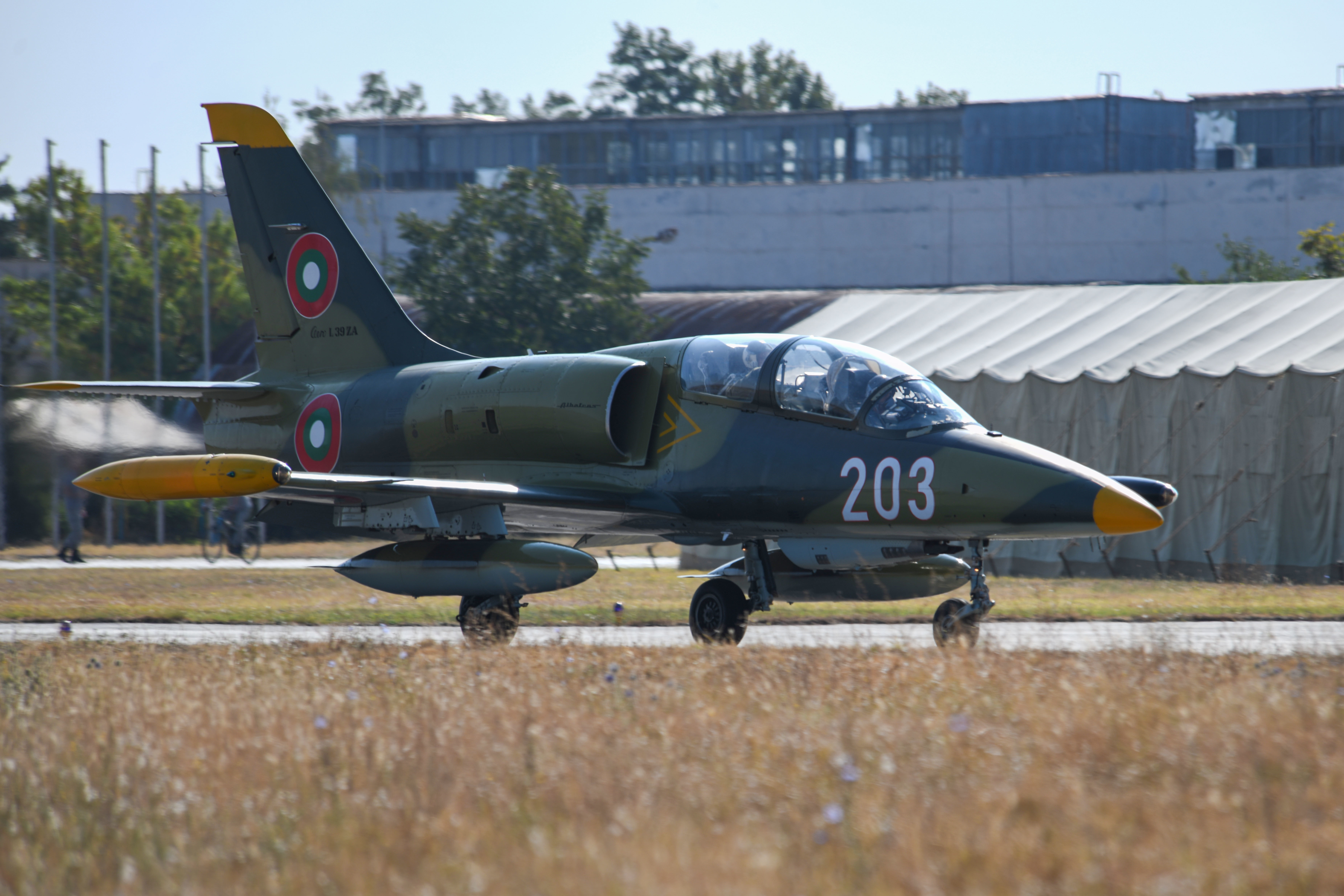
- Bulgarian Air Force Aero L-39ZA at Graf Ignatievo Air Base

- Emblem of Graf Ignatievo Air Base

Site information
- Type: Military Air Base
- Operator: Bulgarian Air Force
- Controlled by: Bulgarian Air Force

Location
- Location within Bulgaria
- Coordinates: 42°17′25″N 024°42′50″E

Site history
- In use: Since 18 March 1951

Airfield information
- Identifiers: ICAO: LBPG
- Elevation: 58 metres (190 ft) AMSL
Runways
Direction	Length and surface
08/26	2,992 metres (9,816 ft) Asphalt

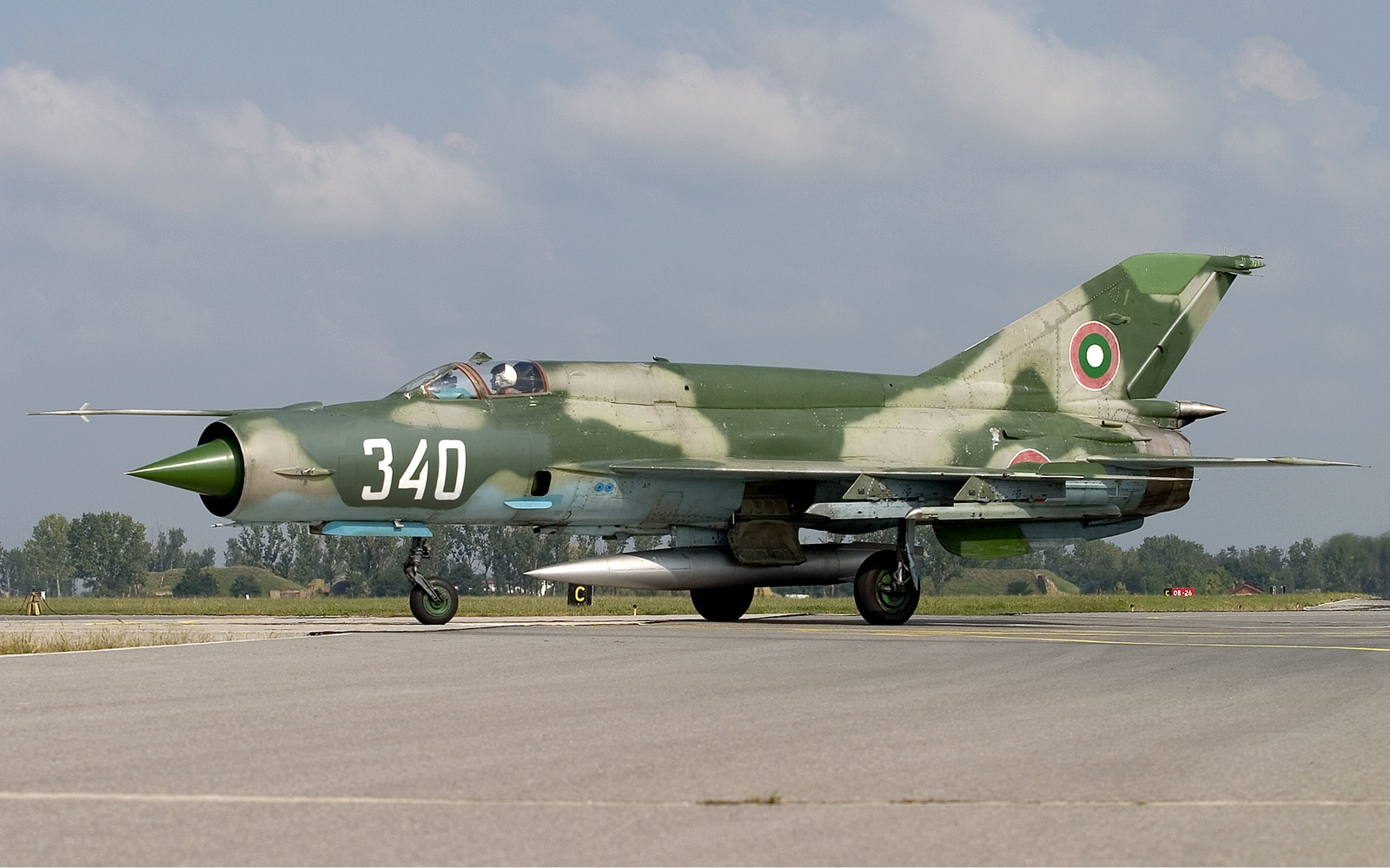
Bulgarian MiG-21

Second Squadron Mig 29

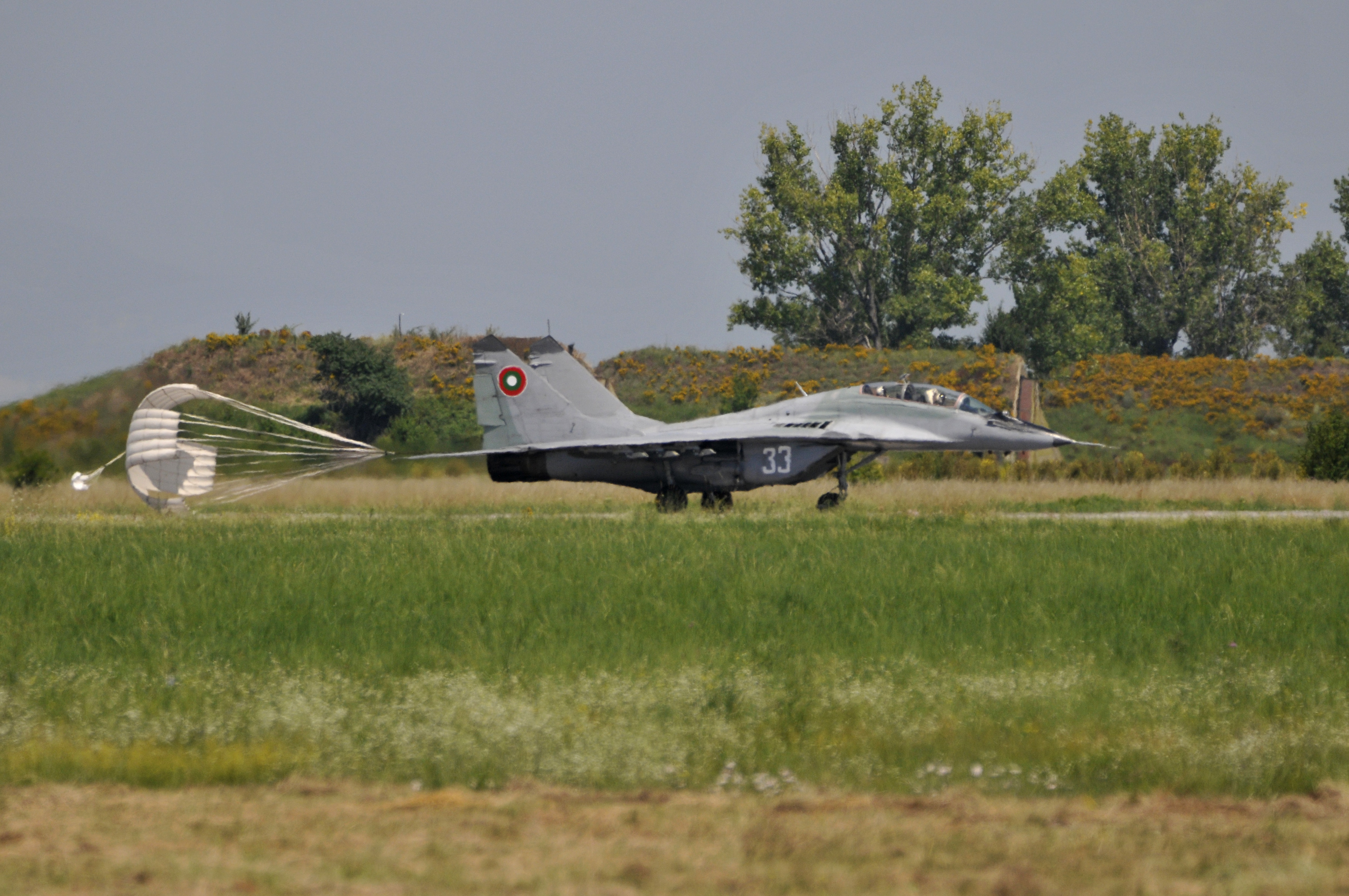
Bulgarian MIG-29

Graf Ignatievo Air Base (ICAO: LBPG) is located in the village of Graf Ignatievo, about 10 kilometres (6.2 mi) north of Plovdiv, Bulgaria's second largest city. It is the sole remaining fighter base of that state and houses two squadrons of jet aircraft.

== Early years ==
Graf Ignatievo is often called the German airfield by the Bulgarian aviation society, as the airfield was built with the extensive help of engineers from the Third Reich in the 1930s and was intended to house units of the Luftwaffe. In 1940, the airfield, when it became ready was turned over to the Bulgarian His Majesty's Air Troops. The first operational unit based here was the 2nd Army Aviation Regiment, comprising four yatos (squadrons):

- Fighter yato, flying the Avia B.534 Dogan, Czechoslovak biplane fighters
- Level bomber yato, flying the PZL.43 Chaika Polish light bombers
- Reconnaissance yato, flying the Letov S.328 (Vrana) reconnaissance aircraft
- Training yato, flying various training machines

In 1943 the regiment was redesignated a ground attack regiment and in August the first of 12 Junkers Ju 87 R-2 dive bombers were delivered, followed from January to May 1944 by the more advanced Ju 87 D-5 (32 units), to form the regiment's 1st Orlyak. The 2nd Orlyak retained the B.534 fighters (21 units) with a secondary ground attack role. The formation relocated to Vrazhdebna airfield to take part in the war against the Third Reich.

== The Jet Age ==
In 1945, the regiment converted to the Soviet Ilyushin Il-2/M3 and, in line with the Soviet air force organisational charts, transformed into a ground attack air division. For a short period, the 26th Independent Reconnaissance Air Regiment, flying the Petlyakov Pe-2, was also based at Graf Ignatievo airfield. In the beginning of 1951, the 15th, 19th and 21st fighter air regiments (FAR) were relocated to the airfield from Karlovo to form the 10th Fighter Air Division. Those were the descendants of the orlyaks of the former 6th Fighter Regiment of the His Majesty's Air Troops - their sole fighter formation, which took part in the defence of the capital of Sofia from Allied bombing in 1943 and 1944. At the time of the relocation to Graf Ignatievo, the regiments flew only a handful of Yakovlev Yak-11 and Polikarpov Po-2 training aircraft in preparation for the transition to jet aircraft - the Yak-23 and Yak-17. The first fighters started flying in April 1951. The batch comprised only 30 Yak-23s and 4 Yak-17Us, as the Bulgarian Air Force started acquiring the MiG-15 in September the same year. For that reason, the Yaks were transferred to the newly forming 1st Fighter Air Division in Tolbukhin (today Dobrich, northwestern Bulgaria). Lieutenant-Colonel Simeon Simeonov (a legendary figure in Bulgarian aviation history and future Commander of the Bulgarian Air Force) assumed command of 10th FAD. His monument is located in the front of 3rd Fighter Air Base - Graf Ignatievo's control tower.

In April 1952, the 15th FAR relocated to Bezmer airfield, followed by the 21st FAR, moving to Uzundzhovo airfield. In May 1955, the 1st Squadron of the 19th FAR started flying the newly acquired MiG-17PF (12 units) with a radar targeting system. Those were the fighters involved in shooting down American spy balloons, deployed in great numbers over the country, downing seven of them.

In the summer of 1957, a group of pilots, headed by squadron leader Captain Razsolkov, took an operational conversion course on the MiG-19. A batch of 40 MiG-19S arrived at Graf Ignatievo in September, re-equipping 2/19th FAR, 3/19th FAR and a squadron of 21st FAR at Uzundzhovo. In May 1959, an additional 12 MiG-19P relieved the MiG-17PFs of the 1/19th FAR, only to be exchanged for 12 MiG-19PMs a year later. In 1961, the 19th FAR became a unit of the newly formed 10th Composite Aviation Corps (after restructuring the 10th Fighter Air Division). In 1963, pilots of the 3/19th FAR underwent an operational conversion course on the MiG-21F-13 at the Soviet Air Force Operational Conversion Center in Krasnodar, and even during the course, the first batch of that new aircraft type was delivered in Graf Ignatievo. In 1969, the 2/19th FAR converted to the MiG-21M. In the 1970s, the air regiment comprised two squadrons, with the 1st Squadron flying MiG-19PM/S and 2nd Squadron flying the MiG-21M. The 3rd Squadron gave away its MiG-21F-13s to the units, based at Tolbukhin and Ravnets, upon its disbandment. 1978 saw the last MiG-19s being withdrawn from service and replaced by MiG-21MFs. The 2/19th FAR became nuclear strike-qualified, and a number of its pilots were specially trained for that task. In 1982, the air regiment took part in "Shield '82" - the year's major Warsaw Pact exercise, held in Bulgaria, as 18 MiG-21MFs were operationally deployed to Shtraklevo airfield and later to Bezmer airfield. In 1983, the unit converted to the MiG-21bis, acquiring 36 units, along with some twin-seaters.

== Modern days ==
In 1990, the 21st FAR, at Uzundzhovo airfield, disbanded with its personnel and second-hand MiG-21bis forming the 19th FAR's 3rd Squadron remaining at Uzundzhovo.

In 1994, the 19th FAR also disbanded to form the 3rd Fighter Air Base (with the former 1/19, 2/19 and the ground aviation support units) at Graf Ignatievo airfield and the 4th Fighter Air Base (with the former 3/19 and the ground aviation support units) at Uzundzhovo airfield. When the 10th Combined Air Corps was transformed into the Tactical Aviation Command, the 3rd FAB went under the newly formed Air Defence Corps. When the 5th Fighter Air Base at Ravnets airfield was disbanded, the 1/3.FAB and 2/19.FAB were merged in order for Graf Ignatievo to house the "Sharks" squadron as the new 2/3.FAB.

The 3rd Fighter Air Base is Bulgaria's sole remaining air defence fighter base, taking part in and housing virtually every national and multi-national exercise, involving Bulgarian MiG-29 & Su-25 fighter aircraft. Future plans concern the merging of the 3rd Fighter Air Base at Graf Ignatievo airfield and the 22nd Ground Attack Air Base at Bezmer airfield in one air base in order for the 22nd GAAB to give way to future American military facilities.

== See also ==
- http://www.grafportal.org/
- Bulgarian Air Force
- Bulgarian-American Joint Military Facilities
- List of Bulgarian Air Force bases
- Ravnets Air Base
- Balchik Air Base
- Bezmer Air Base
- Cheshnegirovo Air Base
- Dobroslavtsi Air Base
- Dobrich Air Base
- Gabrovnitsa Air Base
- Uzundzhovo Air Base
- List of Bulgarian military bases
- The Bulgarian Cosmonauts
- List of joint US-Bulgarian military bases
