= Ravnets Air Base =

Former Bulgarian Air Force base

- Авиобаза Равнец
- Ravnets, Bulgaria

Site information
- Type: Former Military Air Base
- Operator: Bulgarian Air Force
- Controlled by: Bulgarian Air Force

Location
- Location within Bulgaria
- Coordinates: 42°31′36.5″N 27°16′21.6″E

Site history
- In use: 1953 – 2001

Airfield information
- Identifiers: ICAO: LBBR
- Elevation: 23 metres (75 ft) AMSL
Runways
Direction	Length and surface
11/29	2,484 metres (8,150 ft) Asphalt
08/26	2,179 metres (7,149 ft) Asphalt
- Source: Landings.com

Ravnets Air Base (Bulgarian: Авиобаза Равнец) (ICAO: LBBR), also known as 5th Fighter Air Base, is a former Bulgarian Air Force base near Ravnets, Bulgaria, located on the Black Sea coast, 20 km west of Bourgas. Built in 1950, the base was home to the HQ and 1st Squadron of the 15th Fighter Air Regiment, 2nd Air Defence Division, flying the MiG-21 initially (but in 1989, the MiG-29). Starting in 1994, the base was called the 6th Fighter Air Base of the Tactical Air Corps. In 2000, Ravnets Air Base was closed and demolished.

== Short history ==
First Squadron Emblem

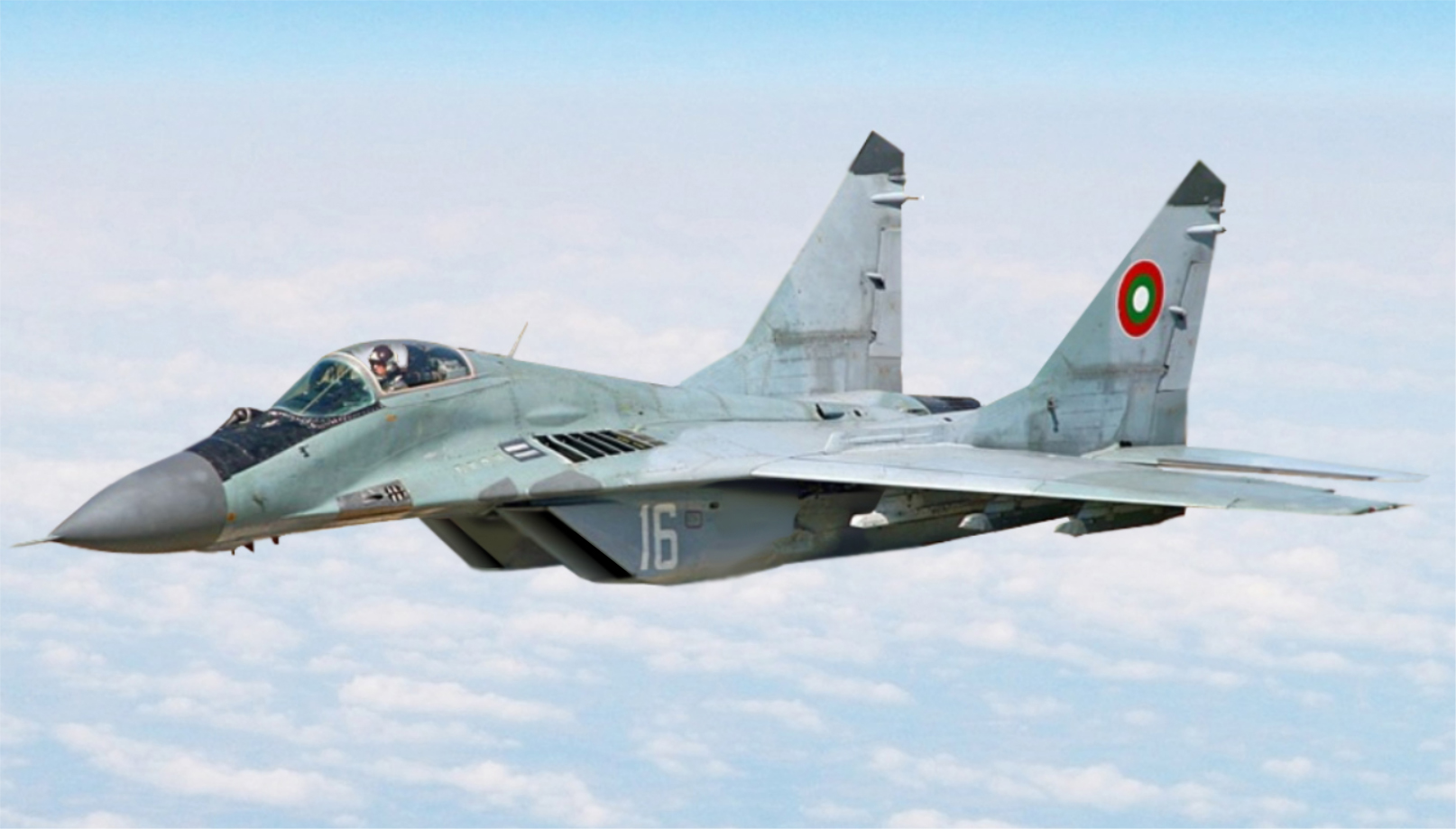
Bulgarian Air Force Mig-29

Ravnets Air Base housed a squadron (flying MiG-21s, later MiG-29s) of the 17th Fighter Air Regiment - an integral part of the 2nd Air Defence Division. Later, as 5th Fighter Air Base it was put under the newly established Air Defence Corps and its squadron was named "Sharks" (unofficially, because of its patch and its location close to the sea). The base was considered elite because of its proximity to the Turkish border and its task to protect the oil refinery near Burgas, which was deemed of strategic importance to the country. This importance is the reason why the squadron was the first (and only) to transition to the MiG-29. As the base was deactivated, the air unit was moved to Graf Ignatievo, where it is currently residing as the 2nd Squadron of the 3rd Fighter Air Base.

== History ==
On August 14, 1950, the 26th Flying Airpolk (successor to the US Army 2/6 Hogwarts Army Bombing Defense Force) was renamed to the 15th Colonel Aviation Regiment. At the time, the division was based on Bozhurishte Airport; a few months previously (in March), at Karlovo airport. 15th Avirpolk is the first step in the recovery of the reactive technology in Bulgaria in May 1950, namely, the Yak-23. In the second half of 1951 the regiment was rearmed with MiG-15. On April 14, 1952, the unit was transported to Bezmer Airport and four months later to the newly built Ravnets Airport. A little later, the regiment was provided with the MiG-17F. From May 1963 (after the disembarkation of the 27th Navy in Balchik), the 15th Yap became a double base - two squadrons at Ravnets Airport (one with MiG-17 and one with MiG-17PF from the disbanded 27th Japanese). one squadron (third) at Balchik Airport, MiG-17F. In 1967, the first 15th squadron was rearmed with 12 MiG-21FPM fighters. In 1970 the regiment again entered the two-tiered structure: the first squadron in Ravnets (MiG-21PFM) and the second in Balchik (MiG-17PF and MiG-17F). In 1978, a second squadron was rearmed with the MiG-21FMM (second hand donated by the USSR). For a year (from autumn 1983 to September 1984), the regiment was again in a three-layer structure: the third squadron was again set up with the idea of being disarmed with MiG-25PD interceptors, but soon this idea was abandoned, in the interest of Gabrovnitsa's rearmament with the MiG-23MDD.

In 1988, a first part of the ITS departments and departments undergo training in the USSR, and from summer of the following year, it became equipped with the Mikoyan MiG-29 fighter which ended in 1990.

In 1990, the 2nd Squadron was rearmed with the MiG-21bis (secondhand gifts from the USSR again). Since September 1, 1994, the 15th has been disbanded, and two air bases have been created at its base: 5 in Ravnets and 6 in Balchik. In 2000, the fifth aaab was converted to the 5th Air Base, which virtually ceased to exist. In 2001, flights were carried out - the transfer of several aircraft to Graf Ignatievo, although most of them were onshore.

== See also ==
- List of airports in Bulgaria
- List of Bulgarian Air Force bases
- Graf Ignatievo Air Base
- Cheshnegirovo Air Base
- Dobroslavtsi Air Base
- Bezmer Air Base
- Dobrich Air Base
- Gabrovnitsa Air Base
- List of joint US-Bulgarian military bases
