= Graf Ignatievo =

Coordinates: 42°16′51″N 24°44′40″E

Graf Ignatievo (Bulgarian: Граф Игнатиево, Turkish: Çulluk) is a village in Maritsa Municipality, southern Bulgaria. As of 2024 it has 1,852 inhabitants. The village is named after a Russian diplomat Count Nikolai Pavlovich Ignatiev, who played an important role as an ambassador of Russia in Istanbul for the conclusion of the Treaty of San Stefano that called for the creation of Greater Bulgaria. There is the major military Graf Ignatievo Air Base of great importance used by the Bulgarian Air Force and the US.
