= Dobrich Air Base =

Former Bulgarian military installation

- Авиобаза Добрич
- Dobrich, Bulgaria
- Emblem of the Dobrich Air Base

Site information
- Type: Former Military Air Base
- Operator: Bulgarian Air Force
- Controlled by: Bulgarian Air Force

Location
- Location within Bulgaria
- Coordinates: 43°36′34″N 027°50′11″E

Site history
- In use: 1951 – 2001

Airfield information
- Elevation: 251 metres (823 ft) AMSL
Runways
Direction	Length and surface
n/a	2,500 metres (8,200 ft) Concrete

26th Reconnaissance Air Base Dobrich (Bulgarian: 26та Разузнавателна авиобаза Добрич) is a former Bulgarian military installation near the City of Dobrich in the northeastern part of the country. It was of significant importance for the nation's security, as it housed the air force's sole air reconnaissance unit.

== The early years ==
On the 30 March 1951 a "Top Secret Order of Distinct Importance", issued by the Chief of the People's Armed Forces established the 26th Independent Air Reconnaissance Regiment, concentrating the three squadrons of Petlyakov Pe-2s at Graf Ignatievo Air Base airfield. In the period between May and September the same year the unit was redistributed to Krumovo airfield and subsequently from 2 Oct 1951 to the 23 September 1955 to Gorna Oryakhovitsa airfield. In September 1955 the regiment transferred for the last time to a new location, this one being the newly constructed airfield at Tolbukhin (as the city of Dobrich was called at that time).

The 26th IRAR converted to the aircraft, previously flown by the 30th Bomber Air Division, based at Balchik airfield, namely about 20 Tupolev Tu-2T torpedo bombers. In addition brand new Ilyushin Il-28 (between 10 and 12) jet bombers were delivered to be used in the reconnaissance role. As the flight hours of the latter depleted in 1959 they were withdrawn from service. In order to keep the operational skills of the flight crews 3 Ilyushin Il-14 transport planes were transferred to the regiment for training purposes. The reason for that was the delivery of a second batch of Il-28s in 1961, this one of dedicated reconnaissance planes of the R-variant. In the same year the Tu-2Ts were also withdrawn from use as the first of the MiG-15bisR entered operations. They were supplemented two years later by the MiG-17 and with their arrival a group of Algerian pilots was trained to that type of aircraft. In 1969 six MiG-21R entered service, along with some MiG-21F-13, being previously flown by the 2nd Squadron of the 19th Fighter Air Regiment (from Graf Ignatievo airfield). In 1972 more MiG-21F-13 came from the 1st Squadron of the 15th FAR (Ravnets airfield) were introduced as that unit converted to a more advanced variant of the MiG-21. The MiG-21R/ F-13 were concentrated in the 1st Squadron of the 26th IRAR, the 2nd Squadron operated the MiG-15bisR and MiG-17 and the 3rd Squadron - about 6 Il-28R. In 1974 the Ilyushins left the inventory and the MiG-15bisR - in 1981.

== A Major Leap ==
In November 1982 the advanced MiG-25RBT entered service with the Bulgarian Air Force to form the Operational Reconnaissance Flight for photographic reconnaissance and ELINT duties, and a secondary task of ground attack. For it up to 8 500 kg unguided bombs could be carried. But the most impressive ability was to carry nuclear bombs and upon the beginning of a major military conflict between NATO and the Warsaw Pact they were to be delivered from the Soviet Union for nuclear strikes against Greece and Turkey. A MiG-25RBT was lost in flight due to bad meteorological conditions and consequent lack of fuel in 1984. The remaining two units along with the sole dual-seater were transferred to the Soviet Union in 1991 in exchange for 5 MiG-23MLD transferred to the 1st Squadron of the 18th FAR in Dobroslavtsi Air Base.

In 1984 the regiment's 2nd Squadron converted to the Su-22M-4/UM-3K (the last units being delivered in 1988) for use as a tactical reconnaissance platform in photo reconnaissance and ELINT tasks. The last MiG-17 left the air force's inventory in 1989, At that time the 2/26th RAR was an elite air unit of the Warsaw Pact, comprising 22 pilots-1st class being superbly trained in airborne reconnaissance, guided weapons ground attack and even Air-to-Air combat, utilising the R-60 AAM, with about 120-130 flight hours yearly. Until the Treaty on Conventional Armed Forces in Europe forced the Bulgarian Air Force to remove that kind of specialised equipment nuclear strikes could also have been carried.

== The Final Years ==
The MiG-21F-13 were withdrawn from duty in exchange for some MiG-21MF from the disbanded 21st FAR Uzundzhovo Air Base (Uzundzhovo airfield), which the technical crews converted for re-con duties in a truly remarkable way. They used the UB-16 multiple launch rocket pods as a base for a new re-con pod with the addition of two AFA-39 airborne photographic cameras, that system being carried under the left side of the fuselage. In 1994 the 26th RAR became the 26th Reconnaissance Air Base with 1/26.RAB flying Su-22M-4/UM-3K and 2/26.RAB flying MiG-21MF/R/UM. A year later some L-39ZA were acquired in order to preserve the flight abilities of the pilots. The last remaining MiG-21R were withdrawn from service and because of that some more MiG-21MF were optimised to carry their dedicated re-con pods and so were denominated to MiG-21MF-R. In 1998 the 6th Fighter Air Base at Balchik airfield was disbanded and its aircraft and personnel formed the 3rd Squadron of the 26th RAB only for Dobrich Air Base also to be disbanded in 2002.

== See also ==
- Bulgarian Air Force
- List of Bulgarian Air Force bases
- List of Bulgarian military bases
- Bezmer Air Base
- Cheshnegirovo Air Base
- Graf Ignatievo Air Base
- Gabrovnitsa Air Base
- Dobroslavtsi Air Base
- Uzundzhovo Air Base
- Vrazhdebna Air Base
- 28th Air Detachment
- Bulgaria
- Military of Bulgaria
- Bulgarian cosmonaut program
- List of joint US-Bulgarian military bases
- List of airports in Bulgaria
