= Aytos Logistics Center =

Coordinates: 42°42′41″N 27°13′58″E

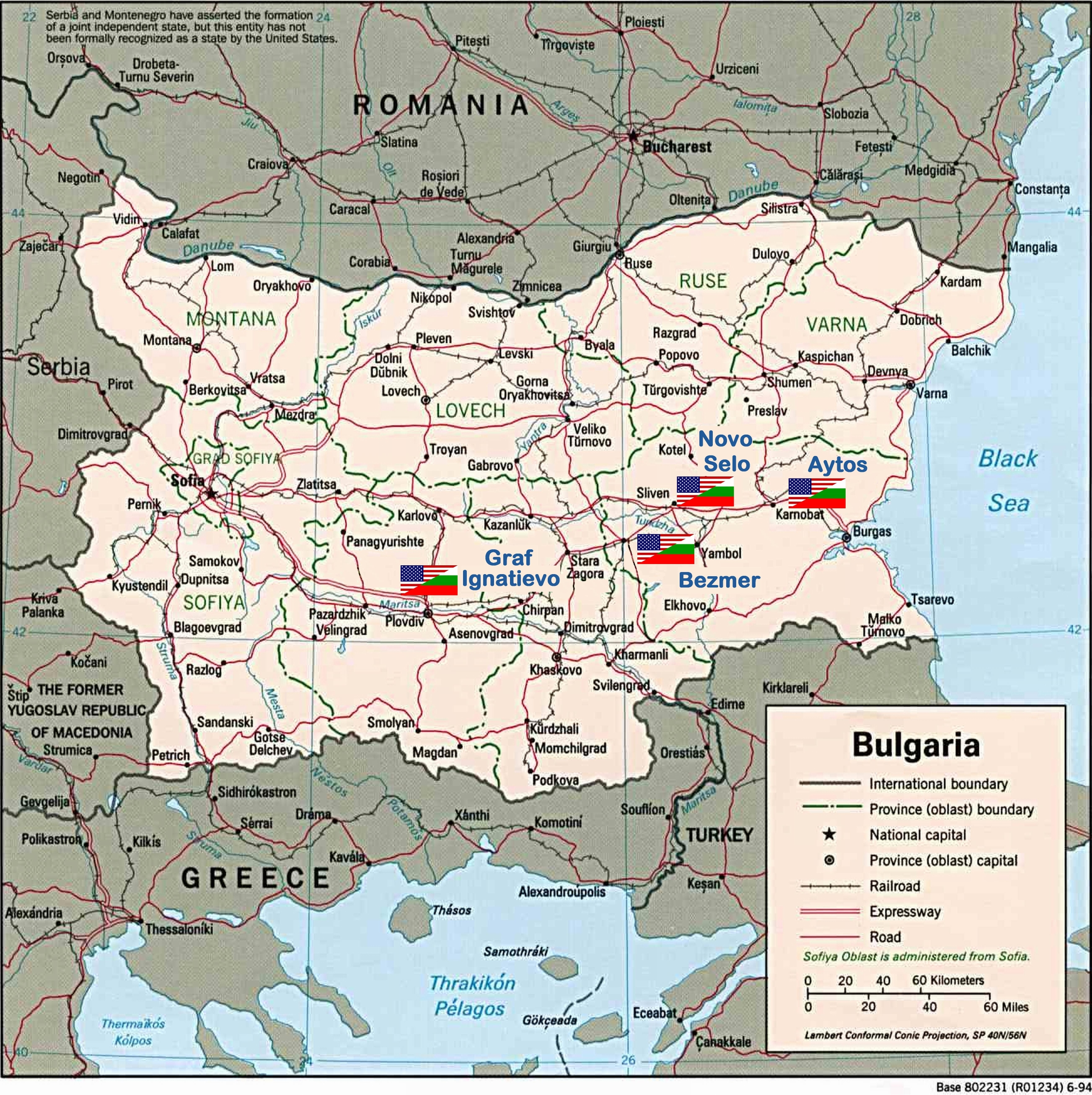
Joint US-Bulgarian military bases

The Aytos Logistics Center comprises military storage facilities located near the town of Aytos, designated for development in support of the Novo Selo Range.

The Aytos Logistics Center is among the joint US-Bulgarian military bases established according to the 2006 Defense Cooperation Agreement between the United States and Bulgaria.

== See also ==
- Bulgarian-American Joint Military Facilities
