= Bobrovka =

Bobrovka Бобровка
- Selo
- Location within Altai Krai Location within Russia
- Coordinates: 53°10′N 83°52′E
- Country: Russia
- Region: Altai Krai
- District: Pervomaysky District
- Time zone: UTC+7:00

Bobrovka (Russian: Бобровка) is a rural locality (a selo) and the administrative center of Bobrovsky Selsoviet, Pervomaysky District, Altai Krai, Russia. The population was 3,251 as of 2013. There are 60 streets.

== Geography ==
Bobrovka is located 33 km south of Novoaltaysk (the district's administrative centre) by road. Lesnoy and Rasskazikha are the nearest rural localities.
