= Czechoslovak Republic =

Coat of arms of Czechoslovak Republic

Czechoslovak Republic (Czech and Slovak: Československá republika, ČSR), was the official name of Czechoslovakia between 1918 and 1939 and between 1945 and 1960. See:

- First Czechoslovak Republic (1918–1938)
- Second Czechoslovak Republic (1938–1939)
- Czechoslovak government-in-exile (1939–1945)
- Third Czechoslovak Republic (1945–1948)
- Socialist Czechoslovakia (1948–1960)
