= Haskovo Malevo Airport =

Uzundzhovo Air Base
- Авиобаза Узунджово
- Haskovo, Bulgaria
- Emblem of Uzundzhovo Air Base

Site information
- Type: Former Military Air Base
- Operator: Bulgarian Air Force
- Controlled by: Bulgarian Air Force

Location
- Location within Bulgaria
- Coordinates: 41°58′34″N 025°35′23″E

Site history
- In use: 1951 – 2002

Airfield information
- Identifiers: ICAO: LBHS
- Elevation: 183 metres (600 ft) AMSL
Runways
Direction	Length and surface
11/29	2,204 metres (7,231 ft) Concrete

Uzundzhovo Air Base (or Haskovo Malevo Airport) used to house a fighter air regiment and after its disbandment became a squadron of the 19th Fighter Air Regiment (HQ at Graf Ignatievo). When the 19th FAR was transformed into 3rd FAB and shifted to ADC Uzundzhovo went along as an independent unit: the 4th Fighter Air Base. Shortly afterwards it changed tasks and hats transferring to the Tactical Air Command as 21st Fighter-Bomber Air Base and finally disbanded.

== 21st Fighter-Bomber Air Base (Uzundzhovo) ==
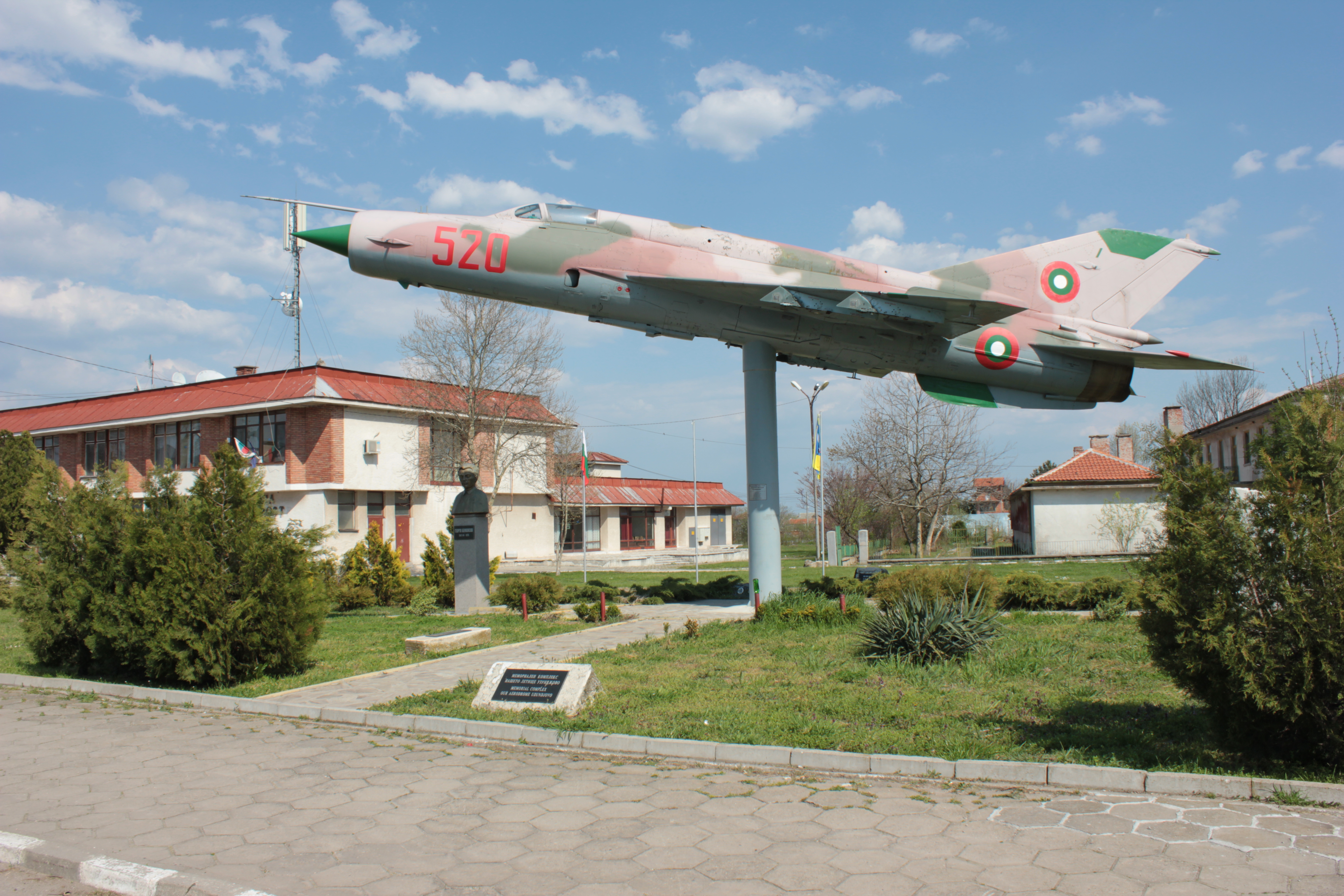
Former MiG-21 at the Uzundzhovo memorial complex.

Located in south east Bulgaria, near the city of Haskovo close to the border with Turkey. Postwar it was home to the 3rd Sqn of 19th FAR, then the 21st FAR, with the MiG-19 and MiG-21. In 1994 - 1996 it was home to the 4th Fighter Air Base of the Air Defence Corps. In 1996-1998 it was home to the 21st Fighter-Bomber Air Base of the Tactical Air Corps (exchanged for Graf Ignatievo). Closed in 1998 and demolished. Runway data: Location: N41 58 34.95 E025 35 23.34, Elev: 160 ft (49 m), Rwy 11/29, Size: 7230 x 180 ft (2204 x 55 m), concrete.

== See also ==
- List of Bulgarian Air Force bases
- Ravnets Air Base
- Balchik Air Base
- Bezmer Air Base
- Cheshnegirovo Air Base
- Dobroslavtsi Air Base
- Dobrich Air Base
- Gabrovnitsa Air Base
- The Bulgarian Cosmonauts
