= Bezmer Air Base =

Air base in Yambol, Bulgaria

- Авиобаза Безмер
- Yambol, Bulgaria
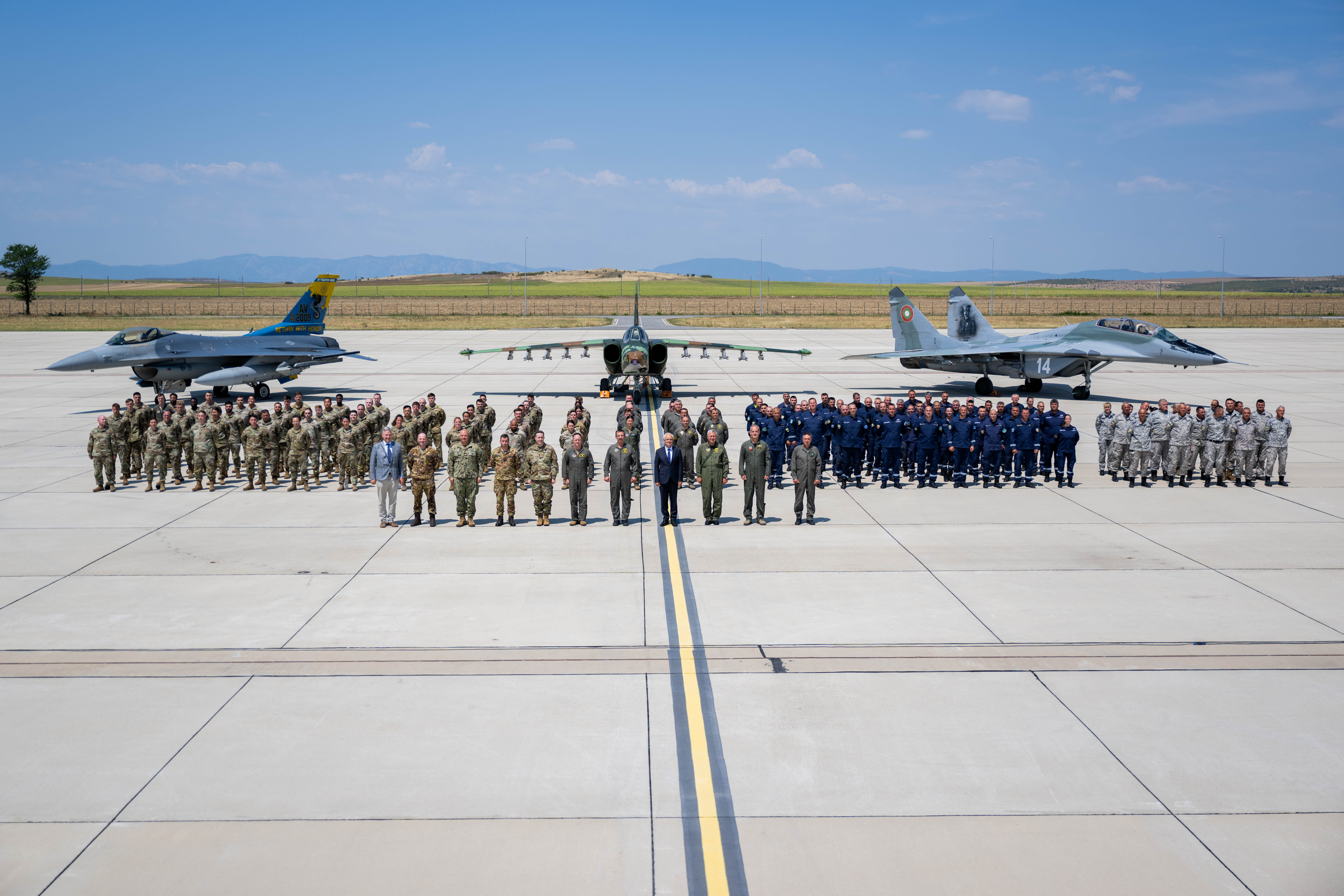
- American and Bulgarian leaders and airmen group photo at Bezmer during Thracian Viper 24

Site information
- Type: Military Air Base
- Operator: Bulgarian Air Force
- Controlled by: Bulgarian Air Force

Location
- Location within Bulgaria
- Coordinates: 42°27′17″N 026°21′08″E

Airfield information
- Identifiers: IATA: JAM, ICAO: LBIA
- Elevation: 155 metres (509 ft) AMSL
Runways
Direction	Length and surface
12/30	3,000 metres (9,800 ft) Concrete

Bezmer Air Base (IATA: JAM, ICAO: LBIA) is an air base for the Bulgarian Air Force. The base is situated in the eastern part of the Upper Thracian Lowland, in Yambol Oblast (Region), 10 km west of the city of Yambol and 30 km southeast of the city of Sliven, between the villages of Bezmer and Bolyarsko, and near the Sofia-Burgas railway. The base takes its name from the nearby village, which is named after Khan Bezmer of Bulgaria (7th Century AD).

== History ==
=== World War I ===
The strategic location and particularly favorable weather conditions of the area was appreciated already during World War I, when the Imperial German Air Service built in Yambol a base for zeppelins used for reconnaissance and bombing missions to Romania, Russia, Sudan and Malta.

=== Post World War II ===
In 1955 the Bezmer Air Base hosted the 22 Fighter Air Regiment, later transformed into 22 Fighter-Bomber Air Regiment, and eventually into 22 Attack Air Base of the Bulgarian Air Force, serving as a base for Su-25 ground attack aircraft, as well as Su-22М-4 and Su-22UM-3K reconnaissance planes.

First Squadron Emblem Su-25

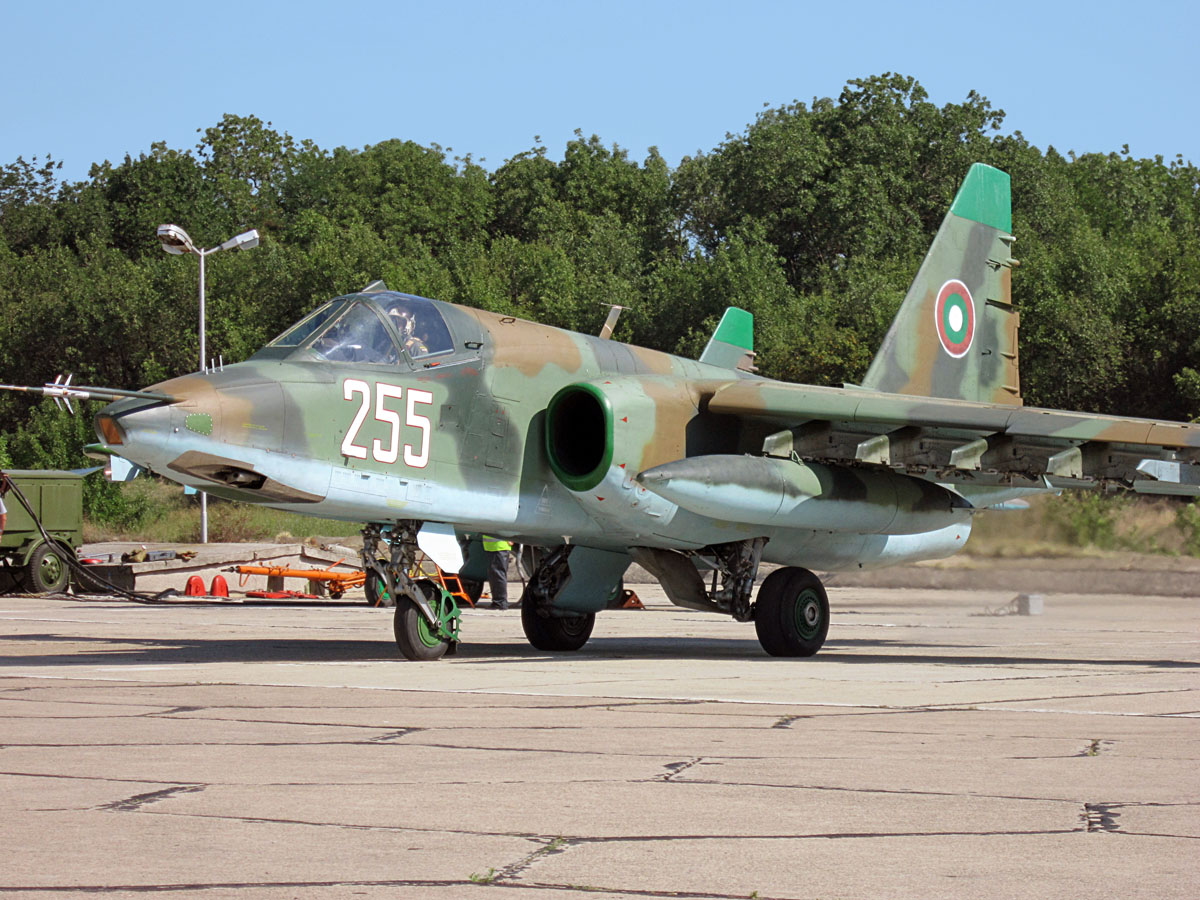
Bulgarian Air Force Su-25

=== Modern times ===
The Bezmer Air Base is situated in the eastern part of the Upper Thracian Lowland, in Yambol Oblast (Region), 20 km west of the city of Yambol and 30 km southeast of the city of Sliven, between the villages of Bezmer and Bolyarsko, and near the Sofia-Burgas railway. The base takes its name from the nearby village, which is named after Khan Bezmer of Bulgaria (7th Century AD).

== Current use ==
Aircraft and personnel from Bezmer have recently been participating in a number of joint military exercises including the PfP "Cooperative Key" in Turkey, Bulgaria, Romania and France, ‘Immediate Response 2005’ and the Bulgarian-American-Romanian "Immediate Response 2006".

The base has a modern communication, information and navigation system. A second phase of modernization and infrastructure development is underway, including a runway extension, which would expand the range of aircraft the base can support.

The Bezmer Air Base is among the joint US-Bulgarian military bases established according to the 2006 Defense Cooperation Agreement between the United States and Bulgaria. Some experts rank Bezmer among the six most important American military bases outside mainland USA.

United States Secretary of Defense Lloyd Austin visited the base on March 18, 2022.

The base was used to house United States Air Force KC-135 Stratotanker aircraft during the 2026 Iran war.

== Images ==
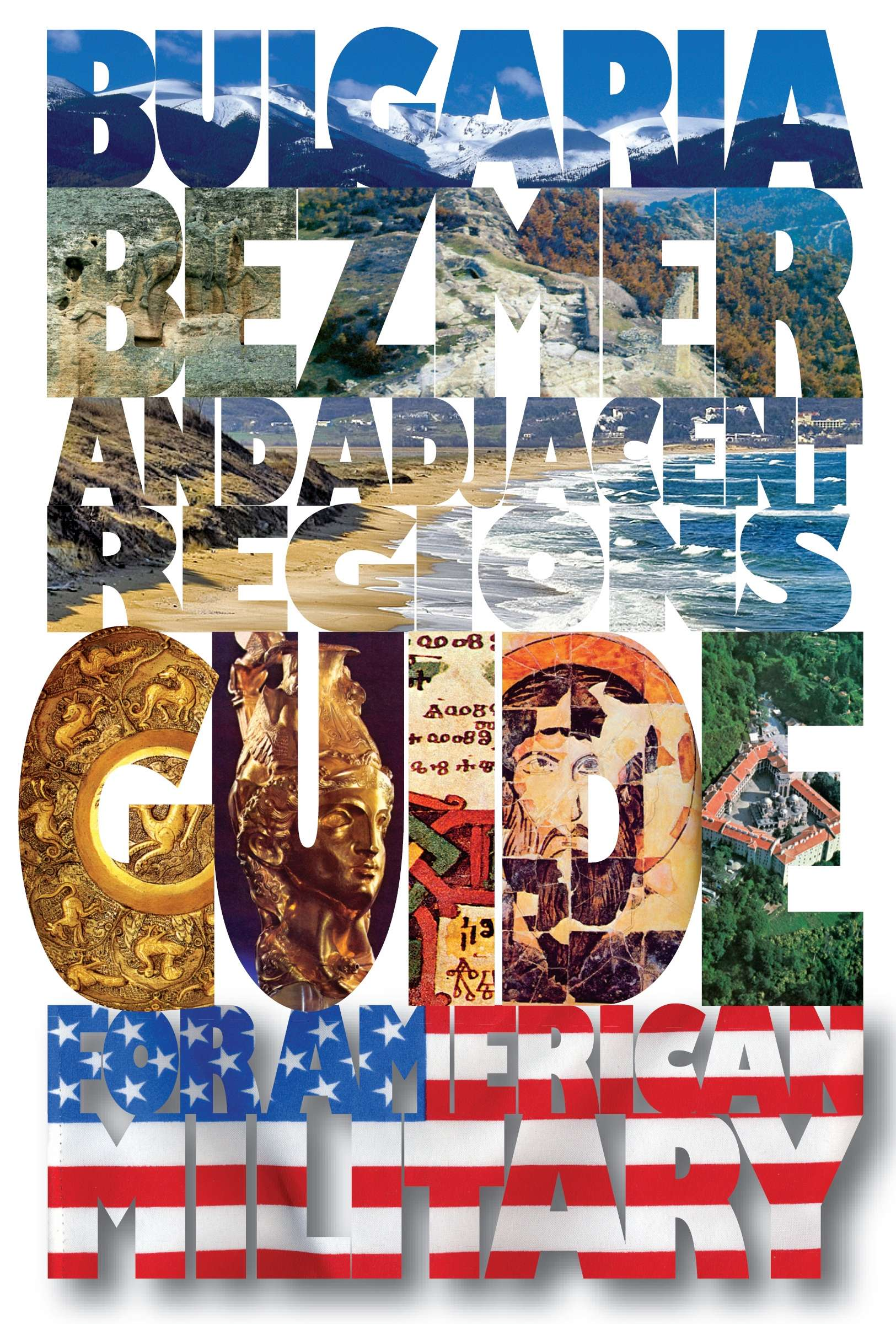

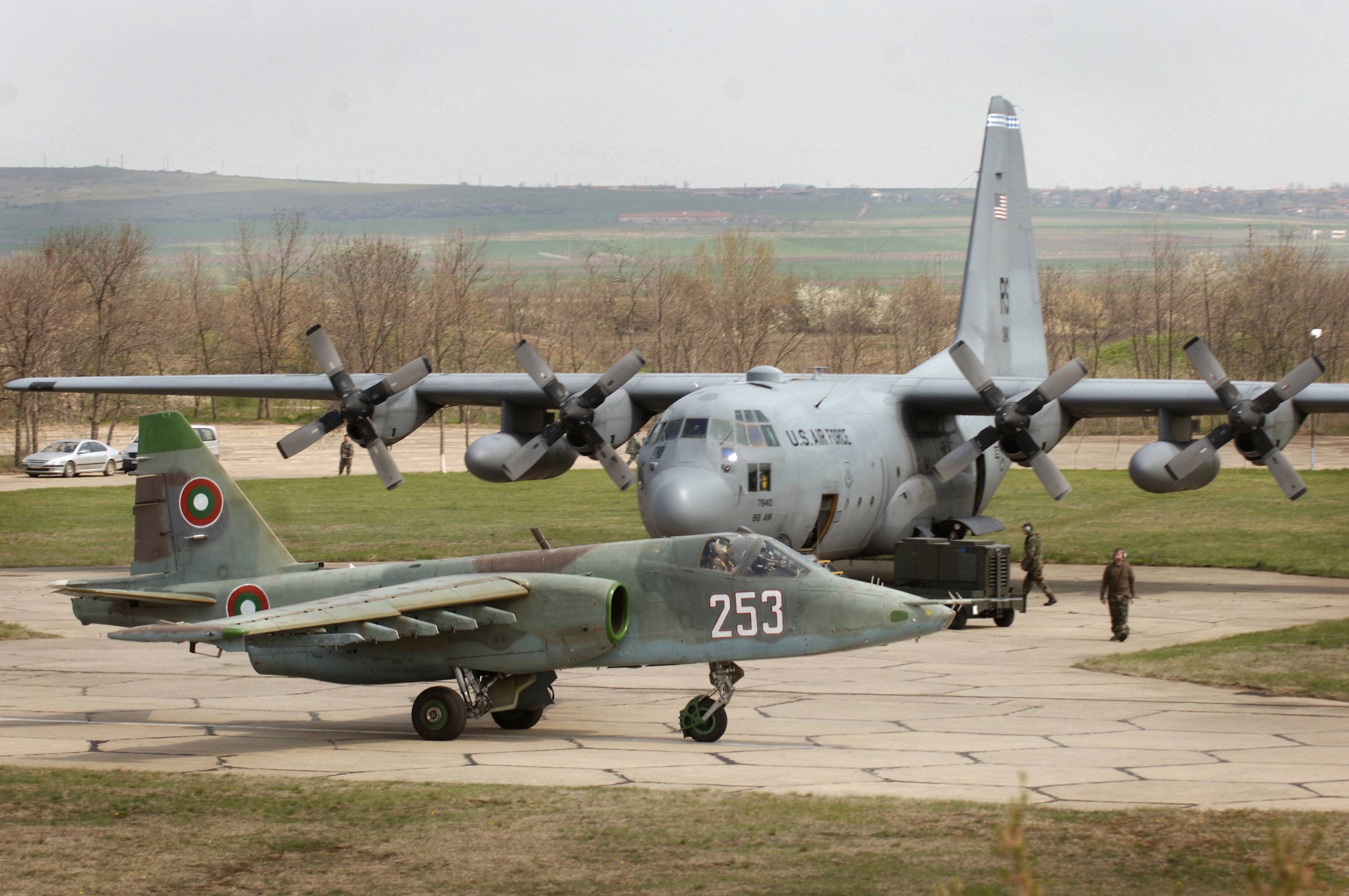

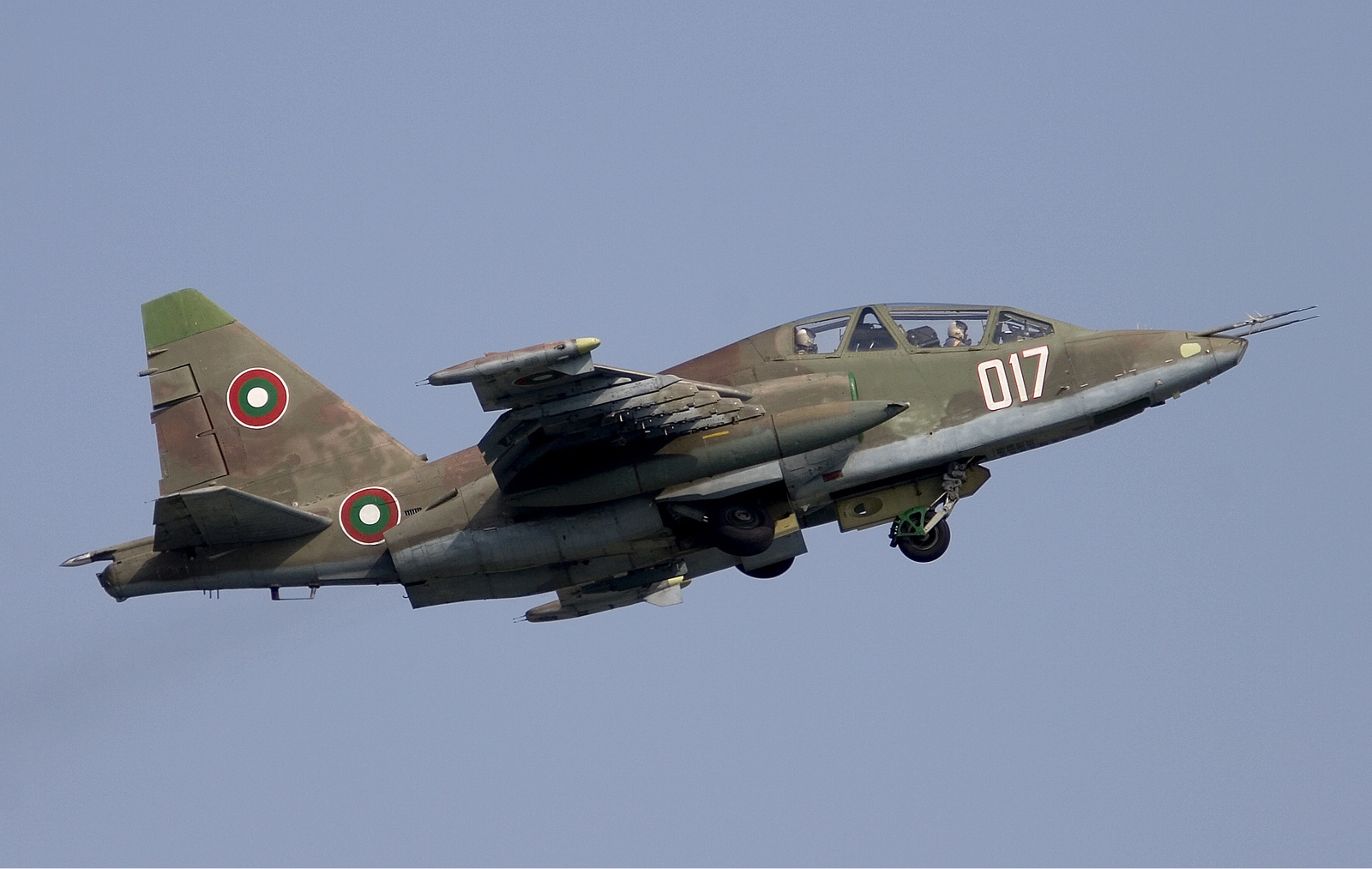

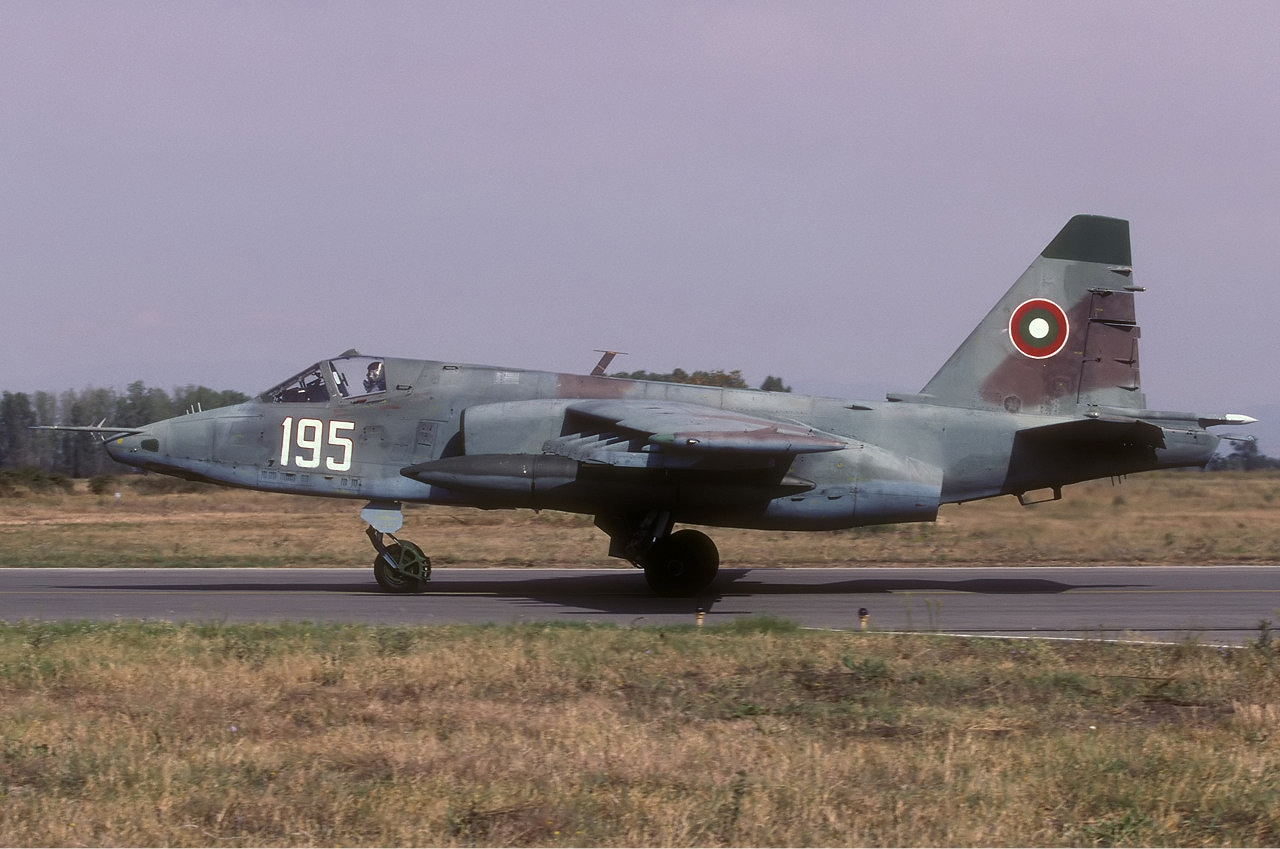

== See also ==
- Dobrich Air Base
- Graf Ignatievo Air Base
- Gabrovnitsa Air Base
- Cheshnegirovo Air Base
- Dobroslavtsi Air Base
- Uzundzhovo Air Base
- Ravnets Air Base
- Vrazhdebna Air Base
- List of Bulgarian Air Force bases
- List of Bulgarian military bases
- 28th Air Detachment
- Bulgaria
- Military of Bulgaria
- Bulgarian cosmonaut program
- List of joint US-Bulgarian military bases
- Bulgarian-American Joint Military Facilities
