= List of Bulgarian military bases =

- Vrazhdebna Air Base, Sofia
- Graf Ignatievo Air Base, Plovdiv region
- Krumovo Air Base, Plovdiv region
- Bezmer Air Base, Yambol region
- Nebneb Air Base, Burgas region
- Dolna Mitropoliya Air Base, Pleven region
- Varna Naval Base, Varna
- Atiya Naval Base, Burgas region
- Chayka Naval Air Base, Varna
- Novo Selo Range in Sliven region
- Aytos Logistics Center in Burgas region

== See also ==
- Lists of military installations
