= Bulgarian–American Joint Military Facilities =

U.S. forces training at Bulgarian military installations

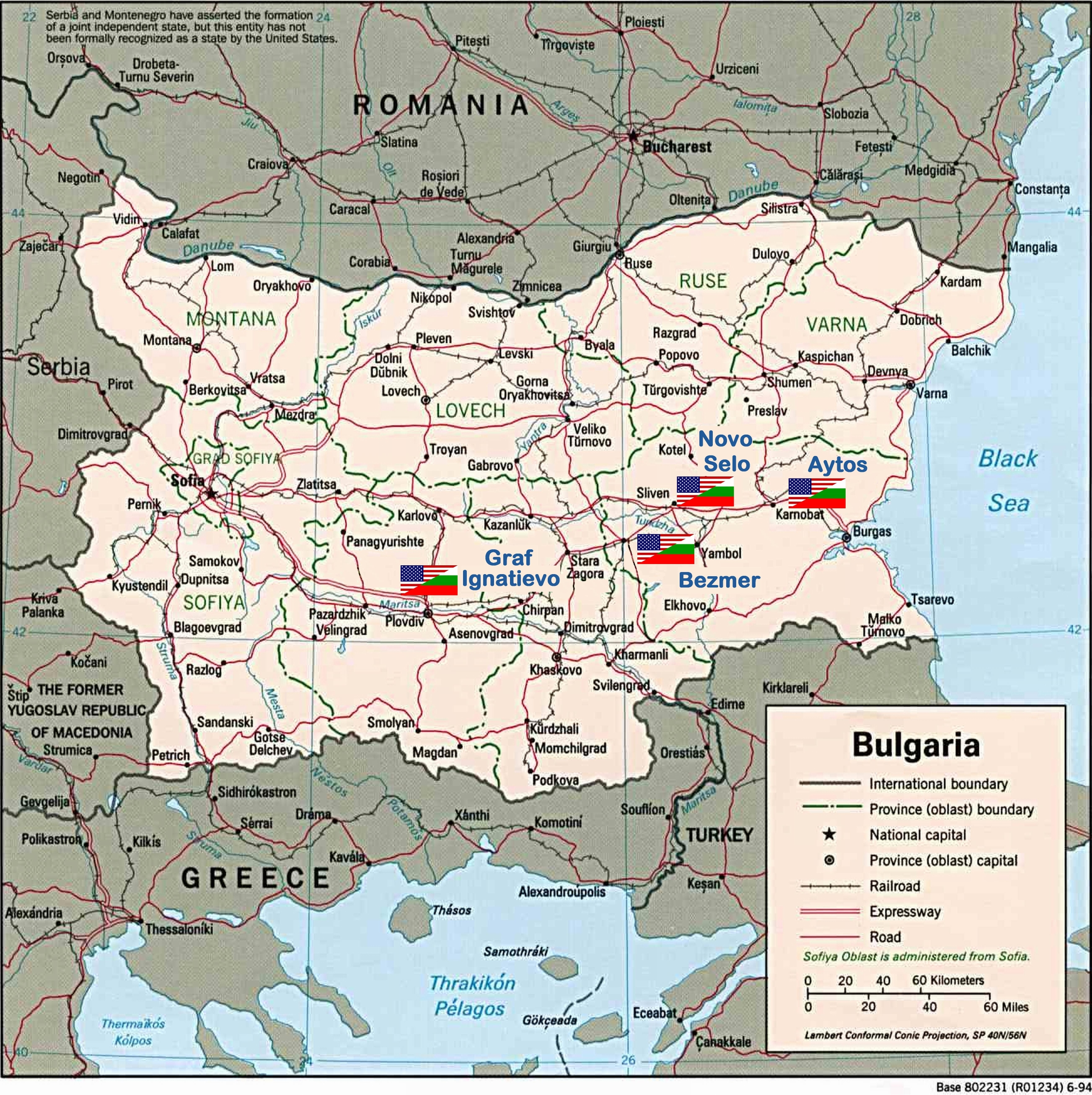
Joint US-Bulgarian military bases

Bulgarian–American Joint Military Facilities were established by a Defence Cooperation Agreement signed by the United States and Bulgaria in April 2006. Under the agreement, U.S. forces will train at these bases, which remain under Bulgarian command and the Bulgarian flag.

== History ==
On April 28, 2006, in Sofia, Bulgarian Foreign Minister Ivaylo Kalfin and U.S. Secretary of State Condoleezza Rice signed a Defense Cooperation Agreement (DCA), which includes the range, order, and conditions of the shared use of several military facilities on Bulgarian territory. On May 26, 2006, the Bulgarian Parliament ratified the Defense Cooperation Agreement and the Bulgarian State Gazette published the Ratification Law on June 6, 2006.

The Defense Cooperation Agreement entered into force on June 12, 2006. Additional agreements, concerning the specifics of the Defense Cooperation Agreement implementation, are expected to be finalized in 2007. Another agreement with Romania permits the U.S. to use the Mihail Kogălniceanu base and another one nearby.

The U.S. has also signed a similar agreement with Romania and the U.S. military units deployed to both Bulgaria and Romania will be known as Joint Task Force East. Joint US-Bulgarian military bases established according to the 2006 Defense Cooperation Agreement between the United States and Bulgaria:

- Bezmer Air Base in Yambol Province
- Novo Selo Range in Sliven Province
- Aitos Logistics Center in Burgas Province
- Graf Ignatievo Air Base in Plovdiv Province

The US 2nd Stryker Cavalry Regiment troops during a Joint Task Force-East exercise at Novo Selo Training Area, 2009.

Under the agreement, no more than 2,500 U.S. military personnel will be located at the joint military facilities. Most training rotations will have small numbers and will be of short duration. During such a rotation, there might be brief periods when there are two groups of 2500 soldiers at one time in Bulgaria. The soldiers will not have family members with them.

Possible types of units are armor, mechanized infantry, airborne infantry or light infantry. The type of equipment they will use will depend on the unit and the training requirements.

The treaty also allows the US to use the bases "for missions in third country without a specific authorization from Bulgarian authorities". The U.S. Embassy has said that Bulgaria and the United States will consult about all aspects of the use of the facilities and training areas.

The Bezmer Air Base is expected to become one of the major US strategic airfields overseas, housing American combat aircraft.

The DCA accords immunity to US militaries protecting them from any juridical pursuits against them in this country. However, in cases of particular importance to Bulgarian authorities that waiver of primary Bulgarian criminal jurisdiction may be recalled (Paragraph 1, Article X of the Defense Cooperation Agreement). The U.S. Embassy has said the agreement builds on the NATO Status of Forces Agreement (SOFA). Bulgaria retains the right to exercise its jurisdiction when it is in Bulgaria's interest. In other cases, the United States will exercise jurisdiction over U.S. military and civilian personnel.

== In the media ==
In 2006 Foreign Policy magazine listed Bezmer Air Base as one of the six most important overseas facilities used by the USAF due to its proximity to the Middle East.

== See also ==
- Bulgaria–United States relations
- List of United States military bases
- Forward Operating Site
- NATO–Russia relations
