= Gabrovnitsa Air Base =

- Авиобаза Габровница
- Gabrovnitsa, Bulgaria

Site information
- Type: Former Military Air Base
- Operator: Bulgarian Air Force
- Controlled by: Bulgarian Air Force

Location
- Location within Bulgaria
- Coordinates: 43°32′39″N 023°16′21″E

Site history
- In use: Until 2002

Airfield information
- Identifiers: ICAO: LBMG
- Elevation: 191 metres (627 ft) AMSL
Runways
| Direction | Length and surface |
|---|---|
| 11/29 | 2,522 metres (8,274 ft) Concrete |

Gabrovnitsa Air Base (Bulgarian: авиобаза Габровница) or 2nd Fighter Air Base (ICAO: LBMG) is a former Bulgarian Air Force air base. It was built outside Gabrovnitsa near Montana in north western Bulgaria. The base was home to the 11th FAR, then the 2nd Sqn of the 18th FAR, 1st Air Defence Division. It closed in 1998 and was demolished.

== See also ==
- List of Bulgarian Air Force Bases
- List of airports in Bulgaria
- List of Bulgarian military bases
- 28th Air Detachment
