= Outline of the Bulgarian People's Army at the end of the Cold War =

The following is a hierarchical outline for the Bulgarian People's Army at the end of the Cold War. It is intended to convey the connections and relationships between units and formations. At the end of the Cold War in 1989, the Bulgarian People's Army (BPA) reported to the Ministry of People's Defence (Bulgaria). The BPA included the Bulgarian Land Forces; the Air and Air Defence Forces; Navy; and Construction Troops.

The Interior Ministry supervised the Border Troops, Interior Troops, Transport Troops, and Communications Troops.

== War Planning ==
In case of war the Bulgarian People's Army's Land Forces Command would have formed the 1st Balkan Front with multiple Bulgarian armies and wartime reinforcements. Two Bulgarian armies, four to six motorized rifle divisions and three tank brigades, the CIA estimated in 1979, would be assigned to this Front (page 149/201). Additional Soviet units would also come under its command (particularly 10th Army of the Soviet Union (10th Guards Budapest Rifle Corps?, which later became the 14th Guards Army), planned to deploy between the fifth and tenth day after a full mobilization in the area between Silistra, Tolbukhin, Varna and Omurtag).

According to Lieutenant-General Hristo Hristov (former Chief of the Land Forces and Chief of the Georgi Rakovski Military Academy): "For that purpose the Land Forces Command was formed in 1973. Its first chief was Colonel-General Hristo Dobrev, with the rank of Deputy Minister of People's Defence. At a conference about the organization of the armed forces in 2003 he has formulated the need for the formation of the Land Forces Command as such: "It is well known, that according to the operational plans of the Supreme Headquarters of the Warsaw Pact Organization our country was supposed to form a frontal Operational-Strategical Formation (фронтово оперативно-стратегическо обединение), mainly including the Bulgarian People's Army with the mission in case of an aggression launched against the People's Republic of Bulgaria to mount defensive action on the southern state border in order to secure the deployment on Bulgarian soil of additionally one Soviet and one Romanian front. ..Our Land Forces at the moment [the 1970s] numbered around 60-62 000 men, the exercises were constant. Each division executed annually one winter and one summer exercise in full strength. The three army headquarters - one command exercise under the leadership of the respective army commander and one command exercise under the leadership of the Land Forces Main Staff annually. The massive exercises of the Land Forces, normally during the summers normally included an army headquarters from the Soviet Army and occasionally an army headquarters from the Romanian Army. On the Balkan operational direction our armed forces were planned to cooperate with them."

After which with the support of the Soviet Strategic Missile Troops the three fronts were, with the support of the Soviet Black Sea Fleet [which at that point would have absorbed the Bulgarian and the Romanian Navies] to launch a strategic operation aimed at the total destruction of the aggressor... Our men were excellent trained.

The Ministry for People's Defence (Министерство на Народната Отбрана (МНО)) had the following structure:

Minister of People's Defence (Министър на народната отбрана)

- Command and Office of the Minister of People's Defence (Командване с кабинет на министъра на народната отбрана)
- Management Council (Колегиум)
- Financial Department (Финансов отдел)
- Control and Revision Directorate (Контролно-ревизионно управление)
- Rear [Services] of the Bulgarian People's Army (Тил на БНА), headed by a Deputy Minister for People's Defence
  - Rear [Services] HQ (Щаб на тила)
  - Equipment Directorate (Вещево управление)
  - Proviant Directorate (Продоволствено управление)
  - Fuel and Lubricants Directorate (Управление ГСМ)
  - Medical Directorate (Медицинско управление)
  - Transportation Directorate (Транспортно управление)
  - Political Department (Политотдел)
  - Housing Exploitation Department (Квартирно-експ. отдел)
  - Economic Planning Department (Планово-икономически отдел)
- Political Department (Политотдел), all the Political Departments were subordinated to the Main Political Directorate of the People's Army. The Rear [Services], the Main Directorate for Armament and Equipment and the General Staff were each headed by a Deputy Minister of People's Defence and each had its own political department. This particular one was responsible for the Ministry's departments subordinated directly to the Minister.
- Military Legal Establishments Department (Отдел Военносъдебни учреждения)
- Main Political Directorate of the People's Army (Главно политическо управление на народната армия (ГлПУНА)), had the dual status of a directorate of the Ministry of People's Defence and a Department of the Bulgarian Communist Party's Central Committee
- Inspectorate of the Ministry of People's Defence (Инспекторат на МНО)
- Cadre [Human Resources] Directorate (Управление кадри)
- Main Directorate for Armament and Equipment (Главно управление на въоръжението и техниката (ГУВТ)), headed by a Deputy Minister for People's Defence
  - Scientific Technological Directorate (Научно-техн. управление)
  - Automotive and Armored Vehicles Directorate (Управление авто- и бронетанкова техника (АБТТ))
  - Rocket and Artillery Armament and Radar Equipment Directorate (Управление ракетно и артилерийско въоръжение и радиолокационна техника (Управление РАВ и РЛТ))
  - Delivery Planning Directorate (Управление Планиране на доставките)
  - Military Repair Plants and Armament Manufacturing Factories Directorate (Управление Военно-ремонтни бази и заводи)
  - Political Department (Политотдел)
  - Technical Organization Department (Организационно-технически отдел)
- Civil Protection HQ (Щаб на гражданската отбрана)
- Engineer Troops Directorate (Управление инженерни войски)
- Chemical Troops Directorate (Управление химически войски)

General Staff of the Bulgarian People's Army (Генерален щаб на Българската народна армия (ГЩ на БНА)), headed by the First Deputy Minister for People's Defence, the General Staff was a separate structure from the Ministry of People's Defence

- Operations Directorate (Оперативно управление)
- Intelligence Directorate (Разузнавателно управление)
- Signals Troops Directorate (Управление свързочни войски)
- Organization and Mobilization Directorate (Организационно-мобилизационно управление)
- Mobilization Planning Directorate (Мобилизационно-планово управление)
- Political Department (Политотдел)
- Military Scientific Sector (Военно-научен сектор)
- Mechanization and Automatization of the Command and Control of the Troops Department (Механизация и автоматизация на упр. на войските)
- Department for the Safeguarding of State and Operational Secrets (Опазване на държавната и служебната тайна)
- Electronic Warfare Department (Радиоелектронна борба)
- Preparation of the State for Defence Department (Подготовка на страната за отбрана)
- Military Topographical Department (Военнотопографски отдел)
- Air Defence Sector (Сектор ПВО)
- Naval Department (Отдел ВМФ)
- International Military Liaison Department (Отдел международни връзки)

== 1st Balkan Front ==
The headquarters of the 1st Balkan Front had direct command of the following units:

Frontal Command, Sofia

- Directly Subordinated
  - Intelligence Directorate of the General Staff:
    - 68th Independent Parachute-Reconnaissance Regiment (Plovdiv, an equivalent of the Soviet GRU-Spetsnaz, the Intelligence Directorate even had a "Spetsnaz"-Department with that exact name and the responsibility for combat readiness and mission planning of the Specnaz units). The regiment was formed on October 1, 1975, by bringing together the battalion-sized 68th (in Plovdiv) and 86th Training Parachute-Reconnaissance Base (in Musachevo village, immediately to the east of Sofia. The bases, called "Training" (Учебна Парашутно-Разузнавателна База - Резерв на Главното Командване (УПРБ-РГК)) for maskirovka were special mission units, directly subordinated to the General Staff with the capabilities to execute covert intelligence gathering and direct actions deep in the enemy rear of the two NATO adversaries in the region - Greece and Turkey respectively. Each of the bases was composed of a Command; Staff and Staff Services; 3 Para-Recon Companies of 6 Para-Recon Groups each (composed of 7 people: a commanding officer, a master sergeant executive commander, a radiotelegraphist, a senior intelligence gatherer, an intelligence gatherer, an intelligence gatherer/ grenadier and a military interpreter); a Training Company, a Signals Company and diverse support and supply units. The newly formed 68th IPRR included a Command; Staff and Staff Services; 3 x Para-Recon Battalions; Diversionary-Reconnaissance Detachment (reinforced company, specialised in direct actions, upgraded to a full battalion in 1989); Training Battalion; Signals Battalion and support and supply units. The full compliance to Soviet GRU-Spetsnaz standards since the formation of the regiment is also noted in the specification of the Para-Recon Groups, which were renamed Spetsnaz-Reconnaissance Groups (Разузнавателни Групи със Специално Назначение (РГСН)). The regiment is the forerunner of the modern 68th Special Forces Brigade.
    - 81st (?). Independent Brigade for Radio-intercept and Radio-technical Reconnaissance OSNAZ (81-ва (?). Отделната Бригада за Радио и Радиотехническо Разузнаване ОСНАЗ) in Musachevo, just to the east of Sofia (the ELINT and Radio Interception units of the BPA were called OSNAZ from the Russian ОСобое НАЗначение (roughly translated as "of specific purpose"), Electronic Warfare, such as the N, S and NS type units were called SPETSNAZ (same as the special forces units) from the Russian СПЕЦиальное НАЗначение (translated as "of special purpose"))
  - Directorate for Signals and Electronics of the General Staff:
    - 62nd Signals Brigade, in Gorna Malina - with the escalation in the nuclear armament of NATO and the Warsaw Pact a plan was devised by the Bulgarian government, that in the case of a full-sized conflict, to retain command and control, the higher echelon of the Bulgarian Communist Party and the senior military command was to be divided in three groups and evacuated to nuclear blast-protected bunkers in the Bulgarian mountains. Next to the functions of the Signals Regiment in the Sofia suburb of Suhodol, the brigade also had the functions of maintaining the higher military communication lines. For that reason the 62nd Brigade had at least three dispersed signals regiments for government communications, such as the 75th Signals Regiment (Lovech), the 65th Signals Regiment (Nova Zagora) and at least one additional unknown Signals Regiment in the Rila-Pirin mountain massif. The modern successor of the 62nd Signals Brigade are the Stationary Communication and Information System (Стационарна Комуникационна Информационна Система (СКИС)) of the Defence Staff (which fulfills also the tasks of SIGINT and Cyber Defence next to its strategic communications mission) and the Mobile Communication and Information System (Мобилна Комуникационна Информационна Система (МКИС)) of the Joint Forces Command.
  - Electronic Warfare Department (Отдел за Радиоелектронна Борба към Генералния Щаб (ОРЕБ-ГЩ)) (a General Staff department, headed by a Colonel)
    - Stationary Battalion for Radiojamming (Стационарен Батальон за Радиосмущения)
    - Unit for Radioelectronic Control (Отряд за Радиоелектронен Контрол) (The unit's task was to control the radioelectronic signature of the own forces and to manage their survivability against jamming by the enemy. U.S. DOD "electronic protection".)
    - Central Workshop (Централна Работилница)
    - several Signals intelligence units including in Berkovitsa, Gorna Oryahovitsa etc.
  - Higher Military Medical Institute, in Sofia (Висш Военно-Медицински Институт (ВВМИ)), the armed forces' medical service. The Director of the Higher Military Medical Institute was in charge of all medical and recreational units of the BPA and was also the armed forces' Surgeon-General.

=== Land Forces ===
- Directly Subordinated
  - 76th Missile Brigade, in Telish, with 8x OTR-23 Oka ballistic missile launchers
  - 135th Front Mobile Missile-Technical Base, in Telish
  - 31st Frontal Anti-aircraft Missile Brigade, in Stara Zagora, with 3x anti-aircraft missile divisions armed with 2K11 Krug air defence systems
  - Electronic Warfare Service (Служба за Радиоелектронна Борба (Служба РЕБ)) (a General Staff department, headed by a Colonel)
    - Independent Frontal Electronic Warfare Battalion type "NS" (Отделен Фронтови Батальон за Радиоелектронна Борба тип "НС"), splits in wartime in
      - Independent Frontal Electronic Warfare Battalion type "N" (Отделен Фронтови Батальон за Радиоелектронна Борба тип "Н") (tasked to jam the enemy communications)
      - Independent Frontal Electronic Warfare Battalion type "S" (Отделен Фронтови Батальон за Радиоелектронна Борба тип "С") (tasked to jam the enemy's targeting systems and thus protect the own forces and locations from guided weapons)
  - 3rd Frontal Radio-technical Battalion, in Nova Zagora
  - 55th Pontoon Engineer Brigade, in Belene (tasked with ensuring that Romanian and Soviet reinforcements could cross the Danube)

The Bulgarian People's Army education institutions would have formed the following units in wartime:

- "Georgi Sava Rakovski" Military Academy, in Sofia - a motor rifle division
- "Vasil Levski" People's Higher Combined Arms School, in Veliko Tarnovo - a motor rifle division
- "Hristo Botev" Reserve Officers School, in Pleven - a motor rifle division
- "Georgi Benkovski" People's Higher Air Force School, in Dolna Mitropoliya - a motor rifle division
- "Georgi Dimitrov" People's Artillery and Air Defence Forces School, in Shumen - a front artillery division and an anti-tank artillery brigade
  - 84th Front Artillery Division - Reserve of the High Command (84-та Фронтова Артилерийска Дивизия - Резерв на Главното Командване) - formed for the massive Shield-82 (Щит-82) exercise of the Warsaw Pact Organisation, after which put in cadre status. Each brigade included four fire divisions of 18 pieces each, for a total of 72 systems in each brigade.
    - Division HQ
    - 85th Mixed Artillery Brigade (85-а Смесена Артилерийска Бригада) (100-mm BS-3 guns and 122-mm 2А-19 guns)
    - 86th Heavy Howitzer Artillery Brigade (86-а Тежка Гаубична Артилерийска Бригада) (152-mm D-20 gun-howitzers)
    - 87th Howitzer Artillery Brigade (87-а Гаубична Артилерийска Бригада) (122-mm М-30 howitzers)
    - 89th Rocket Artillery Brigade (89-а Реактивна Артилерийска Бригада) (BM-21 "Grad" MLRS)
  - Destroyer Anti-Tank Artillery Brigade - Reserve of the High Command (Изтребителна Противотанкова Артилерийска Бригада - РГК (ИПТАБр - РГК))
    - Command; Staff; Command and Reconnaissance Battery; 5 DATA-divisions of 3 batteries of 6 MT-12 antitank guns and supporting units

==== 1st Army ====
- 1st Army, in Sofia, with the strike direction of Yugoslavia and Greece
  - 1st Motor Rifle Division, in Slivnitsa (bg:Първа мотострелкова дивизия)
    - 3rd Motor Rifle Regiment, in Slivnitsa
    - 5th Motor Rifle Regiment, in Slivnitsa
    - 48th Motor Rifle Regiment, in Breznik
    - 65th Tank Regiment, in Botevgrad
    - 18th Artillery Regiment, in Bozhurishte
    - 37th Anti-aircraft Missile Regiment, in Slivnitsa
    - 1st Reconnaissance Battalion
    - 1st Anti-tank Artillery Battalion
    - 1st Missile Battalion, in Samokov
    - 1st Multiple Rocket Launch Artillery Battalion
    - 1st Engineer Battalion
    - 1st Signal Battalion, in Slivnitsa
    - 1st Transport Battalion
    - 1st Supply Battalion
    - 1st Maintenance Battalion
    - 1st Artillery Reconnaissance and Control Battery
    - 1st Chemical Defence Company
    - 1st Commandant's Company (Military Police)
    - 1st Divisional Detachment for Medical Support (Medical-Sanitary Battalion in wartime)
  - 3rd Motor Rifle Division, in Blagoevgrad (bg:Трета мотострелкова дивизия)
    - 14th Motor Rifle Regiment, in Simitli
    - 19th Motor Rifle Regiment, in Kresna and Sandanski)
    - 28th Motor Rifle Regiment, in Gotse Delchev
    - 11th Tank Regiment, in Bansko
    - 36th Artillery Regiment, in Razlog
    - 49th Anti-aircraft Missile Regiment, in Blagoevgrad
    - 3rd Reconnaissance Battalion
    - 3rd Self-propelled Field Artillery Battalion, in Bansko
    - 3rd Anti-tank Artillery Battalion, in Simitli
    - 3rd Missile Battalion, in Grudovo, in Razlog
    - 3rd Multiple Rocket Launch Artillery Battalion
    - 3rd Engineer Battalion
    - 3rd Signal Battalion
    - 3rd Transport Battalion
    - 3rd Supply Battalion
    - 3rd Maintenance Battalion
    - 3rd Artillery Reconnaissance and Control Battery
    - 3rd Chemical Defence Company
    - 3rd Commandant's Company (Military Police)
    - 3rd Divisional Detachment for Medical Support (Medical-Sanitary Battalion in wartime)
  - 21st Motor Rifle Division, in Pazardzhik (a training/reserve formation to be brought up to strength in times of war)
    - 30th Motor Rifle Regiment, in Pazardzhik
    - 101st Motor Rifle Regiment, in Smolyan - from September 1, 1961.
    - 102nd Motor Rifle Regiment, in Devin
    - 103rd Motor Rifle Regiment, in Ardino
    - 105th Artillery Regiment, in Smolyan
    - Anti-aircraft Missile Regiment
    - 21st Reconnaissance Battalion
    - 21st Anti-tank Artillery Battalion
    - 21st Missile Battalion, in Pazardzhik
    - 21st Multiple Rocket Launch Artillery Battalion
    - 21st Engineer Battalion
    - 21st Signal Battalion
    - 21st Transport Battalion
    - 21st Supply Battalion
    - 21st Maintenance Battalion
    - 21st Artillery Reconnaissance and Control Battery
    - 21st Chemical Defence Company
    - 21st Commandant's Company (Military Police)
    - 21st Divisional Detachment for Medical Support (Medical-Sanitary Battalion in wartime)
  - 9th Tank Brigade, in Gorna Banya suburb of Sofia - according to the memories of Colonel (Ret.) Yanko Roshkev, the brigade's commanding officer at the end of the 1980s and the beginning of the 1990s, the brigade had a special force structure, due to its immediate proximity to the country's capital. It had a total of 182 main battle tanks in 3 tank battalions (1st, 2nd and 3rd Tank Battalions of 49 MBTs each), 1 regular (9th Motor Rifle Battalion) and 1 mobilization (10th Motor Rifle Battalion, mobilized around the political changes in the end of 1989) motor rifle battalions (each with its own tank company of (10 MBTs each?) and an additional separate tank company (of 13 MBTs ?) for the security of the General Staff building in Sofia and 2MBTs in the Brigade HQ for the brigade's CO and XO.
  - 46th Army Tactical Missile Brigade, in Samokov
  - 128th Mobile Missile-Technical Base, in Samokov
  - 5th Army Artillery Regiment, in Samokov
  - 35th Army Anti-Tank Artillery Regiment in Samoranovo
    - Command (Командване)
    - Staff (Щаб)
    - Reconnaissance and Fire Control Battery (Батарея за Разузнаване и Управление (БРУ))
    - 1st Destroyer Anti-Tank Artillery Division (1ви Изтребителен Противотанков Артилерийски Дивизион (1ви ИПТАДн)
      - 1st, 2nd and 3rd Batteries - 6x MT-12 antitank guns per battery
    - 2nd Destroyer Anti-Tank Artillery Division (2ри Изтребителен Противотанков Артилерийски Дивизион (2ри ИПТАДн)
      - 4th, 5th and 6th Batteries - 6x MT-12 antitank guns per battery
    - 3rd Destroyer Anti-Tank Artillery Division (3ти Изтребителен Противотанков Артилерийски Дивизион (3ти ИПТАДн)
      - 7th, 8th and 9th Batteries - 6x 100mm self-propelled SAU-100 (probably PT-SAU T-100 tank destroyers on T-34 chassis?)
    - 4th Destroyer Anti-Tank Artillery Division (4ти Изтребителен Противотанков Артилерийски Дивизион (4ти ИПТАДн)
      - 10th, 11th and 12th Batteries - 6x 100mm self-propelled SAU-100 (probably PT-SAU T-100 tank destroyers on T-34 chassis?)
    - support units
  - Army Air Defence Artillery Regiment (in wartime 4 divisions x 4 batteries x 6 100 mm air defense guns KS-19, reduced strength in peacetime, only for training - 2 divisions x 1 battery x 2 platoons of a single gun each)
  - 1st Army Radio-technical Battalion, in Sofia
  - 59th Army Chemical Defence Regiment, in Musachevo
  - 88th Army Engineer Regiment, in Kyustendil
  - 97th Army Signal Regiment, in Sofia
  - 1st Army Independent Electronic Warfare Battalion type "N", in Sofia
  - 1st Army Cable Laying Signal Battalion in Sofia
  - 1st Parachute-Reconnaissance Battalion, in Gorna Banya suburb of Sofia
  - Army Artillery-Reconnaissance Battalion
  - Pontoon Bridge Engineer Battalion, in Kyustendil

==== 2nd Army ====
- 2nd Army, in Plovdiv, with the strike direction of Greece and Turkey
  - 2nd Motor Rifle Division, in Stara Zagora (bg:Втора мотострелкова дивизия)
    - 22nd Motor Rifle Regiment, in Harmanli
    - 38th Motor Rifle Regiment, in Stara Zagora
    - 49th Motor Rifle Regiment, in Simeonovgrad
    - 196th Motor Rifle Regiment, in Chirpan
    - 41st Artillery Regiment, in Stara Zagora
    - Anti-aircraft Missile Regiment, in Nova Zagora
    - 2nd Reconnaissance Battalion
    - 2nd Anti-tank Artillery Battalion
    - 2nd Missile Battalion, in Stara Zagora
    - 2nd Multiple Rocket Launch Artillery Battalion
    - 2nd Engineer Battalion
    - 2nd Signal Battalion, in Nova Zagora
    - 2nd Transport Battalion
    - 2nd Supply Battalion
    - 2nd Maintenance Battalion
    - 2nd Artillery Reconnaissance and Control Battery
    - 2nd Chemical Defence Company
    - 2nd Commandant's Company (Military Police)
    - 2nd Divisional Detachment for Medical Support (Medical-Sanitary Battalion in wartime)
  - 17th Motor Rifle Division, in Haskovo
    - 31st Motor Rifle Regiment, in Haskovo
    - 34th Motor Rifle Regiment, in Momchilgrad
    - 78th Motor Rifle Regiment, in Krumovgrad
    - 66th Motor Rifle Regiment, in Haskovo
    - 87th Artillery Regiment, in Kardzhali
    - 66th Anti-aircraft Missile Regiment, in Dimitrovgrad
    - 17th Reconnaissance Battalion
    - 17th Anti-tank Artillery Battalion
    - 17th Missile Battalion, in Dimitrovgrad
    - 17th Multiple Rocket Launch Artillery Battalion
    - 17th Engineer Battalion
    - 17th Signal Battalion, in Ivaylovgrad
    - 17th Transport Battalion
    - 17th Supply Battalion
    - 17th Maintenance Battalion
    - 17th Artillery Reconnaissance and Control Battery
    - 17th Chemical Defence Company
    - 17th Commandant's Company (Military Police)
    - 17th Divisional Detachment for Medical Support (Medical-Sanitary Battalion in wartime)
  - 5th Tank Brigade, in Kazanlak
  - 11th Tank Brigade, in Karlovo
  - 56th Army Tactical Missile Brigade, in Marino Pole
  - 129th Mobile Missile-Technical Base, in Marino Pole
  - 4th Army Artillery Regiment, in Asenovgrad
  - 23rd Army Destroyer Anti-Tank Artillery Regiment (23ти Армейски Изтребителен Противотанков Артилерийски Полк (23ти АИПТАП)) in Plovdiv (around 1988-89 the regiment received 9M113 Konkurs, mounted on BRDM-2 (the ATGM-armed variant is known as BRDM-3) and became of mixed structure with 3 ATGM and 6 artillery batteries. On 1. September 1989 converted to 23rd Department for Reservists and Anti-Tank Artillery Training and Armament and Equipment Storage (23ти Отдел за Подготовка на Резервисти и Противотанкова Артилерия и Съхранение на Въоръжение и Техника (23ти ОПРПАСВТ))
    - 1st Destroyer Anti-Tank Artillery Division (1ви Изтребителен Противотанков Артилерийски Дивизион (1ви ИПТАДн))
      - 1st Battery - 4x BRDM-3; 2nd and 3rd Batteries - 6x MT-12 antitank guns
    - 2nd Destroyer Anti-Tank Artillery Division (2ри Изтребителен Противотанков Артилерийски Дивизион (2ри ИПТАДн))
      - 4th Battery - 4x BRDM-3; 5th and 6th Batteries - 6x MT-12 antitank guns
    - 3rd Destroyer Anti-Tank Artillery Division (3ти Изтребителен Противотанков Артилерийски Дивизион (3ти ИПТАДн))
      - 7th Battery - 4x BRDM-3; 8th and 9th Batteries - 6x MT-12 antitank guns
  - Army Air Defence Artillery Regiment (in wartime 4 divisions x 4 batteries x 6 100 mm air defense guns KS-19, reduced strength in peacetime, only for training - 2 divisions x 1 battery x 2 platoons of a single gun each)
  - 2nd Army Radio-technical Battalion, in Plovdiv
  - Army Chemical Defence Regiment
  - Army Engineer Regiment
  - Army Signal Regiment, in Plovdiv
  - 2nd Army Independent Electronic Warfare Battalion type "N", in Parvomay
  - 2nd Army Cable Laying Signal Battalion, in Plovdiv
  - 2nd Parachute Reconnaissance Battalion, in Sliven
  - Army Artillery-Reconnaissance Battalion

==== 3rd Army ====
- 3rd Army, in Sliven, with the strike direction of Turkey
  - 7th Motor Rifle Division, in Yambol (bg:Седма мотострелкова дивизия)
    - 12th Motor Rifle Regiment, in Elhovo
    - 42nd Tank Regiment, in Yambol
    - 53rd Motor Rifle Regiment, in Bolyarovo
    - 82nd Motor Rifle Regiment, in Yambol
    - 20th Artillery Regiment, in Yambol
    - 50th Anti-aircraft Missile Regiment
    - 7th Missile Battalion, in Boyanovo village, Elhovo Municipality
    - 7th Multiple Rocket Launch Artillery Battalion, in Yambol
    - 7th Anti-Tank Artillery Battalion, in Yambol
    - 7th Artillery Reconnaissance and Control Battery, in Yambol
    - 7th Reconnaissance Battalion
    - 7th Engineer Battalion
    - 7th Signal Battalion, in Yambol
    - 7th Transport Battalion, in Yambol
    - 7th Supply Battalion, in Yambol
    - 7th Maintenance Battalion
    - 7th Chemical Defence Company
    - 7th Commandant's Company (Military Police), in Yambol
    - 7th Divisional Detachment for Medical Support (7ми Дивизионен Отряд за Медицинско Осигуряване, Medical-Sanitary Battalion in wartime)
  - 16th Motor Rifle Division, in Burgas
    - 16th Motor Rifle Regiment, in Sredets
    - 33rd Motor Rifle Regiment, in Zvezdets
    - 37th Motor Rifle Regiment, in Tsarevo
    - 96th Motor Rifle Regiment, in Dolni Chiflik
    - 88th Artillery Regiment, in Sredets (at some point in the 1980s reduced to 88th Artillery Support Division)
    - Anti-aircraft Missile Regiment
    - 16th Reconnaissance Battalion
    - 16th Self-propelled Field Artillery Battalion
    - 16th Anti-tank Artillery Battalion
    - 16th Missile Battalion, in Grudovo
    - 16th Multiple Rocket Launch Artillery Battalion
    - 16th Engineer Battalion
    - 16th Signal Battalion
    - 16th Transport Battalion
    - 16th Supply Battalion
    - 16th Maintenance Battalion
    - 16th Artillery Reconnaissance and Control Battery
    - 16th Chemical Defence Company
    - 16th Commandant's Company (Military Police)
    - 16th Divisional Detachment for Medical Support (Medical-Sanitary Battalion in wartime)
  - 18th Motor Rifle Division, in Shumen (maintained as a Not Ready Division - Cadre High Strength (US terms: Category III), a reserve formation to be brought up to strength in time of war)
    - 29th Motor Rifle Regiment, in Shumen
    - 40th Motor Rifle Regiment, in Razgrad
    - 45th Motor Rifle Regiment, in Dobrich
    - 86th Tank Regiment, in Shumen
    - 47th Artillery Regiment, in Targovishte
    - Anti-aircraft Missile Regiment
    - 18th Reconnaissance Battalion
    - 18th Anti-tank Artillery Battalion
    - 18th Missile Battalion, in Shumen
    - 18th Multiple Rocket Launch Artillery Battalion
    - 18th Engineer Battalion
    - 18th Signal Battalion
    - 18th Transport Battalion
    - 18th Supply Battalion
    - 18th Maintenance Battalion
    - 18th Artillery Reconnaissance and Control Battery
    - 18th Chemical Defence Company
    - 18th Commandant's Company (Military Police)
    - 18th Divisional Detachment for Medical Support (Medical-Sanitary Battalion in wartime)
  - 13th Tank Brigade, in Sliven
  - 24th Tank Brigade, in Aytos
  - 66th Army Tactical Missile Brigade, in Kabile
  - 130th Mobile Missile-Technical Base, at Bezmer Air Base
  - 45th Army Artillery Regiment, in Targovishte (each combat division has 3 fire batteries)
    - Regimental Command (Kомандване)
    - Regimental Staff (Щаб)
    - Fire Control Battery (Батарея за Управление)
    - 1st 130-mm Gun Artillery Division (1ви 130-мм Оръдеен Артилерийски Дивизион)
    - 2nd 130-mm Gun Artillery Division (cadred) (2ри 130-мм Оръдеен Артилерийски Дивизион) (кадриран)
    - 3rd 152-mm 152 mm Howitzer-Gun Artillery Division (3ти 152-мм Гаубично-оръдеен Артилерийски Дивизион с МЛ-20)
    - 4th 152-mm 152 mm Howitzer-Gun Artillery Division (cadred) (4ти 152-мм Гаубично-оръдеен Артилерийски Дивизион с МЛ-20) (кадриран)
    - 5th 122-mm Rocket Artillery Division (5ти Реактивен артилерийски дизивион с БМ 21 "Град")
    - Training Mixed Artillery Division (Учебен Смесен Артилерийски Дивизион)
    - support units (обслужващи подразделения)
  - 55th Army Destroyer Anti-Tank Artillery Regiment (55ти Армейски Изтребителен Противотанков Артилерийски Полк (55ти АИПТАП)) in Karnobat (until 1981 the regiment had 1st Division of 3 batteries armed with 9M14 Malyutka, mounted on BRDM-2, 2nd Division of 3 MT-12 batteries (6 guns per battery), 3rd Division of 3 SAU-100 batteries with SAU-100 (PT-SAU T-100 on T-34 chassis) of 6 guns per battery and 4th Division, identical to the 3rd and cadred in peacetime. In 1981 it lost its Malyutka missile systems and transformed to three identical divisions of 3 batteries of 6 MT-12 antitank guns each. Then in 1987 it transferred a division's worth of MT-12s (18 pieces) to the Higher Artillery School in Shumen as mobilization reserve for the formation of a wartime anti-tank division under its cadred Destroyer Anti-Tank Artillery Brigade - Reserve of the High Command. At the same time 55th Regiment received 9M113 Konkurs, mounted on BRDM-2s and converted to mixed structure
    - 1st Destroyer Anti-Tank Artillery Division (1ви Изтребителен Противотанков Артилерийски Дивизион (1ви ИПТАДн))
      - 1st Battery - 4x BRDM-3; 2nd and 3rd Batteries - 6x MT-12 antitank guns
    - 2nd Destroyer Anti-Tank Artillery Division (2ри Изтребителен Противотанков Артилерийски Дивизион (2ри ИПТАДн))
      - 4th Battery - 4x BRDM-3; 5th and 6th Batteries - 6x MT-12 antitank guns
    - 3rd Destroyer Anti-Tank Artillery Division (3ти Изтребителен Противотанков Артилерийски Дивизион (3ти ИПТАДн))
      - 7th Battery - 4x BRDM-3; 8th and 9th Batteries - 6x MT-12 antitank guns
  - Army Air Defence Artillery Regiment (in wartime 4 divisions x 4 batteries x 6 100 mm air defense guns KS-19, reduced strength in peacetime, only for training - 2 divisions x 1 battery x 2 platoons of a single gun each)
  - 3rd Army Radio-technical Battalion, in Sliven
  - Army Chemical Defence Regiment
  - Army Engineer Regiment
  - Army Signal Regiment, in Sliven
  - 3rd Army Independent Electronic Warfare Battalion type "N", in Sliven
  - 3rd Army Cable Laying Signal Battalion, in Sliven
  - 3rd Parachute Reconnaissance Battalion, in Sliven (3ти Парашутно-разузнавателен батальон (3ти ПРБ))
  - Army Artillery-Reconnaissance Battalion

=== Air Forces and Air Defence ===
The headquarters of the Air Forces and Air Defence were in Sofia.

Air Forces and Air Defence Headquarters

- Air Force and Air Defence Headquarters (Щаб на Военновъздушните сили и Противо-въздушната Отбрана (Щаб на ВВС и ПВО)), Sofia (Aviation Square at Tsarigradsko shose, popularly known as the "Fourth Kilometer Area")
  - Electronic Warfare Section (Отделение РЕБ)
    - 89th Independent Electronic Warfare Battalion type "S" (89ти Отделен батальон РЛС тип "С") (Ihtiman Mountain)
  - Central Command Post, in Boyana, Sofia
  - Reserve Command Post, in Bozhurishte
  - Deputy Chief of Staff of the AF and ADF, Chief of the Aerotechnical Engineer Service of the Air Force and Air Defence
    - Scientific Research Base for Exploitation and Repair of Aviation Materiel (Научно-изследователска База за Експлоатация и Ремонт на Авиационна Техника (НИБЕРАТ)) (Vrazhdebna Airfield)
  - Deputy Chief of Staff of the AF and ADF in Charge of Mechanization and Automatization of the Command and Control of the Troops
    - Military Computing Center (Военен Изчислителен Център)
  - Deputy Chief of Staff of the AF and ADF in Charge of Regulation of Air Activities
    - Integrated Joint Air Traffic Control Service (Интегрирана Единна Авиодиспечерска Служба)
  - 16th Transport Air Regiment, Vrazhdebna Airfield (Sofia)
    - 1/16th Transport Air Squadron (unofficially Air Landing - десантна), flying An-24, An-26
    - 2/16th Transport Air Squadron (unofficially Air Transport / Liaison - транспортна / свързочна), flying Let L-410UVP-E, An-30, An-2
    - Special Service Flight, flying 2 Tupolev Tu-134 and 1 Yak-40

When the 10th Mixed Air Corps was formed in 1961 the 16th Transport Air Regiment was part of it, but later it was subordinated directly to the Air Force and Air Defence Forces Headquarters, as the regiment was planned to form Directorate of the Military Transport and Specialised Aviation (Управление на Военнотранспортната и Специалната Авиация (ВТА и СА)) during wartime, when the national airline BGA Balkan would have been mobilized.

The two air defence divisions were coordinated by an Air Defence Command Post in Sofia. The separation line between their areas of responsibility ran along a line from Ruse through Nova Zagora to Svilengrad.

==== 1st Air Defence Division ====
- 1st Air Defence Division, in Bozhurishte, protecting the country's Southwest
  - Dobroslavtsi Airfield (near Sofia)
    - 18th Fighter Air Regiment (18ти Изтребителен Авиационен Полк (18ти ИАП)) (Dobroslavtsi Airfield)
      - 1/18th Fighter Air Squadron, Dobroslavtsi Air Base, flying MiG-23MF/ML/MLA/UB
    - ? Independent Aviation Technical Battalion (? Отделен Авио-технически Батальон (? ОАТБ))
    - 18th Independent Battalion for Signals and Radio- and Lighting Technical Support (18ти Отделен Батальон за Свръзки и Радиосветотехническо Осигуряване (18ти ОБРСТО))
  - Gabrovnitsa Airfield (near Mihaylovgrad, present day Montana)
    - 18th Fighter Air Regiment (18ти Изтребителен Авиационен Полк (18ти ИАП)) (Dobroslavtsi Airfield)
      - 2/18th Fighter Air Squadron, Gabrovnitsa Air Base, flying MiG-23MLD/UB
    - ? Independent Aviation Technical Battalion (? Отделен Авио-технически Батальон (? ОАТБ))
    - 11th Independent Battalion for Signals and Radio- and Lighting Technical Support (11ти Отделен Батальон за Свръзки и Радиосветотехническо Осигуряване (11ти ОБРСТО))
  - 1st Anti-Aircraft Missile Brigade, Bozhurishte, protecting Sofia and Western Bulgaria
    - Brigade Command and Staff (Bozhurishte)
    - Group of Divisions S-200 (Група дивизиони С-200) (Kostinbrod - Ponor village) - S-200 "Vega" SAM
      - 1st Fire Division S-200 (1ви огневи дивизион С-200 (одн С-200))
      - 2nd Fire Division S-200 (2ри огневи дивизион С-200 (одн С-200))
      - Technical Division (технически дивизион (тдн))
    - Missile Air Defence Division (зенитно-ракетен дивизион (зрдн)) (Bankya suburb of Sofia) - S-300PMU SAM
    - Missile Air Defence Division (зенитно-ракетен дивизион (зрдн)) (Samokov) - S-75M "Volhov" SAM
    - Missile Air Defence Division (зенитно-ракетен дивизион (зрдн)) (Yarlovo village near Samokov) - S-75M "Volhov" SAM
    - Missile Air Defence Division (зенитно-ракетен дивизион (зрдн)) (Ihtiman) - S-75M "Volhov" SAM
    - Missile Air Defence Division (зенитно-ракетен дивизион (зрдн)) (Baykal village near Pernik) - S-75M "Volhov" SAM
    - Missile Air Defence Division (зенитно-ракетен дивизион (зрдн)) (Stanke Dimitrov, present day Dupnitsa) - S-125 "Neva" SAM
    - Missile Air Defence Division (зенитно-ракетен дивизион (зрдн)) (Lyulin mountain) - S-125 "Neva" SAM
    - Missile Air Defence Division (зенитно-ракетен дивизион (зрдн)) (Bozhurishte) - S-125 "Neva" SAM
    - Missile Air Defence Division (зенитно-ракетен дивизион (зрдн)) (Musachevo village near Sofia) - S-125 "Neva" SAM
    - Technical Division (технически дивизион (тдн)) (Yana Railway Station village)
    - Technical Division (технически дивизион (тдн)) (Radomir)
  - 2nd Anti-Aircraft Missile Brigade, in Plovdiv, protecting central Bulgaria
    - Brigade Command and Staff (Plovdiv)
    - Missile Air Defence Division (зенитно-ракетен дивизион (зрдн)) (Dimitrovgrad) - S-75M "Volhov" SAM
    - Missile Air Defence Division (зенитно-ракетен дивизион (зрдн)) (Byala Cherkva village) - S-75M "Volhov" SAM
    - Missile Air Defence Division (зенитно-ракетен дивизион (зрдн)) (Trilistnik village) - S-75M "Volhov" SAM
    - Missile Air Defence Division (зенитно-ракетен дивизион (зрдн)) (Haskovo) - SA-75 "Dvina" SAM, converted to S-75M "Volhov" SAM in 1990.
    - Missile Air Defence Division (зенитно-ракетен дивизион (зрдн)) (Yagodovo village) - S-125 "Neva" SAM
    - Missile Air Defence Division (зенитно-ракетен дивизион (зрдн)) (Tsaratsovo village) - S-125 "Neva" SAM
    - Technical Division (технически дивизион (тдн)) (Mavrudovo village, near Krumovo airfield)
  - 1st Radio-technical Brigade, in Bozhurishte

==== 2nd Air Defence Division ====
- 2nd Air Defence Division, in Yambol, protecting the country's Southeast
  - Ravnets Airfield (near Burgas)
    - 17th Fighter Air Regiment (18ти Изтребителен Авиационен Полк (18ти ИАП)) (Ravnets Airfield)
      - 1/17th Fighter Air Squadron, flying MiG-29/UB
    - 53rd Independent Aviation Technical Battalion (53ти Отделен Авио-технически Батальон (53ти ОАТБ))
    - 15th Independent Battalion for Signals and Radio- and Lighting Technical Support (15ти Отделен Батальон за Свръзки и Радиосветотехническо Осигуряване (15ти ОБРСТО))
  - Balchik Airfield (Balchik)
    - 17th Fighter Air Regiment (18ти Изтребителен Авиационен Полк (18ти ИАП)) (Ravnets Airfield)
      - 2/17th Fighter Air Squadron, flying MiG-21PFM/US
    - 45th Independent Aviation Technical Battalion (45ти Отделен Авио-технически Батальон (45ти ОАТБ))
    - 27th Independent Battalion for Signals and Radio- and Lighting Technical Support (27ми Отделен Батальон за Свръзки и Радиосветотехническо Осигуряване (27ми ОБРСТО))
  - 3rd Anti-Aircraft Missile Brigade (3та Зенитно-ракетна Бригада (3та зрбр)), in Burgas, protecting the oil refinery in Burgas, the naval bases in Varna and Burgas, and Eastern Bulgaria
    - Brigade Command and Staff (Burgas)
    - unofficially the Burgas groupment
      - Missile Air Defence Division (зенитно-ракетен дивизион (зрдн)) (Debelt) - S-75M "Volkhov" SAM
      - Missile Air Defence Division (зенитно-ракетен дивизион (зрдн)) (Pchela village, near Elhovo) - SA-75 "Dvina" SAM
      - Missile Air Defence Division (зенитно-ракетен дивизион (зрдн)) (Chernomorec village, near Sozopol) - SA-75 "Dvina" SAM
      - Missile Air Defence Division (зенитно-ракетен дивизион (зрдн)) (Pomorie) - S-125 "Neva" SAM
      - Technical Division (технически дивизион (тдн)) (Rusokastro village, near Burgas)
    - unofficially the Varna groupment
      - Missile Air Defence Division (зенитно-ракетен дивизион (зрдн)) (Vladislavovo, Varna) - SA-75 "Dvina" SAM
      - Missile Air Defence Division (зенитно-ракетен дивизион (зрдн)) (Kamchia village) - SA-75 "Dvina" SAM
      - Missile Air Defence Division (зенитно-ракетен дивизион (зрдн)) (Oborishte village) - SA-75 "Dvina" SAM
      - Missile Air Defence Division (зенитно-ракетен дивизион (зрдн)) (Galata village) - S-125 "Neva" SAM
      - Technical Division (технически дивизион (тдн)) (Lyuben Karavelovo village, near Varna)
  - 10th Radio-technical Regiment, in Yambol

==== 10th Composite Aviation Corps ====
- Headquarters (Щаб на 10ти Смесен Авиационен Корпус (Щаб 10ти САК)), Plovdiv airfield
- Command Post, Plovdiv airfield
- Kolyu Ganchevo Air Base (Stara Zagora)
  - 13th Helicopter Air Regiment of Combat Helicopters (13ти Вертолетен Авиационен Полк - Бойни Вертолети (13ти ВАП - БВ))
    - 1/13th Attack Helicopter Air Squadron, flying Mi-24D
    - 2/13th Attack Helicopter Air Squadron, flying Mi-24D/V
  - 42nd Independent Aviation Technical Battalion (42ри Отделен Авио-технически Батальон (42ри ОАТБ))
  - 21st Independent Battalion for Signals and Radio- and Lighting Technical Support (21ви Отделен Батальон за Свръзки и Радиосветотехническо Осигуряване (21ви ОБРСТО))
- Graf Ignatievo Airfield (near Plovdiv)
  - 19th Fighter Air Regiment (19ти Изтребителен Авиационен Полк (19ти ИАП))
    - 1/19th Fighter Air Squadron, flying MiG-21bis/UM
    - 2/19th Fighter Air Squadron, flying MiG-21bis/UM
  - 39th Independent Aviation Technical Battalion (39ти Отделен Авио-технически Батальон (39ти ОАТБ))
  - 19th Independent Battalion for Signals and Radio- and Lighting Technical Support (19ти Отделен Батальон за Свръзки и Радиосветотехническо Осигуряване (19ти ОБРСТО))
- Uzundzhovo Airfield (near Haskovo)
  - 21st Fighter Air Regiment (21ви Изтребителен Авиационен Полк (21ви ИАП))
    - 1/21st Fighter Air Squadron, flying MiG-21MF/UM
    - 2/21st Fighter Air Squadron, flying MiG-21MF/UM
  - 81st Independent Aviation Technical Battalion (39ти Отделен Авио-технически Батальон (39ти ОАТБ))
  - 21st Independent Battalion for Signals and Radio- and Lighting Technical Support (21ви Отделен Батальон за Свръзки и Радиосветотехническо Осигуряване (21ви ОБРСТО))
- Bezmer Airfield (near Yambol)
  - 22nd Fighter-Bomber Air Regiment (22ри Изтребително-бомбардировъчен Авиационен Полк (22ри ИБАП))
    - 1/22nd Fighter-Bomber Air Squadron, flying Su-25K/UBK
    - 2/22nd Fighter-Bomber Air Squadron, flying Su-25K/UBK
  - ? Independent Aviation Technical Battalion (? Отделен Авио-технически Батальон (? ОАТБ))
  - 22nd Independent Battalion for Signals and Radio- and Lighting Technical Support (22ри Отделен Батальон за Свръзки и Радиосветотехническо Осигуряване (22ри ОБРСТО))
- Cheshnegirovo (Sadovo) Airfield (near Plovdiv)
  - 25th Fighter-Bomber Air Regiment (25ти Изтребително-бомбардировъчен Авиационен Полк (25ти ИБАП))
    - 1/25th Fighter-Bomber Air Squadron, flying MiG-23BN/UB
    - 2/25th Fighter-Bomber Air Squadron, flying MiG-23BN/UB
  - ? Independent Aviation Technical Battalion (? Отделен Авио-технически Батальон (? ОАТБ))
  - 25th Independent Battalion for Signals and Radio- and Lighting Technical Support (25ти Отделен Батальон за Свръзки и Радиосветотехническо Осигуряване (25ти ОБРСТО))
- Tolbukhin Airfield (present day Dobrich)
  - 26th Reconnaissance Air Regiment (26ти Разузнавателен Авиационен Полк (26ти РАП))
    - 1/26th Reconnaissance Air Squadron, flying MiG-21R/F-13 (R)/US
    - 2/26th Reconnaissance Air Squadron, flying Su-22M4, Su-22UM3K
    - Independent Air Flight for Operational Reconnaissance, flying MiG-25RBT, MiG-25RU
  - 30th Independent Aviation Technical Battalion (30ти Отделен Авио-технически Батальон (30ти ОАТБ))
  - 26th Independent Battalion for Signals and Radio- and Lighting Technical Support (26ти Отделен Батальон за Свръзки и Радиосветотехническо Осигуряване (26ти ОБРСТО))
- Krumovo Airfield (Plovdiv IAP)
  - 44th Helicopter Air Regiment (44ти Вертолетен Авиационен Полк (44ти ВАП))
    - 1/44th Helicopter Air Squadron, flying Mi-8T
    - 2/44th Helicopter Air Squadron, flying Mi-17
    - 3/44th Helicopter (Training) Air Squadron, flying Mi-2
  - ? Independent Aviation Technical Battalion (? Отделен Авио-технически Батальон (? ОАТБ))
  - 44th Independent Battalion for Signals and Radio- and Lighting Technical Support (44ти Отделен Батальон за Свръзки и Радиосветотехническо Осигуряване (44ти ОБРСТО))
- Troops Aviation Repair Workshop Graf Ignatievo (Войскова Авиационна Ремонтна Работилница - Граф Игнатиево (ВАРР))
- Troops Aviation Repair Workshop Bezmer (Войскова Авиационна Ремонтна Работилница - Безмер (ВАРР))
- Troops Aviation Missile Repair Workshop (Войскова Авиационна Ремонтна Работилница за Ракети (ВАРРР)) (Graf Ignatievo)
- 10th Signals Regiment (10ти Свързочен Полк), in Plovdiv
- 10th Radio-Technical Battalion, in Plovdiv (supporting the flight activities of the corps' air regiments, with radar posts located at the airfields)

==== People's Higher Air Force School ====
The modern Bulgarian Air Force Training originates from 1955, when by order #182/ 1955 (July 6, 1955) the commander of the People's Higher Air Force School transferred the 1st Combat Training Air Squadron (1ва Учебно-Бойна Авиационна Ескадрила (1. УБАЕ)) with its Yak-11 trainers from Telish Air Base to Kamenets Air Base and transformed it into 2nd Combat Training Air Regiment (2ри Учебно-Боен Авиационен Полк (2. УБАП)) with its 2 Yak-11 squadrons transitioning to Yak-17 and Yak-23. In the following year the air regiment transitioned to MiG-15/MiG-15bis/UMiG-15, and then to MiG-17s in 1963.

In 1967 the 2nd Combat Training Air Regiment split in two separate combat-training air regiments. The 1st Combat Training Air Regiment relocated to Shtraklevo Air Base close to Ruse with two MiG-17 squadrons and a third squadron relocated to Dolna Mitropoliya. The remainder of 2nd Combat Training Air Regiment stayed in Kamenets with two MiG-17 squadrons, retaining its designations. In 1969 the 1st Combat Training Air Regiment (1 CATR) formed a fourth MiG-17 squadron at Dolna Mitropoliya (1st and 2nd at Straklevo, 3rd and 4th at Dolna Mitropoliya AB). In 1971 the 3rd and 4th Squadrons split from the 1st CTAR, becoming 1st and 2nd Squadrons of a newly formed 3rd Combat Training Air Regiment at Dolna Mitropoliya. The replacement of the MiG-17 with Aero L-29 Delfín jet trainers started in 1964 at 2nd CTAR at Kamenets with small numbers used for the training of flight instructors. In 1965 the training of air force cadets on the L-29 started from the 3rd Squadron of 1st CTAR at Dolna Mitropoliya, and continued with the progress in deliveries with the 1st and 2nd Squadrons in Shtraklevo and the newly formed 4th Squadron in Dolna Mitropoliya.

The 2nd CTAR converted its 1st Squadron to MiG-21 in 1984 and its 2nd Squadron to L-39 in 1986.

- People's Higher Air Force School "Georgi Benkovski" (Висше Народно Военновъздушно Училище "Георги Бенковски" (ВНВВУ)) (Dolna Mitropoliya Air Base)
  - Shtraklevo Airfield (near Ruse)
    - 1st Combat Training Air Regiment (1ви Учебно-боен Авиационен Полк (1ви УБАП))
      - 1/1st Training Air Squadron, flying L-29 Delfín
      - 2/1st Training Air Squadron, flying L-29 Delfín
      - 3/1st Training Air Squadron, flying L-29 Delfín
    - 34th Independent Aviation Technical Battalion (34ти Отделен Авио-технически Батальон (34ти ОАТБ))
    - 12th Independent Battalion for Signals and Radio- and Lighting Technical Support (12ти Отделен Батальон за Свръзки и Радиосветотехническо Осигуряване (12ти ОБРСТО))
  - Kamenets Airfield (near Pleven)
    - 2nd Combat Training Air Regiment (2ри Учебно-боен Авиационен Полк (2ри УБАП))
      - 1/2nd Training Air Squadron, flying MiG-21PFM/UM
      - 2/2nd Training Air Squadron, flying L-39ZA Albatros
    - ? Independent Aviation Technical Battalion (? Отделен Авио-технически Батальон (? ОАТБ))
    - ? Independent Battalion for Signals and Radio- and Lighting Technical Support (? Отделен Батальон за Свръзки и Радиосветотехническо Осигуряване (? ОБРСТО))
  - Dolna Mitropoliya Airfield (near Pleven)
    - 3rd Independent Training Air Squadron (3та Отделна Учебна Авиационна Ескадрила (3та ОУАЕ)), flying L-29 Delfín
    - 49th Independent Aviation Technical Battalion (49ти Отделен Авио-технически Батальон (49ти ОАТБ))
    - 4th Independent Battalion for Signals and Radio- and Lighting Technical Support (4ти Отделен Батальон за Свръзки и Радиосветотехническо Осигуряване (4ти ОБРСТО))
  - Troops Aviation Repair Workshop Dolna Mitropoliya (Войскова Авиационна Ремонтна Работилница - Долна Митрополия (ВАРР))

==== Air Force and Air Defence Forces Equipment ====
In 1989 the air force's inventory consisted of:

- 51x MiG-21PFM interceptors, 35x MiG-21MF and 36x MiG-21bis fighters, 33x MiG-21UM two-seat trainers, 6x MiG-21R and 11 obsolete MiG-21F-13(R) reconnaissance aircraft
- 18x Su-22M4, 3x Su-22UM3K
- 7x MiG-23MF, 11x MiG-23ML/MLA and 15x MiG-23MLD fighters, 33x MiG-23BN attack aircraft, 15x MiG-23UB two-seat trainers (8x MiG-23s lost in accidents until 1989)
- 2x MiG-25RBT ELINT-reconnaissance aircraft, 1x MiG-25RU two-seat trainer (single seaters nr. 731 and 754 (a third single-seater nr. 736 lost in 1984), twin seater nr. 51, the three remaining aircraft exchanged with the Soviet Union in 1990 for 5 second hand Mikoyan-Gurevich MiG-23MLD)
- 32x Su-25K attack aircraft, 3x Su-25UBK two-seat trainers
- 12x MiG-29A fighters, 4x MiG-29UB two-seat trainers
- 38x Mi-24D and 6x Mi-24V attack helicopters
- 20x Mi-17 transport helicopters (of them 4 PP variant for EW)
- around 84 L-29 Delfín two-seat trainers
- at 18x L-39ZA Albatros two-seat trainers (another 18 delivered in 1990)
- a further 36x MiG-21bis fighters were delivered in 1990 from Soviet Air Force stocks, 18 each for the conversion of the fighter squadrons in Balchik and Uzundzhovo.
- 14x Mi-2 and 7x Mi-8 helicopters
- 3x An-2, 3x An-24, 5x An-26, 1x An-30, 1x Yak-40, 2x Tu-134, 5x Let L-410UVP-E (of them 1 in photo variant) passenger and transport planes.

The three anti-aircraft missile brigades were equipped with the following air defence systems:

- 20x S-75M Volkhov high-altitude air defence systems
- 30x S-125 Pechora mobile air defence systems
- 25x S-200 Vega long range air defence systems
- 10x S-300 air defence systems

=== People's Navy ===
Adhering to the Soviet military traditions the navy of the Bulgarian People's Army was called the Military Naval Fleet (Военноморски флот (ВМФ)). The merchant marine, which was to mobilize in wartime in support of the regular navy was called Bulgarian Sea Fleet (Български Морски Флот (БМФ)).

- Naval Fleet Staff, in Varna
  - Electronic Warfare Section (Отделение РЕБ)
    - Independent Electronic Warfare Battalion type "NS" (Отделен батальон тип "НС") (one company type N for jamming of enemy communications and one company type S for jamming of enemy targeting systems)
  - 8th Submarine Division, Varna Naval Base, with 4x Romeo-class submarines (Two were decommissioned without replacement in 1990, one in 1992)
    - 81 "Victory" ("Победа", delivered in 1972, former Soviet S-57), 82 "Victoria" ("Виктория", delivered in 1972, former Soviet S-212), 83 "Hope" ("Надежда", delivered in 1983, former Soviet S-36), 84 "Glory" ("Слава", delivered in 1985, former Soviet S-38) (traditional female names)
  - 2nd Coastal Missile Brigade, south of Varna, with 4K51 Rubezh anti-ship missiles
  - 10th Missile & Torpedo Boat Brigade, in Sozopol (mixed composition of the divisions, the torpedo boats had the dual role to attack enemy vessels with their torpedoes and to provide target acquisition for the missile boats)
    - 122 (Commander's cutter, 10-ton Soviet project 371)
    - 10th Missile & Torpedo Boat Division
      - missile boats Project 205: 101 "Lightning" ("Светкавица", delivered in 1982, former Soviet R-496, improved project 205U); 102 "Hurricane" ("Ураган", delivered in 1977, former Soviet R-169, improved project 205U); 103 "Storm" ("Буря", delivered in 1971, former Soviet R-176?, basic project 205)
      - torpedo boats Project 206: 104 "Eagle" ("Орел"), 105 "Hawk" ("Ястреб"), 106 "Albatross" ("Албатрос")
    - 11th Missile & Torpedo Boat Division
      - missile boats Project 205: 111 "Typhoon" ("Тайфун", delivered in 1982, former Soviet R-496, improved project 205U); 112 "Thunder" ("Гръм", delivered in 1977, former Soviet R-169, improved project 205U); 113 "Whirlwind" ("Смерч", delivered in 1971, former Soviet R-176?, basic project 205)
      - torpedo boats Project 206: 114 "Snow leopard" ("Барс"), 115 "Jaguar" ("Ягуар"), 116 "Panther" ("Пантера")
    - Coastal Base Sozopol (Брегова База Созопол, the brigade's logistic formation)
      - 274 (fireboat project 364 of Soviet build)
  - 25th Signals Regiment, in Varna
  - 63rd Anti-submarine Helicopter Squadron, at Chayka (Bulgarian for "seagull") Independent Naval Helicopter Base in Varna (in the Chayka suburb), flying 8x Mi-14PL anti-submarine helicopters (nr. 801, and nr. 810 of the original ten were lost), 1 x Mi-14BT (nr. 811; nr. 812 had been retired in 1986 and the minesweeping equipment removed from 811. Afterwards nr. 811 was used for transport tasks) and 1 x Ka-25C (Hormone-B, nr. 821, used for OTH targeting of the shore-based AShM systems).
  - 65th Maritime Special Reconnaissance Detachment (65-ти Морски Специален Разузннавателен Отряд (65ти МСРО)), in Varna (Tihina) (Navy frogmen)
  - 130mm Coastal Artillery Training Battery, in Varna (in wartime the navy would mobilize the 1st (Varna) and 2nd (Burgas) Coastal Artillery Regiments with 5 batteries each)
  - People's Higher Naval School "Nikola Vaptsarov", in Varna
  - 44th Surveillance and Signals Battalion - Danube River, in Ruse (44-ти батальон за наблюдение и свръзки - река Дунав) (Radar and SIGINT)
  - Rear (Тил) (logistic services)

==== Varna Naval Base ====
- Varna Naval Base, in Varna
  - 2 commander's cutters of project 371
  - 1st Anti-Submarine Ships Division
    - Riga-class frigates: 11 "Bold" ("Дръзки", delivered in 1957, former Soviet Black Sea Fleet SKR-67), 12 "Brave" ("Смели", delivered in 1958, former Black Sea Fleet SKR-53, replaced on Sept 4 1989 by the Koni-class frigate 11 "Brave", this caused renumbering of the Riga-class ships, but they were retired only a year later), 13 "Cheerful" ("Бодри", delivered in 1985, former Soviet Baltic Fleet SKR "Kobchik") (note that "Bold", "Brave" and "Cheerful" are adjectives in plural)
    - Poti-class small ASW ships: 14 "Brave" ("Храбри", delivered in 1975, former Soviet MPK-106), 15 "Fearless" ("Безстрашни", delivered in 1975, former Soviet MPK-125) (note that "Brave" and "Fearless" are adjectives in plural)
  - 3rd Minesweepers Division
    - 31 "Iskar" ("Искър"), 32 "Tsibar" ("Цибър"), 33 "Dobrotich" ("Добротич"), 34 "Captain-Lieutenant Kiril Minkov" ("Капитан-лейтенант Кирил Минков"), 35 "Captain-Lieutenant Evstati Vinarov" ("Капитан-лейтенант Евстати Винаров"), 36 "Captain I Rank Dimitar Paskalev" ("Капитан I-ви ранг Димитър Паскалев") (minehunters project 257D/DME, Soviet second hand, NATO reporting name Vanya)
  - 5th Minesweepers Division (Coastal Base Balchik)
    - 51 - 56 (minehunters of project 1259.2 project "Malachite", NATO reporting name Olya, built in Michurin), 2 auxiliary cutters of project 501 (former auxiliary minesweeping boats) and a commander's cutter of project 371
  - 18th Independent Division of Special Purpose Ships (former 18th Harbour Area Security Ships, includes supply, rescue and support ships and small patrol craft)
    - 300 "General Vladimir Zaimov" ("Генерал Владимир Заимов") (Command ship Bulgarian project 589, built in Ruse, also used for SIGINT of the Turkish Navy)
    - 221 "Jupiter" ("Юпитер") (East German fire-/ tugboat project 700, used as fireboat, salvage tugboat, submarine rescue ship and target tow for the coastal artillery and ships)
    - 401 "Admiral Branimir Ormanov" ("Адмирал Бранимир Орманов") (Polish project 861-МВ hydrographic ship, built in 1977)
    - 206 "Captain I Rank Dimitar Dobrev" ("Капитан І ранг Димитър Добрев") (Polish project 1799 (class 130 for the Soviet Navy) degaussing ship, built in 1988, the modern Polish Navy ship ORP Kontradmirał Xawery Czernicki is a development on the same hull type)
    - 311 "Anton Ivanov", later "Mitsar" and "Anlain" ("Антон Иванов", "Мицар", "Анлайн", Auxiliary transport (replenishment) ship Bulgarian project 102, built in Ruse in 1979, main task was to provide en route replenishment for the Bulgarian ships, committed to the Soviet Navy Operational Mediterranean Squadron)
    - 223 (diving support boat Bulgarian project 245, built in Varna in 1980)
    - 121, 215 and 216 (multirole motor cutters Bulgarian project 160, built in Varna)
    - 1 fireboat type L26, pennant number changed several times (built in Rostock, GDR in 1954–55)
    - 218 and 219 (auxiliary cutters, former minesweeping boats type R376 "Sever")
  - 55th Surveillance and Signals Battalion (55-ти батальон за наблюдение и свръзки) (Radar and SIGINT)
  - Repair Workshop
  - Shore based support units

==== Atia Naval Base ====
- Atia Naval Base, east of Burgas (in the 1970s the Burgas Naval Base relocated to Atia with the corresponding change in name)
  - 2 commander's cutters of project 371
  - 4th Small Anti-Submarine Ships Division
    - Poti-class small ASW ships: 41 "Flying" ("Летящи", delivered in 1982, former Soviet MPK-77), 42 "Vigilant" ("Бдителни", delivered in 1982, former Soviet MPK-148), 43 "Persistent" ("Напористи", delivered in 1982, former Soviet MPK-109), 44 "Stern (Rigorous)" ("Строги", delivered in 1975 to Varna, transferred in 1982 to Burgas, former Soviet MPK-59) (note that "Flying", "Vigilant", "Persistent" and "Rigorous" are adjectives in plural)
  - 6th Minesweepers Division
    - 61 "Breeze" ("Бриз"), 62 "Squall" ("Шквал"), 63 "Surf" ("Прибой"), 64 "Storm" ("Щорм") (minehunters project 1265 "Yakhont")
    - 65, 66, 67, 68 (minesweepers project 1258E "Korund", NATO reporting name Yevgenya)
  - 7th Landing Ships Division
    - 701 "Sirius" ("Сириус") and 702 "Antares" ("Антарес") (Polish project 770Е medium tank landing ships, NATO reporting name Polnocny)
    - 703 - 712 (Soviet project 106K small tank landing ship and auxiliary minelayers, practically self-propelled landing barges, built in Ruse and Burgas, NATO reporting name Vydra)
    - (another 14 project 106K small tank landing ships and auxiliary minelayers mothballed after construction and stored by Bulgarian Sea Fleet (the state-owned merchant marine) as wartime mobilization stock)
  - 96th Independent Division of Special Purpose Ships (former 96th Harbour Area Security Ships, includes supply, rescue and support ships and small patrol craft)
    - 301 "Captain Kiril Halachev" ("Капитан Кирил Халачев") (Command ship Bulgarian project 589, built in Ruse)
    - 302 "Bolshevik" ("Болшевик", Auxiliary transport (replenishment) ship Bulgarian project 102, built in Ruse in 1987, main task was to provide en route replenishment for the Bulgarian ships, committed to the Soviet Navy Operational Mediterranean Squadron)
    - 323 (diving support boat Bulgarian project 245, built in Varna in 1980)
    - 331 (torpedo salvage boat Bulgarian project 205, built in Varna in 1980)
    - 312 and 313 (multirole motor cutters Bulgarian project 160, built in Varna)
    - 1 fireboat type L26, pennant number changed several times (built in Rostock, GDR in 1954–55)
    - 57 and 58 (auxiliary cutters, former minesweeping boats type R376 "Sever")
  - 66th Surveillance and Signals Battalion (66-ти батальон за наблюдение и свръзки) (Radar and SIGINT)
  - Coastal Radiolocation Station "Periscope I" (ELINT unit)
  - Repair Workshop
  - Shore based support units

==== Naval Equipment ====
In 1989 the people's navy's inventory consisted of:

- 4x Romeo-class submarines
- 3x Riga-class frigates (One decommissioned in 1989, two in 1990)
- 1x Koni-class frigate (Commissioned in December 1989)
- 6x Poti-class anti-submarine warfare corvettes
- 1x Pauk-class corvette (Commissioned in 1989, a second Pauk corvette was transferred from the Soviet Union in 1990)
- 6x Osa-class missile boats
- 6x Shershen-class torpedo boats
- 2x Polnocny-class landing ships
- 6x Vanya-class minesweepers
- 4x Yevgenya-class minesweepers
- 4x Sonya-class minesweepers
- 6x Olya-class minesweepers
- 34x R376 type "Yaroslavets" axillary cutters in various configurations

=== Construction Troops ===
The Construction Troops (Bulgarian: Строителни войски) were a military service tasked with labour work for the development of the country. Made up mostly of men from minorities and men deemed unreliable for service ("considered unfit") in the armed forces the construction troops were organized in seven Construction Divisions: three based in Sofia and one each in Plovdiv, Stara Zagora, Varna and Pleven.

Main Directorate of the Construction Troops (Главно управление на Строителните Войски)

- Command (Командване)
  - Chief of the Main Directorate of the Construction Troops (Началник на Главно управление на СВ)
  - First Deputy-Chief and Chief of the Political Department (Зам.-началник на СВ, той е и началник на Политическо управление на СВ)
  - Deputy-Chief of the Construction Troops in Charge of the Construction Troops (Зам.-началник на СВ по строителството)
  - Deputy-Chief of the Construction Troops in Charge of the Rear (logistics) (Зам.-началник на СВ, той е и началник тил на СВ)
  - Deputy-Chief of the Construction Troops in Charge of the Economical Matters (Зам.-началник на СВ по икономическите въпроси)
- Staff (Щаб)
- Independent Departments and Branches of the MDCT (Самостоятелни управления и отдели в ГУСВ)
- Operational Formations:
  - 1st Construction Mechanized Division (1ва Строителна Механизирана Дивизия (1. СМД)) (Sukhodol, Sofia)
    - Command; Staff; Supply Company (Sukhodol, Sofia)
    - Training Battalion (Учебен Батальон) (Golemo Buchino, Pernik Province)
    - Special Battalion (Специален Батальон, for pre-production of building elements) (Sukhodol, Sofia; Pernik and Stanke Dimitrov)
    - 1st Construction Regiment (1. Строителен Полк) (Botevgrad) (battalion and platoon in Botevgrad; battalion in Pravets)
    - 2nd Construction Regiment (2. Строителен Полк) (Kyustendil) (battalion in Kyustendil; cadred battalions in Bobov Dol and Stanke Dimitrov, cadred platoon in Tran)
    - 3rd Construction Regiment (3. Строителен Полк) (Pernik) (companies and platoons in Pernik, Samokov and the villages around them; cadred battalion in Bornaevo)
    - 4th Construction Regiment (4. Строителен Полк) (Blagoevgrad) (battalions in Blagoevgrad, Sukhodol, Sofia, Petrich, Ilindentsi, cadred companies in Gotse Delchev and at the "Belmeken-Sestrimo" water supply cascade and a platoon at the Rila Monastery)
    - Automobile Machinery Regiment - Sofia (Автомашинен Полк - София) (Sukhodol, Sofia; Blagoevgrad, Pernik, Kyustendil, Samokov and Botevgrad)
  - 5th Construction Mechanized Division (5та Строителна Механизирана Дивизия (5. СМД)) (Pleven)
    - Command; Staff; Supply Company and Training Battalion (Pleven)
    - 1st Construction Regiment (1. Строителен Полк) (Roman) (5 battalions and a company in Roman)
    - 2nd Construction Regiment (2. Строителен Полк) (Yasen) (battalion in Yasen, companies in Pleven, Lovech, Yasen and Zlatna Panega)
    - 3rd Construction Regiment (3. Строителен Полк) (Vratsa) (companies and Vratsa, Vidin, Kozloduy and Slatina, platoon in Boychinovtsi)
    - 4th Construction Regiment (4. Строителен Полк) (Veliko Tarnovo) (two battalions in Veliko Tarnovo, platoon in Svishtov)
    - 5th Construction Regiment (5. Строителен Полк) (Gabrovo) (two battalions and three companies in Gabrovo and the nearby villages)
    - Automobile Machinery Regiment - Pleven (Автомашинен Полк - Плевен) (Yasen) (cadred battalions in Yasen, Roman and Veliko Tarnovo, cadred companies in Yasen and Vratsa)
  - 6th Construction Mechanized Division (6та Строителна Механизирана Дивизия (6. СМД)) (Plovdiv)
    - Command; Staff; Supply Company and Training Battalion in Plovdiv, a platoon in Koprivshtitsa
    - 1st Construction Regiment (1. Строителен Полк) (Sopot) (battalions in Sopot, Kalofer and Karnare, platoon in Klisura)
    - 2nd Construction Regiment (2. Строителен Полк) (Panagyurishte) (battalion and company in Panagyurishte, battalion in Elshitsa and a platoon at the Copper Refinery Complex "Medet")
    - 3rd Construction Regiment (3. Строителен Полк) (Smolyan) (battalions in Smolyan and Kardzhali, companies in Pamporovo, Madan and Smilyan)
    - 4th Construction Regiment (4. Строителен Полк) (Plovdiv) (battalion in Plovdiv, companies in Svilengrad, Peshtera and Hisar, platoons in Parvomai and Laki)
    - Independent Construction Battalion (Velingrad) (7 platoons in Velingrad, platoon in Tsvetino and platoon in Yadenitsa)
    - Automobile Machinery Regiment - Plovdiv (5. Автомашинен Полк - Пловдив) (Plovdiv) (companies in Plovdiv, Smolyan, Sopot and Panagyurishte, platoons in Plovdiv and Velingrad)
    - Divisionary Special Company (blacksmith workshop) (Plovdiv)
  - 13th Construction Mechanized Division (13та Строителна Механизирана Дивизия (13. СМД)) (Varna)
    - Command; Staff; Supply Company and Training Battalion (Varna)
    - 1st Construction Regiment (1. Строителен Полк) (Devnya) (two battalions in Devnya, battalion in Kipra)
    - 2nd Construction Regiment (2. Строителен Полк) (Varna) (battalion and two companies in Varna, battalion in Novi Pazar)
    - 3rd Construction Regiment (3. Строителен Полк) (Shumen) (battalion in Shumen, battalion and two companies in Matnitsa)
    - 4th Construction Regiment (4. Строителен Полк) (Devnya)
    - 5th Construction Regiment (5. Строителен Полк) (Smyadovo)
    - Independent Service Regiment - Varna (Отделен Полк – Услуга – Варна) (Varna)
    - Independent Service Regiment - Devnya (Батальон – Услуга – Девня) (Devnya)
    - Independent Service Battalion - Ruse (Батальон – Услуга – Русе) (Ruse)
    - Automobile Machinery Regiment - Varna (Автомашинен Полк - Варна) (Varna) (battalions in Varna, Shumen and Devnya, companies in Varna and Smyadovo)
    - Disciplinary Rehabilitation Battalion (Дисциплинарен изправителен батальон) (Chernevo)
  - 18th Construction Mechanized Division (18та Строителна Механизирана Дивизия (18. СМД)) (Stara Zagora)
    - Command; Staff; Supply Company and Training Battalion (Stara Zagora)
    - 1st Construction Regiment (1. Строителен Полк) (Sliven) (two battalions in Sliven, battalion in Bratya Kunchevi)
    - 2nd Construction Regiment (2. Строителен Полк) (Burgas) (battalion in Burgas, companies in Primorsko and Malko Tarnovo, platoons in Sarafovo, Grudovo and Vlas)
    - 3rd Construction Regiment (3. Строителен Полк) (Kazanlak) (battalion in Kazanlak, battalion in Sheynovo and a battalion at the Buzludzha)
    - 4th Construction Regiment (4. Строителен Полк) (Yambol) (battalion and company in Yambol, battalion in Elhovo)
    - 5th Construction Regiment (5. Строителен Полк) (Radnevo) (battalion in Mednikarevo, companies in Radnevo, Stara Zagora and Yabalkovo and a service company in Troyanovo)
    - Divisionary Service Company - Stara Zagora (Дивизионна Рота – Услуга – Стара Загора) (Stara Zagora)
    - Special Battalion - Stara Zagora (Специален батальон – Стара Загора) (Stara Zagora)
    - Automobile Machinery Regiment - Stara Zagora (Автомашинен Полк - Стара Загора) (Stara Zagora) (battalions in Sliven, Kazanlak and Radnevo, companies in Burgas and Yambol)
    - Disciplinary Rehabilitation Battalion (Дисциплинарен изправителен батальон) (Mednikarevo)
  - 20th Construction Mechanized Division (20та Строителна Механизирана Дивизия (20. СМД)) (Gorublyane, Sofia)
    - Command; Staff; Supply Company (Gorublyane, Sofia) and Training Battalion (Chelopechene)
    - 1st Construction Regiment (1. Строителен Полк) (Busmantsi) (battalion and company in Busmantsi, battalion in Bukhovo, platoon in Zhivkovo)
    - 2nd Construction Regiment (2. Строителен Полк) (Darvenitsa, Sofia) (three battalions and a company in Darvenitsa)
    - 3rd Construction Regiment (3. Строителен Полк МОК "Елаците") (Ravna Reka) (3 battalions at the Mining Refining Complex "Elatsite")
    - 4th Construction Regiment (4. Строителен Полк) (Chelopech) (two battalions in Chelopech, company in Mirkovo)
    - Special Regiment (Специален полк) (Busmantsi) (two battalions and a company in Busmantsi)
    - Special Regiment (Специален полк) (Chelopechene) (company and platoon in Chelopechene, company in Chelopech)
    - 1st Service Regiment (1. Полк – Услуга) (Bukhovo)
    - 2nd Service Regiment (2. Полк – Услуга) (Sofia)
    - Automobile Machinery Company (Автомашинна Рота) (Chelopechene)
  - 25th Construction Mechanized Division (25. Строителна Механизирана Дивизия) (Sofia) (housing construction)
    - Command; Staff; Supply Company; Training Battalion (Sofia)
    - 1st Construction Regiment (1. Строителен Полк) (Zemlyane, Sofia)
    - 2nd Construction Regiment (2. Строителен Полк) (Obelya, Sofia)
    - 3rd Construction Regiment (3. Строителен Полк) (Boyana - the National Cinema Center, Sofia)
    - 4th Construction Regiment (4. Строителен Полк) (Obelya, Sofia)
    - Special High Construction Battalion (Специален Батальон Батальон за Работа по Високи Обекти) (Zemlyane, Sofia)
    - Automobile Machinery Regiment - Obelya (Автомашинен Полк - Обеля) (Obelya, Sofia)
    - Service Company (Осигурителна Рота) (Lagera, Sofia)
  - Electrical Machinery and Installation Brigade (Електромашинна и монтажна бригада) (Sofia)
    - Command; Staff; Supply Platoon; Heavy Transportation and Mechanization Company (Sofia)
    - 1st Installation Regiment (1. Монтажен Полк) (Sofia)
      - Independent Installation Platoon (Самостоятелен Монтажен Взвод) (Chelopech)
      - 1st Installation Battalion (1. Монтажен Батальон) (Sofia)
      - 2nd Installation Battalion (2. Монтажен Батальон) (Blagoevgrad)
    - 2nd Installation Regiment (2. Монтажен Полк) (Plovdiv)
      - 1st Installation Battalion (1. Монтажен Батальон) (Smolyan)
      - 2nd Installation Battalion (2. Монтажен Батальон) (Sopot)
      - 3rd Installation Battalion (2. Монтажен Батальон) (Sliven)
    - 3rd Installation Regiment (3. Монтажен Полк) (Varna)
      - 1st Installation Battalion (1. Монтажен Батальон) (Devnya)
      - 2nd Installation Battalion (2. Монтажен Батальон) (Shumen)
  - 9th Construction Mechanization Brigade (9. Бригада за строителна механизация) (Chelopechene, Sofia)
    - Command; Staff; Supply Platoon; Construction Platoon (Chelopechene, Sofia)
    - Lift Transport Battalion (Самостоятелен Подемно-транспортен Батальон) (Chelopechene, Sofia)
    - Automobile Machinery Battalion (Самостоятелен Автомашинен Батальон) (Iskar Railway Station)
    - Automobile Machinery Battalion (Самостоятелен Автомашинен Батальон) (Chelopech)
    - Building Materials Mixtures Regiment (Полк за строителни разтвори) (Chelopechene) (concrete mixing trucks)
    - Combined Repair Workshop (Обединена ремонтна работилница) (Chelopechene)
- Support Institutions:
  - Complex Institute for Scientific Research, Development, Project and Implementation Activities of the Construction Troops (Комплексен Институт за Научноизследователска, Развойна, Проектантска и Внедрителска Дейност на Строителни Войски (КИНИРПВД – СВ)) (Sofia)
    - Direction (Направление Научно-изследователска и Развойна Дейност)
    - Direction Laboratories, Experimentation and Implementation (Направление Лаборатории, Експериментиране и Внедряване)
    - Direction Projects (Направление Проектиране)
  - Higher People's Military School for Construction "General Blagoi Ivanov" (Висше Народно Военно Строително Училище (ВНВСУ) "Ген. Благой Иванов") (Sofia) - trained career Construction Troops officers
    - Intermediate Military Construction Sergeant School (Средно сержантско военно строително училище (ССВСУ))
  - School for Installation Cadres (Школа за монтажни кадри) (Burgas)

== Ministry of Interior ==
=== Border Troops ===
The Border Troops (Гранични войски) were a paramilitary formation under the Ministry of Interior tasked with guarding Bulgaria's borders. Heavily concentrated on Bulgaria's iron curtain border with NATO members Greece and Turkey the Border Troops would have come under the Ministry of People's Defence in times of war. After the Cold War the border troops were reformed as Border Police.

Until 1946 the Bulgarian border guard was a task of the regular army and each infantry regiment in proximity of the border had a border guard company. In 1946 the new Communist regime formed an independent service, dedicated to the border security on August 10, 1946, as the Border Militsiya, but this name lasted only until October 8, when it was renamed to Border Troops. The service initially numbered 8 Border Sectors (Гранични сектори (ГС)). The service was modeled on the Soviet Border Troops. Unlike them the Bulgarian Border Troops were not part of the State Security service, but subordinated to the Ministry of the Interior (between 1962 and 1972 to the Ministry of People's Defence). The internal structure of the troops was overhauled with ministerial order #44 from March 9, 1950, as follows:

- the highest formations (the Border Sectors) were renamed into Border Detachments (Гранични Отряди (ГО), an equivalent of a motorised rifle regiment in the army, but with a smaller manpower, and increased from 8 to 10)
- the battalion equivalents were renamed from Border Sections to Border Commandatures (Гранични Комендатури (ГК))
- the company equivalents were renamed from Border Subsections to Border Outposts (Гранични Застави (ГЗ))

As a military formation each Border Detachment had its Command, Staff and supporting units. The number of the detachments varied through the Communist Era from 8 sectors at the formation of the Border Troops, to 10 in 1950 and 17 at the height of the service's build-up, to 12 in 1989, of which 1 was a training formation. The organization of the Border Troops, as published by the Committee for Disclosing the Documents and Announcing Affiliation of Bulgarian Citizens to the State Security and Intelligence Services of the Bulgarian People's Army (A public commission, authorised by law of the Parliament to study the repressive apparatus of the Communist regime and to establish the connection of individuals to it) in a collection book of declassified documents, was as follows:

Directorate of the Border Troops (Управление на Гранични войски (УГВ))

- Headquarters (Щаб, with 11 departments, such as Operations; Combat Training; Communications; Engineering etc.)
- Intelligence Section (Разузнавателно отделение (РО))
  - Intelligence Desk (Разузнаване (Р))
  - Counter-Intelligence Desk (Контраразузнаване (К))
- Political Section (Политическо отделение (ПО), with 8 departments, such as Political Education; Editorial of the Border Troops official magazine; Technical Editorial; Library etc.)
- Rear (Тил, logistical services, 5 departments)
- Training Border Detachment (Учебен Граничен Отряд (УГО)) (Ivaylovgrad, former 18th Border Detachment)
- Sergeant School for Working Dog Handlers (Сержантска школа за инструктори на служебни кучета (СШИСК) (Berkovitsa)
- Supply and Support Battalion (Батальон за Обслужване и Осигуряване (БОО))
- Border Detachments:
  - 1st Border Detachment - Vidin (1ви Граничен Отряд – Видин (1 ГО))
    - including a Border Ships Division (Дивизион Гранични Кораби) for patrols on the Danube river
  - 2nd Border Detachment - Dragoman (2ри Граничен Отряд – Драгоман (2 ГО))
  - 11th Border Detachment - Kyustendil (11ти Граничен Отряд – Кюстендил (11 ГО))
  - 3rd Border Detachment - Petrich (3ти Граничен Отряд – Петрич (3 ГО))
  - 6th Border Detachment - Gotse Delchev (6ти Граничен Отряд – Гоце Делчев (16 ГО))
  - 4th Border Detachment - Smolyan (4ти Граничен Отряд – Смолян (4 ГО))
  - 5th Border Detachment - Momchilgrad (5ти Граничен Отряд – Момчилград (5 ГО))
  - 13th Border Detachment - Lyubimets (13ти Граничен Отряд – Любимец (13 ГО))
  - 6th Border Detachment - Elhovo (6ти Граничен Отряд – Елхово (6 ГО))
  - 7th Border Detachment - Malko Tarnovo (7ми Граничен Отряд – Малко Търново (7 ГО))
  - 8th Border Detachment - Burgas (8ми Граничен Отряд – Бургас (8 ГО))
    - including a Border Ships Division (Дивизион Гранични Кораби) for patrols on the Bulgarian Black Sea coastline

The border guards were conscripts, which underwent their training at the border detachment they were assigned to. After that those, who have displayed higher skills in the training process were sent to the Training Border Detachment for an NCO course. Of them small numbers were selected for training as working dog handlers at the K-9 Sergeant School. The officer candidates of the Border Troops studied at the Ground Forces Combined Arms Higher School in Veliko Tarnovo and the career development of Border Troops officers was carried out through courses at the Military Academy in Sofia and training institutes of the Soviet Border Troops in the Soviet Union.

=== Interior Troops ===
The Interior Troops (Bulgarian: Вътрешни Войски (ВВ)) did not exist throughout the whole period of Communist rule in Bulgaria. They were formed during two distinct periods in the presence of a significant organized paramilitary force in opposition to the regime. The first such threat was the Goryani movement. In a report to the Central Committee of the Bulgarian Communist Party dated from October 12, 1948, the at the time Minister of the Interior Anton Yugov informs that for combating the anti-communist partisans 13 special combat units with 1 350 men in total have been formed. He brings to the attention of the committee, that due to their composition of regular Militsioners, family men in their mid-30s and older, a rising tension and physical strain has been observed because of the long periods of patrolling and fighting in the mountains where the Goryanes were active. For that reason Yugov suggests that a specialized Interior Troops arm should be formed in order to facilitate the utilization of conscripts for the Ministry of the Interior with the same conditions of military service as the conscripts of the Bulgarian Army, but trained in the specific counter-insurgency skills needed for such operations. In his report the minister suggests that initially about 1 000 conscripts should be trained by the 13 special combat units in order to relieve their personnel, after which additional 3 000 should be inducted to boost their numbers, with the corresponding reduction in manpower of the regular Militsiya by 3 000 men. Later the numbers of the IT increased to a division and even after the Goryani movement was destroyed their build-up continued to over 12 000 in two divisions and two specialized brigades with their own tanks, artillery, AAA, combat engineers etc., before their abrupt disbandment in 1961.

The second installment of the Bulgarian Interior Troops is from 1985 in connection to the Revival Process. A wave of terror attacks in the first half of the 1980s, including a bomb attack on a special passenger train coach for mothers traveling with little children on March 9, 1985, at Bunovo railway station, organized by the Turkish National-Liberation Movement terror organization, called for the re-establishment of a dedicated counter-insurgency paramilitary force in the structure of the Ministry of the Interior, to deal with the internal terror threat in cooperation with the State Security (Държавна Сигурност (ДС)) and the People's Militsiya (Народна Милиция (НМ)). The Interior Troops were tasked with counter-insurgency in mountainous and woodland terrain, riot control and security of locations of particular and strategic importance. The force was reinstated in 1985 and at the Boyana Roundtable Conference in the first half of 1990 convened between the Bulgarian Communist Party (recently renamed to Bulgarian Socialist Party) and the Union of Democratic Forces to reach an agreement about the reform of the country in light of radical changes in Eastern Europe it was publicly made clear (in response to a question), that the Interior Troops number 2 000 men in 6 battalions, plus the SOBT. The latter however is incorrect. The Specialized Counter-Terrorism Force (abbreviated SOBT in Bulgarian) has from its formation to present day (2025) been the premier counter-terrorism unit of the country, strategically subordinated directly to the Minister of the Interior as an independent agency in its own right. The confusion comes from the fact, that a security regiment of the IT has been based in Vranya, near the former Vrana Palace in barracks recently vacated by the State Security's Fifth Department (Department for Safety and Protection) (Пето управление (Управление за безопасност и охрана (УБО)), the higher state functionaries' close protection service. Since the abolition of the Bulgarian monarchy the palace has been turned into an official residence with permanent presence from the Ministry of the Interior. The battalion in question was the quick reaction paramilitary force for the capital Sofia. In fact the Vranya Battalion and the SOBT are located in adjacent barracks, which causes the confusion. The Interior Troops battalions were organised as rifle battalions with BTR-60s, trucks, automatic rifles, machine guns, mortars and anti-tank rockets. In 1990-91 the Border and the Interior Troops were amalgamated into the Troops of the Ministry of the Interior (Войски на МВР), then separated again. In 1993 the Interior Troops were renamed into Gendarmery, the traditional name from the time of the monarchy, banned after that for their role in hunting down communist partizans. Recently the Gendarmery has been absorbed into the Ministry of the Interior's Main Directorate "National Police" and as of 2017 the former Interior Troops and Gendarmery after that exist in the form of Specialized Police Forces (Специализирани Полицейски Сили) within the National Police. In 1989 they consisted of:

- Interior Troops Directorate (Управление "Вътрешни войски") (Sofia) (Detachment 72300)
  - 1st Independent Operational Security Regiment (1ви Самостоятелен Оперативно-охранителен Полк) (Vrana Palace, Sofia) (Detachment 72345 (44270 before the establishment of the IT))
  - 1st Independent Operational Battalion (1ви Самостоятелен Оперативен Батальон) (Kardzhali) (Detachment 72350)
  - 2nd Independent Operational Battalion (2ри Самостоятелен Оперативен Батальон) (Razgrad) (Detachment 72355)
  - 3rd Independent Operational Battalion (3ти Самостоятелен Оперативен Батальон) (Dzhebel) (Detachment 72360)
  - 4th Independent Operational Battalion (4ти Самостоятелен Оперативен Батальон) (Novi Pazar) (Detachment 72365)
  - 5th Independent Operational Battalion (5ти Самостоятелен Оперативен Батальон) (Brezovo) (Detachment 72370)
  - 6th Independent Operational Battalion (6ти Самостоятелен Оперативен Батальон) (Burgas) (Detachment 72375)

== Ministry of Transport ==
=== Transport Troops ===
The troops of the Ministry of Transport, called the Transport Troops (Bulgaria) (bg:Войски на Министерството на транспорта, ВМT) (or Railway Troops), were a paramilitary construction organization subordinate to the Ministry of Transport, which existed from 1975 to 2001. It dealt mainly with the construction of highways and railways. They were a paramilitary formation divided into railway construction brigades and automobile transportation brigades tasked with the construction and maintenance of transport infrastructure. In case of war the Transport Troops would have come under the Ministry of People's Defence.

By Decree No. 4 of January 14, 1888, the first paramilitary railway unit was established - the Railway Company of the Pioneer Regiment in Ruse. The first railway officer in Bulgaria was the future general Petar Lolov.

The Transport Troops themselves were established by Decree No. 147 of 27 January 1975 on the basis of the Railway and Liaison Construction Brigade of the Ministry of Transport, established in 1965.

== Posts and Telecommunications Committee ==
=== Signal Troops ===
The Posts and Telecommunications Committee Troops (Войски на Комитета по пощи и далекосъобщения) were a paramilitary formation tasked with building and maintaining the communication infrastructure of state institutions, including phone lines, TV towers, civil air traffic communications, etc. In war time the troops would have fallen under the Ministry of People's Defence.
