= Construction Corps (Bulgaria) =

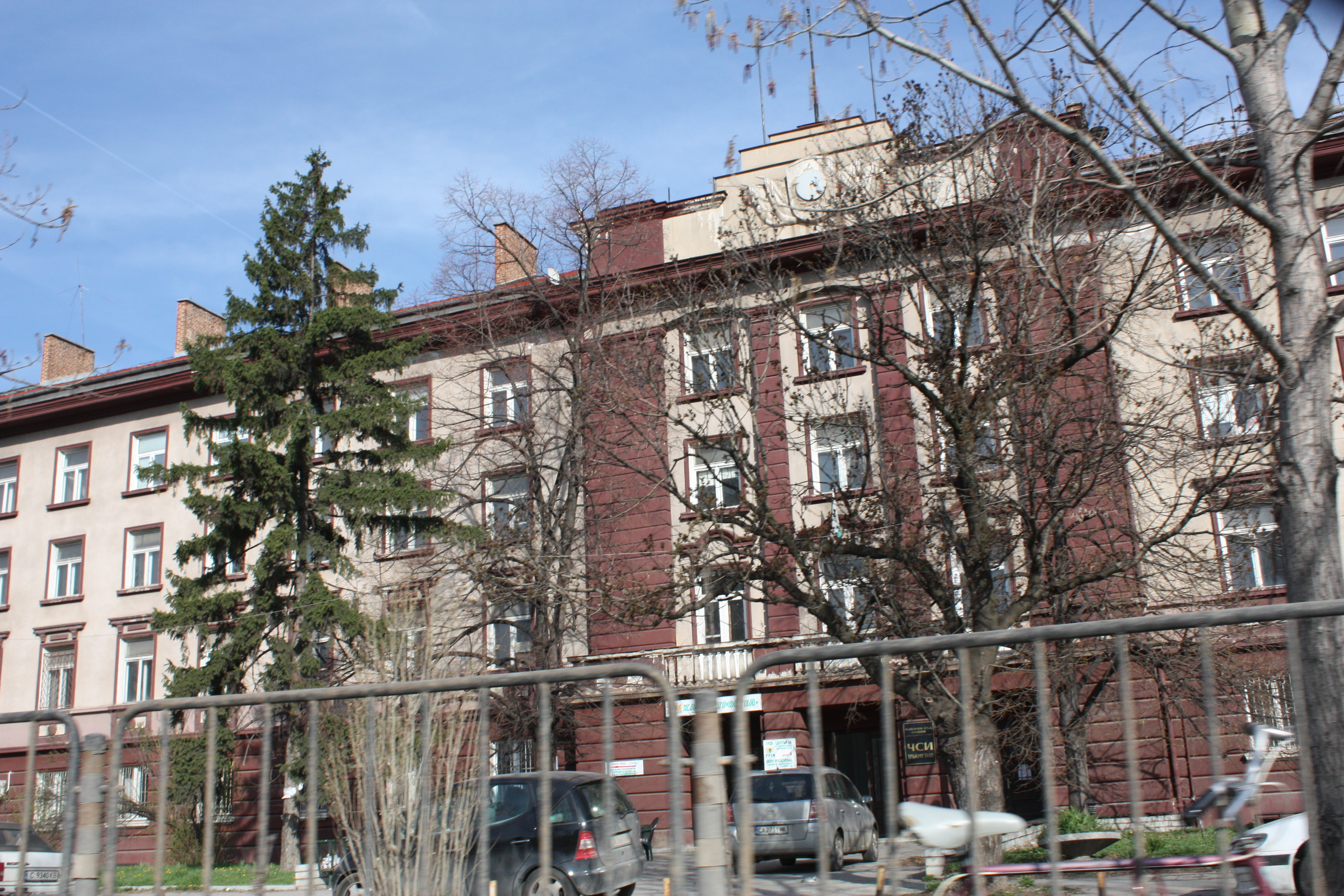
The central Construction Troops building in Sofia (126 Tsar Boris III Blvd.), now used by the Sofia District Court

The Construction Corps (Bulgarian: Строителни войски) in Bulgaria was a military construction organisation subordinated to the Ministry of Defence or directly to the government, which existed from 1920 to 2000.

The organisation started as national compulsory labour service (trudova povinnost) in 1920 which drafted all able-bodied Bulgarians in place of national military service. It was militarised and incorporated into the armed forces as the Labour Corps (Trudovi Voiski) during the period 1935–1946. During the Communist era it was re-organised a number of times, taking its final form and name in 1969.

== History ==
=== National compulsory labour service 1920–1935 ===
In the last months of World War I, the Ministry of War announced the idea of a conscription-based national labour service. For this purpose a commission was appointed consisting of: Chairman Major General Konstantin Kirkov; members: Colonel Ivan Bozhkov, Lieutenant Colonel Kosta Nikolov, Lieutenant Colonel Dimitar Nachev, Lieutenant General Stilian Kovachev, Lieutenant Colonel Todor Georgiev, Hristo Chakalov – Manager of the BNB, two agronomists and a representative of the Bulgarian Agricultural Bank. The original law drafted by the commission was not approved by the Council of Ministers but the draft did become the basis for all subsequent legislation on the subject.

Defeat in World War 1 brought to power in October 1919 the radical anti-war Agrarian party leader Aleksandar Stamboliyski. Faced with the ruinous consequences of the war Stamboliyski adopted compulsory labour service as one of two key reforms aimed at rebuilding the country (the other being land reform). The Bill provoked vehement opposition on the ground that it revived the Ottoman feudal labour obligation and exploited young people, but Stamboliyski's overwhelming election victory in 1920 meant it was voted into law on 23 May 1920.

Stamboliyski's official reasons were to enable post-war reconstruction at a time when the impoverished country was faced with enormous war reparations; and to provide modern vocational education for young men and women. However, an underlying reason was to circumvent the limitations of the Treaty of Neuilly-sur-Seine on the size of the Bulgarian Armed Forces, which limited the army to 20,000. The new labour service de facto maintained the organisational structure of the former national military service, prompting protests from the neighbouring Yugoslavia and Greece that all the Bulgarians had to do was replace the spades with rifles and they'd have a trained army. The Inter-Allied Commission required the bill to be suspended until changes were agreed.

Compulsory labour service came into force on 14 June 1920 with the establishment of the Main Directorate "Compulsory Labour Service" within the Ministry of Public Works. All able-bodied Bulgarians, except those exempted for legitimate reasons (for example muslim females were exempted) and those who had served the state for more than three consecutive months, were required to serve either in the Regular service (eight months maximum for men between 20 and 40 years, four months for women between 16 and 30 years) or in the Temporary service up to 21 days a year. Exemptions could also be purchased at a set daily rate.

Labour service proved very effective in carrying out post-war reconstruction. The vast majority of the work was road and railway construction, although there were also manufacturing, agriculture and reforestation projects. An International Labour Report calculated that just in the Regular service from 1921 to 1936 a total of 313,669 "trudovaks" (labourers) were recorded as completing their compulsory service; that the work done for the State entailed 22,591,068 eight-hour days and reached a value of 1,680,088,675 leva; and that the annual balance-sheets showed aggregate receipts of 3,330,466,451 leva and expenditure of 2,449,101,898 leva, or a profit of 881,364,553 leva. The Bulgarian example was widely studied and copied abroad, for instance by Germany in the formation of the Reich Labour Service.

=== Labour corps 1935–1944 ===
In the 1930s, as Bulgaria followed Germany in repudiating the military limitations imposed by the WW1 Paris peace treaties the labour service openly emerged as a military organisation. On 1 January 1935 jurisdiction was transferred to the Ministry of Defence, with the establishment of military ranks in 1936. Military age conscripts served in the regular armed forces or did labour service – one example being future Communist leader Todor Zhivkov who completed service in 1935, partially through work and partially through exemption purchase. In 1938 with the signing of the Salonika Agreement limits on the armed forces were officially removed and Bulgaria was able to fully reinstate compulsory military service. In 1940 the new Law of the Armed Forces officially incorporated "trudovaks" in the armed forces as the labour corps (trudovi voiski). By 1942 the fully mobilised wartime labour corps exceeded 80,000 men building roads and military installations, draining the Svishtov wetlands, increasing agricultural production and restoring communications in the newly recovered Southern Dobruja, Western Thrace and Vardar Macedonia.

During the war as Bulgaria allied with Nazi Germany Jewish men were drafted en-masse in the labour corps. In January 1941, the anti-semitic Law for Protection of the Nation came into effect, one of whose stipulations was that Jews must fulfill their military service in labour battalions. By order of the Bulgarian chief of the general staff, effective 27 January 1941, Jews were removed from the regular armed forces and were drafted in the labour corps, while retaining their military rank and privileges. Jewish reservists were allocated as labour corps reservists. After Bulgaria joined the Tripartite Pact on 1 March 1941 and became a base for German military operations against Yugoslavia and Greece repressive measures increased. From August 1941 Jewish men aged 20–44 were drafted (including all reservists), rising to 50 in 1943. Following diplomatic protests from German ambassador Adolf-Heinz Beckerle about the German Labour Front working alongside Bulgarian Jews in a military capacity from Jan 1942 Jews were transferred to labour units under the Ministry of Public Works, depriving them of their military ranks and privileges. Those units (usually 100-300 strong) were based in remote camps with poor conditions and typically did heavy labour completing specific stretches of roads. Approximately 12,000 Jews were mobilised in such units in addition to 2,000 communists and left wing agrarians. There were a number of reports of abusive behaviour by camp commandants, although it should be stressed that despite latter Communist governments' terming them "fascist concentration camps" these were in no way such - for instance labourers still had family leave and correspondence, and heads of family were paid a wage.

Greeks from Bulgarian occupation zone in Macedonia and Thrace were also forcibly conscripted into Labour Battalions. The measure did not exclude Greek Muslims.

=== Post War ===
From 1946 given the need to downsize the armed forces the labour corps were again detached from the army and re-organised as national compulsory labour service. All Bulgarian citizens of conscription age not accepted in the regular armed forces were subject to 18 months labour service, but de facto it was done mostly by men from minorities and those deemed unreliable for service ("considered unfit") in the armed forces.

A high point in the history of the Construction Troops was the design and building of the Alfred Beit Road Bridge in 1994–95. The Construction Troops won a commercial tender in competition with international companies. The metal works of the bridge were manufactured in Bulgaria and transported via ship from Burgas to the South African port of Durban and then on a 1,000 km stretch over land. The bridge is the only road border crossing on the South Africa–Zimbabwe border. The commander of the Construction Troops, Major General Radoslav Peshleevski (bg:Радослав Пешлеевски) attended the official opening ceremony (seen in uniform behind Nelson Mandela.)

== Structure ==
They were organized in seven Construction Divisions: three based in Sofia and one each in Plovdiv, Stara Zagora, Varna and Pleven.

Main Directorate of the Construction Troops (Главно управление на Строителните Войски)

- Command (Командване)
  - Chief of the Main Directorate of the Construction Troops (Началник на Главно управление на СВ)
  - First Deputy-Chief and Chief of the Political Department (Зам.-началник на СВ, той е и началник на Политическо управление на СВ)
  - Deputy-Chief of the Construction Troops in Charge of the Construction Troops (Зам.-началник на СВ по строителството)
  - Deputy-Chief of the Construction Troops in Charge of the Rear (logistics) (Зам.-началник на СВ, той е и началник тил на СВ)
  - Deputy-Chief of the Construction Troops in Charge of the Economical Matters (Зам.-началник на СВ по икономическите въпроси)
- Staff (Щаб)
- Independent Departments and Branches of the MDCT (Самостоятелни управления и отдели в ГУСВ)
- Operational Formations:
  - 1st Construction Mechanized Division (1ва Строителна Механизирана Дивизия (1. СМД)) (Sukhodol, Sofia)
    - Command; Staff; Supply Company (Sukhodol, Sofia)
    - Training Battalion (Учебен Батальон) (Golemo Buchino, Pernik Province)
    - Special Battalion (Специален Батальон, for pre-production of building elements) (Sukhodol, Sofia; Pernik and Stanke Dimitrov)
    - 1st Construction Regiment (1. Строителен Полк) (Botevgrad) (battalion and platoon in Botevgrad; battalion in Pravets)
    - 2nd Construction Regiment (2. Строителен Полк) (Kyustendil) (battalion in Kyustendil; cadred battalions in Bobov Dol and Stanke Dimitrov, cadred platoon in Tran)
    - 3rd Construction Regiment (3. Строителен Полк) (Pernik) (companies and platoons in Pernik, Samokov and the villages around them; cadred battalion in Bornaevo)
    - 4th Construction Regiment (4. Строителен Полк) (Blagoevgrad) (battalions in Blagoevgrad, Sukhodol, Sofia, Petrich, Ilindentsi, cadred companies in Gotse Delchev and at the "Belmeken-Sestrimo" water supply cascade and a platoon at the Rila Monastery)
    - Automobile Machinery Regiment - Sofia (Автомашинен Полк - София) (Sukhodol, Sofia; Blagoevgrad, Pernik, Kyustendil, Samokov and Botevgrad)
  - 5th Construction Mechanized Division (5та Строителна Механизирана Дивизия (5. СМД)) (Pleven)
    - Command; Staff; Supply Company and Training Battalion (Pleven)
    - 1st Construction Regiment (1. Строителен Полк) (Roman) (5 battalions and a company in Roman)
    - 2nd Construction Regiment (2. Строителен Полк) (Yasen) (battalion in Yasen, companies in Pleven, Lovech, Yasen and Zlatna Panega)
    - 3rd Construction Regiment (3. Строителен Полк) (Vratsa) (companies and Vratsa, Vidin, Kozloduy and Slatina, platoon in Boychinovtsi)
    - 4th Construction Regiment (4. Строителен Полк) (Veliko Tarnovo) (two battalions in Veliko Tarnovo, platoon in Svishtov)
    - 5th Construction Regiment (5. Строителен Полк) (Gabrovo) (two battalions and three companies in Gabrovo and the nearby villages)
    - Automobile Machinery Regiment - Pleven (Автомашинен Полк - Плевен) (Yasen) (cadred battalions in Yasen, Roman and Veliko Tarnovo, cadred companies in Yasen and Vratsa)
  - 6th Construction Mechanized Division (6та Строителна Механизирана Дивизия (6. СМД)) (Plovdiv)
    - Command; Staff; Supply Company and Training Battalion in Plovdiv, a platoon in Koprivshtitsa
    - 1st Construction Regiment (1. Строителен Полк) (Sopot) (battalions in Sopot, Kalofer and Karnare, platoon in Klisura)
    - 2nd Construction Regiment (2. Строителен Полк) (Panagyurishte) (battalion and company in Panagyurishte, battalion in Elshitsa and a platoon at the Copper Refinery Complex "Medet")
    - 3rd Construction Regiment (3. Строителен Полк) (Smolyan) (battalions in Smolyan and Kardzhali, companies in Pamporovo, Madan and Smilyan)
    - 4th Construction Regiment (4. Строителен Полк) (Plovdiv) (battalion in Plovdiv, companies in Svilengrad, Peshtera and Hisar, platoons in Parvomai and Laki)
    - Independent Construction Battalion (Velingrad) (7 platoons in Velingrad, platoon in Tsvetino and platoon in Yadenitsa)
    - Automobile Machinery Regiment - Plovdiv (5. Автомашинен Полк - Пловдив) (Plovdiv) (companies in Plovdiv, Smolyan, Sopot and Panagyurishte, platoons in Plovdiv and Velingrad)
    - Divisionary Special Company (blacksmith workshop) (Plovdiv)
  - 13th Construction Mechanized Division (13та Строителна Механизирана Дивизия (13. СМД)) (Varna)
    - Command; Staff; Supply Company and Training Battalion (Varna)
    - 1st Construction Regiment (1. Строителен Полк) (Devnya) (two battalions in Devnya, battalion in Kipra)
    - 2nd Construction Regiment (2. Строителен Полк) (Varna) (battalion and two companies in Varna, battalion in Novi Pazar)
    - 3rd Construction Regiment (3. Строителен Полк) (Shumen) (battalion in Shumen, battalion and two companies in Matnitsa)
    - 4th Construction Regiment (4. Строителен Полк) (Devnya)
    - 5th Construction Regiment (5. Строителен Полк) (Smyadovo)
    - Independent Service Regiment - Varna (Отделен Полк – Услуга – Варна) (Varna)
    - Independent Service Regiment - Devnya (Батальон – Услуга – Девня) (Devnya)
    - Independent Service Battalion - Ruse (Батальон – Услуга – Русе) (Ruse)
    - Automobile Machinery Regiment - Varna (Автомашинен Полк - Варна) (Varna) (battalions in Varna, Shumen and Devnya, companies in Varna and Smyadovo)
    - Disciplinary Rehabilitation Battalion (Дисциплинарен изправителен батальон) (Chernevo)
  - 18th Construction Mechanized Division (18та Строителна Механизирана Дивизия (18. СМД)) (Stara Zagora)
    - Command; Staff; Supply Company and Training Battalion (Stara Zagora)
    - 1st Construction Regiment (1. Строителен Полк) (Sliven) (two battalions in Sliven, battalion in Bratya Kunchevi)
    - 2nd Construction Regiment (2. Строителен Полк) (Burgas) (battalion in Burgas, companies in Primorsko and Malko Tarnovo, platoons in Sarafovo, Grudovo and Vlas)
    - 3rd Construction Regiment (3. Строителен Полк) (Kazanlak) (battalion in Kazanlak, battalion in Sheynovo and a battalion at the Buzludzha)
    - 4th Construction Regiment (4. Строителен Полк) (Yambol) (battalion and company in Yambol, battalion in Elhovo)
    - 5th Construction Regiment (5. Строителен Полк) (Radnevo) (battalion in Mednikarevo, companies in Radnevo, Stara Zagora and Yabalkovo and a service company in Troyanovo)
    - Divisionary Service Company - Stara Zagora (Дивизионна Рота – Услуга – Стара Загора) (Stara Zagora)
    - Special Battalion - Stara Zagora (Специален батальон – Стара Загора) (Stara Zagora)
    - Automobile Machinery Regiment - Stara Zagora (Автомашинен Полк - Стара Загора) (Stara Zagora) (battalions in Sliven, Kazanlak and Radnevo, companies in Burgas and Yambol)
    - Disciplinary Rehabilitation Battalion (Дисциплинарен изправителен батальон) (Mednikarevo)
  - 20th Construction Mechanized Division (20та Строителна Механизирана Дивизия (20. СМД)) (Gorublyane, Sofia)(see bg:20-а общостроителна дивизия)
    - Command; Staff; Supply Company (Gorublyane, Sofia) and Training Battalion (Chelopechene)
    - 1st Construction Regiment (1. Строителен Полк) (Busmantsi) (battalion and company in Busmantsi, battalion in Bukhovo, platoon in Zhivkovo)
    - 2nd Construction Regiment (2. Строителен Полк) (Darvenitsa, Sofia) (three battalions and a company in Darvenitsa)
    - 3rd Construction Regiment (3. Строителен Полк МОК "Елаците") (Ravna Reka) (3 battalions at the Mining Refining Complex "Elatsite")
    - 4th Construction Regiment (4. Строителен Полк) (Chelopech) (two battalions in Chelopech, company in Mirkovo)
    - Special Regiment (Специален полк) (Busmantsi) (two battalions and a company in Busmantsi)
    - Special Regiment (Специален полк) (Chelopechene) (company and platoon in Chelopechene, company in Chelopech)
    - 1st Service Regiment (1. Полк – Услуга) (Bukhovo)
    - 2nd Service Regiment (2. Полк – Услуга) (Sofia)
    - Automobile Machinery Company (Автомашинна Рота) (Chelopechene)
  - 25th Construction Mechanized Division (25. Строителна Механизирана Дивизия) (Sofia) (housing construction)
    - Command; Staff; Supply Company; Training Battalion (Sofia)
    - 1st Construction Regiment (1. Строителен Полк) (Zemlyane, Sofia)
    - 2nd Construction Regiment (2. Строителен Полк) (Obelya, Sofia)
    - 3rd Construction Regiment (3. Строителен Полк) (Boyana - the National Cinema Center, Sofia)
    - 4th Construction Regiment (4. Строителен Полк) (Obelya, Sofia)
    - Special High Construction Battalion (Специален Батальон Батальон за Работа по Високи Обекти) (Zemlyane, Sofia)
    - Automobile Machinery Regiment - Obelya (Автомашинен Полк - Обеля) (Obelya, Sofia)
    - Service Company (Осигурителна Рота) (Lagera, Sofia)
  - Electrical Machinery and Installation Brigade (Електромашинна и монтажна бригада) (Sofia)
    - Command; Staff; Supply Platoon; Heavy Transportation and Mechanization Company (Sofia)
    - 1st Installation Regiment (1. Монтажен Полк) (Sofia)
      - Independent Installation Platoon (Самостоятелен Монтажен Взвод) (Chelopech)
      - 1st Installation Battalion (1. Монтажен Батальон) (Sofia)
      - 2nd Installation Battalion (2. Монтажен Батальон) (Blagoevgrad)
    - 2nd Installation Regiment (2. Монтажен Полк) (Plovdiv)
      - 1st Installation Battalion (1. Монтажен Батальон) (Smolyan)
      - 2nd Installation Battalion (2. Монтажен Батальон) (Sopot)
      - 3rd Installation Battalion (2. Монтажен Батальон) (Sliven)
    - 3rd Installation Regiment (3. Монтажен Полк) (Varna)
      - 1st Installation Battalion (1. Монтажен Батальон) (Devnya)
      - 2nd Installation Battalion (2. Монтажен Батальон) (Shumen)
  - 9th Construction Mechanization Brigade (9. Бригада за строителна механизация) (Chelopechene, Sofia)
    - Command; Staff; Supply Platoon; Construction Platoon (Chelopechene, Sofia)
    - Lift Transport Battalion (Самостоятелен Подемно-транспортен Батальон) (Chelopechene, Sofia)
    - Automobile Machinery Battalion (Самостоятелен Автомашинен Батальон) (Iskar Railway Station)
    - Automobile Machinery Battalion (Самостоятелен Автомашинен Батальон) (Chelopech)
    - Building Materials Mixtures Regiment (Полк за строителни разтвори) (Chelopechene) (concrete mixing trucks)
    - Combined Repair Workshop (Обединена ремонтна работилница) (Chelopechene)
- Support Institutions:
  - Complex Institute for Scientific Research, Development, Project and Implementation Activities of the Construction Troops (Комплексен Институт за Научноизследователска, Развойна, Проектантска и Внедрителска Дейност на Строителни Войски (КИНИРПВД – СВ)) (Sofia)
    - Direction (Направление Научно-изследователска и Развойна Дейност)
    - Direction Laboratories, Experimentation and Implementation (Направление Лаборатории, Експериментиране и Внедряване)
    - Direction Projects (Направление Проектиране)
  - Higher People's Military School for Construction "General Blagoi Ivanov" (Висше Народно Военно Строително Училище (ВНВСУ) "Ген. Благой Иванов") (Sofia) – trained career Construction Troops officers
    - Intermediate Military Construction Sergeant School (Средно сержантско военно строително училище (ССВСУ))
  - School for Installation Cadres (Школа за монтажни кадри) (Burgas)

== See also ==
- ru:Строительные войска – Soviet and Russian Construction Troops
