= Transport Troops (Bulgaria) =

Service branch of the Armed Forces of Belarus

- Войски на Министерството на транспорта
- Founded: January 14, 1888
- Disbanded: 2001
- Country: Bulgaria
- Branch: Armed Forces of Bulgaria
- Type: Mobile Force; Railway troops
- Role: Troop transport
- Part of: Ministry of Transport
- Headquarters: Sofia

The Transport Troops (Bulgarian: Войски на Министерството на транспорта) or the Railway Troops was a paramilitary construction organization of the Armed Forces of Bulgaria subordinate to the Ministry of Transport. It existed from 1975 to 2001 and dealt mainly with the construction of highways and railways. They were a paramilitary formation divided into railway construction brigades and automobile transportation brigades tasked with the construction and maintenance of transport infrastructure. In case of war the Transport Troops would have come under the Ministry of People's Defence.

== History ==
=== Early activity ===
By decree No. 4 of January 14, 1888, the first paramilitary railway unit was established, the Railway Company of the Pioneer Regiment in Ruse. The first railway officer in Bulgaria was the future general Petar Lolov.

=== People's Republic of Bulgaria ===
The transport troops themselves were established by decree No. 147 of 27 January 1975 on the basis of the Railway and Communications Construction Brigade of the Ministry of Transport, which was established in turn in 1965. By decree No. 3 of the Council of Ministers, the Railway Troops were transformed into Troops of the Ministry of Transport. The officers are recruited from conscript military units and are subject to the Law on Universal Military Service in the People's Republic of Bulgaria. The troops are under the command of the Minister of Transport, the officers are dismissed by the Minister of War upon the proposal of the Minister of Transport. The Todor Kableshkov Semi-Higher Railway Institute trains personnel for the needs of the troops.

=== Post-communism ===
By decree No. 1116 of the 1989/1990 academic year, the Secondary Sergeant Railway School of the Bulgarian State Railways was opened. January 14 was declared an official holiday for the troops of the Ministry of Transport. As of 2000, the personnel of the troops numbered 8,016 people, of whom 611 were officers, 625 sergeants, 2,268 soldiers, 140 schoolchildren, and 4,372 workers and employees.

On December 31, 2001, the troops were closed down by the Law on the Transformation of the Construction Troops, the Troops of the Ministry of Transport and the Troops of the Committee for Posts and Telecommunications into State Enterprises. The successor to the troops is the State Enterprise "Transport Construction and Reconstruction".

== See also ==
- Railway Troops (Russian Army)
- Transportation Corps (United States Army)
- People's Liberation Army Joint Logistics Support Force
- Outline of the Bulgarian People's Army at the end of the Cold War
