= Todor Georgiev =

Bulgarian American research scientist and inventor

Todor G. Georgiev
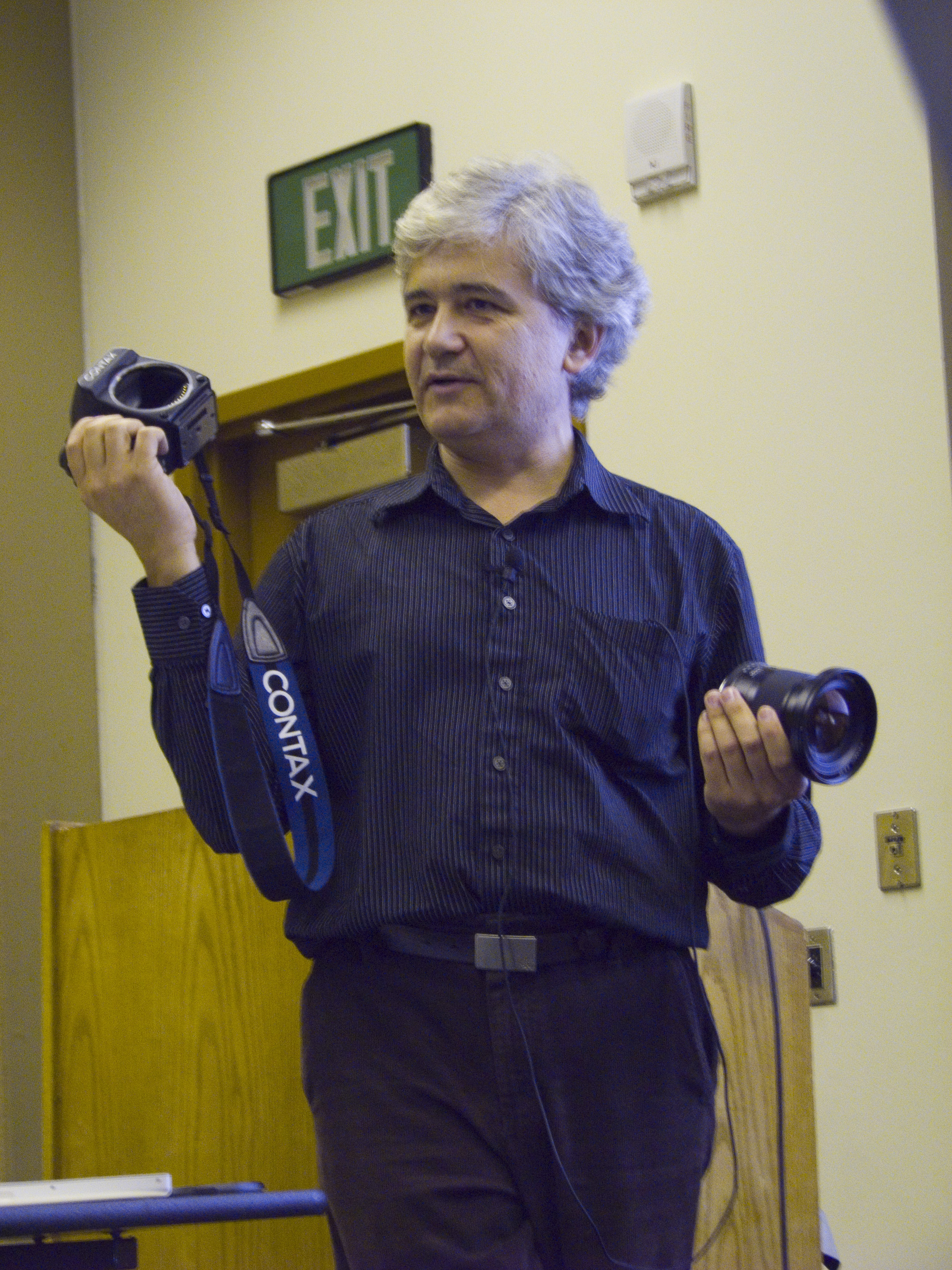
- Todor Georgiev in 2008
- Education: Southern Illinois University, PhD
- Known for: Plenoptic Cameras, Photoshop Healing Brush
- Scientific career
- Fields: Imaging, Computer Vision, Physics
- Workplaces: Adobe, Inc.

Todor G. Georgiev is a Bulgarian American research scientist and inventor, best known for his work on plenoptic cameras. He is the author of the Healing Brush tool in Adobe Photoshop, and, as of 2020, is a principal scientist at Adobe in San Jose, California. Georgiev's work has been cited 7700 times as of 2020. As an inventor, he has at least 89 patents to his name.

Georgiev was born and raised in Bulgaria and went on to study quantum physics in the United States, where he received his doctoral degree in 1996. In the early 2000s, Georgiev created the Healing Brush, Photoshop's healing tool also known as Poisson image editing. The Healing Brush gives users the ability to correct an image's flaws by incorporating the texture, lighting, transparency, and shading of sampled pixels to the pixels being healed. The tool shipped with Photoshop 7.0 in 2002. Todor has also worked on a variety of Photoshop's tools including Match Color, Content Aware Scaling, and Content Aware Fill.

In 2007, Georgiev developed the "plenoptic light field" lens which attaches to a typical digital camera and captures several images at once, allowing you to refocus photos after they have been shot. One prototype has 19 lenses, each with a prism at a unique angle that allows the photographer to capture 19 pictures at once, each one capturing a different part of the scene in focus. Adobe software can then analyze the images, allowing for digital 3D photo editing. Georgiev was one of the first to incorporate plenoptics into modern software.

== See also ==
- Focused plenoptic camera
