= Ministry of Transport and Communications (Bulgaria) =

Government ministry of Bulgaria

- Министерство на транспорта, информационните технологии и съобщенията Ministerstvo na transporta, informatsionnite tehnologii i saobshteniyata
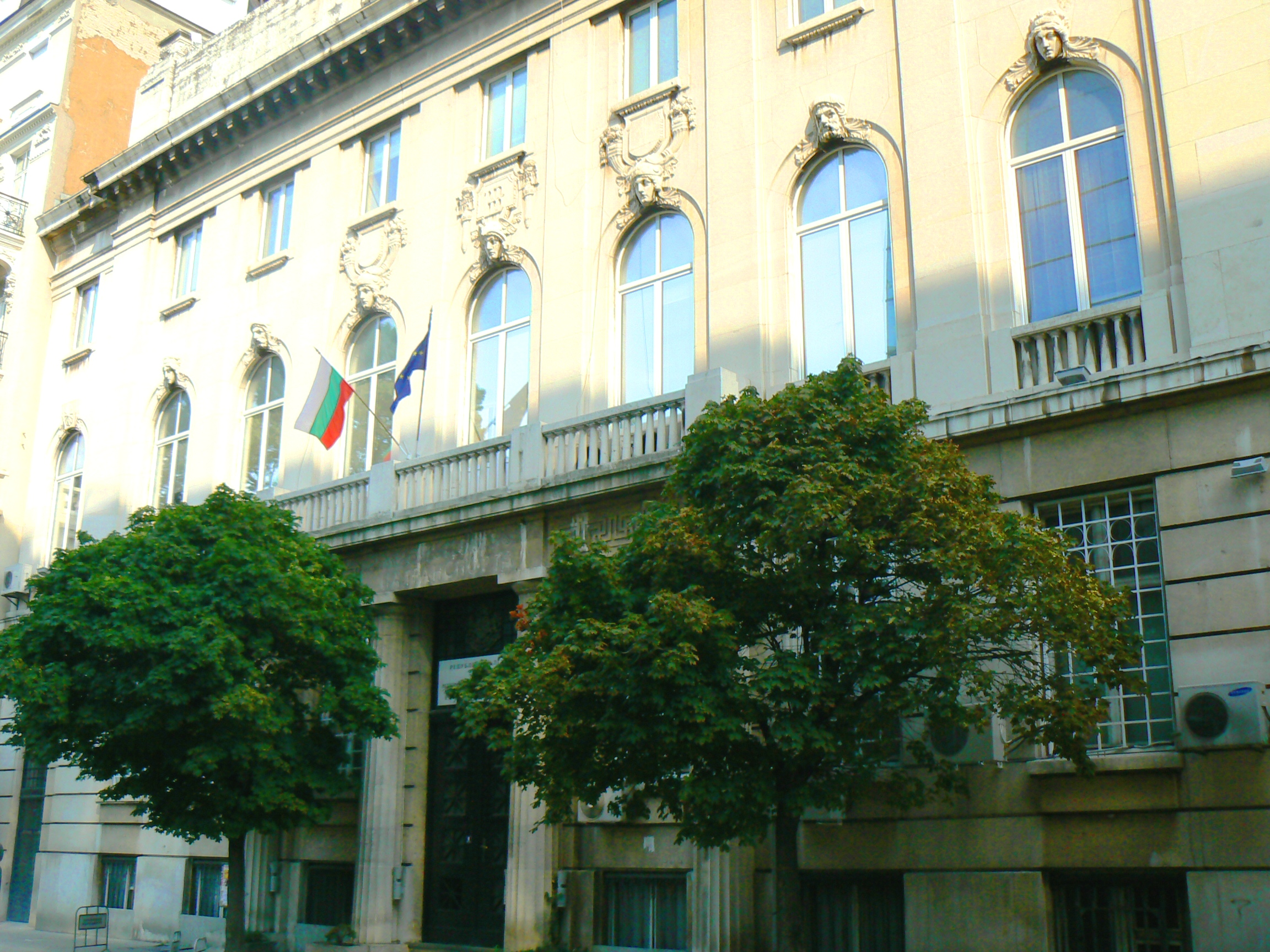
- Office of the Ministry of Transport, Information Technology and Communications of Bulgaria. The building previously served as a bank office and was built in 1910.

Agency overview
- Formed: 5 July 1879
- Jurisdiction: Government of Bulgaria
- Headquarters: Sofia
- Agency executive: Korman Ismailov, Minister
- Website: www.mtc.government.bg

The Ministry of Transport and Communications of Bulgaria (Bulgarian: Министерство на транспорта, информационните технологии и съобщенията, romanized: Ministerstvo na transporta, informatsionnite tehnologii i saobshteniyata) is a Bulgarian government ministry, which includes:

- Information Technology Directorate, concerned with policies for the development of IT in Bulgaria
- Electronic Government Directorate – electronic government policies in Bulgaria
- European Coordination and International Cooperation Directorate – European Union policies

The current Minister is Korman Ismailov.

The Ministry was known simply as the Ministry of Transport from 1966 to 1999.

== Transport Troops ==
The troops of the Ministry of Transport, called the Transport Troops (bg:Войски на Министерството на транспорта, ВМT) (or Railway Troops), were a paramilitary construction organization subordinate to the Ministry of Transport, which existed from 1975 to 2001. It dealt mainly with the construction of highways and railways. They were divided into railway construction brigades and automobile transportation brigades tasked with the construction and maintenance of transport infrastructure. In case of war the Transport Troops would have come under the Ministry of People's Defence.

By Decree № 4 of January 14, 1888, the first paramilitary railway unit was established – the Railway Company of the Pioneer Regiment in Ruse. The first railway officer in Bulgaria was the future general Petar Lolov.

The Transport Troops themselves were established by Decree № 147 of 27 January 1975 on the basis of the Railway and Liaison Construction Brigade of the Ministry of Transport, established in 1965.
