= Roman, Bulgaria =

Town in Roman municipality, Vratsa province, Bulgaria

Coordinates: 43°09′N 23°55′E

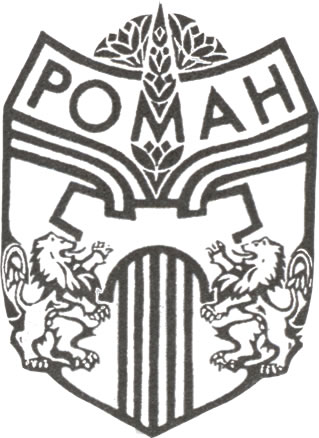
Coat of arms of Roman

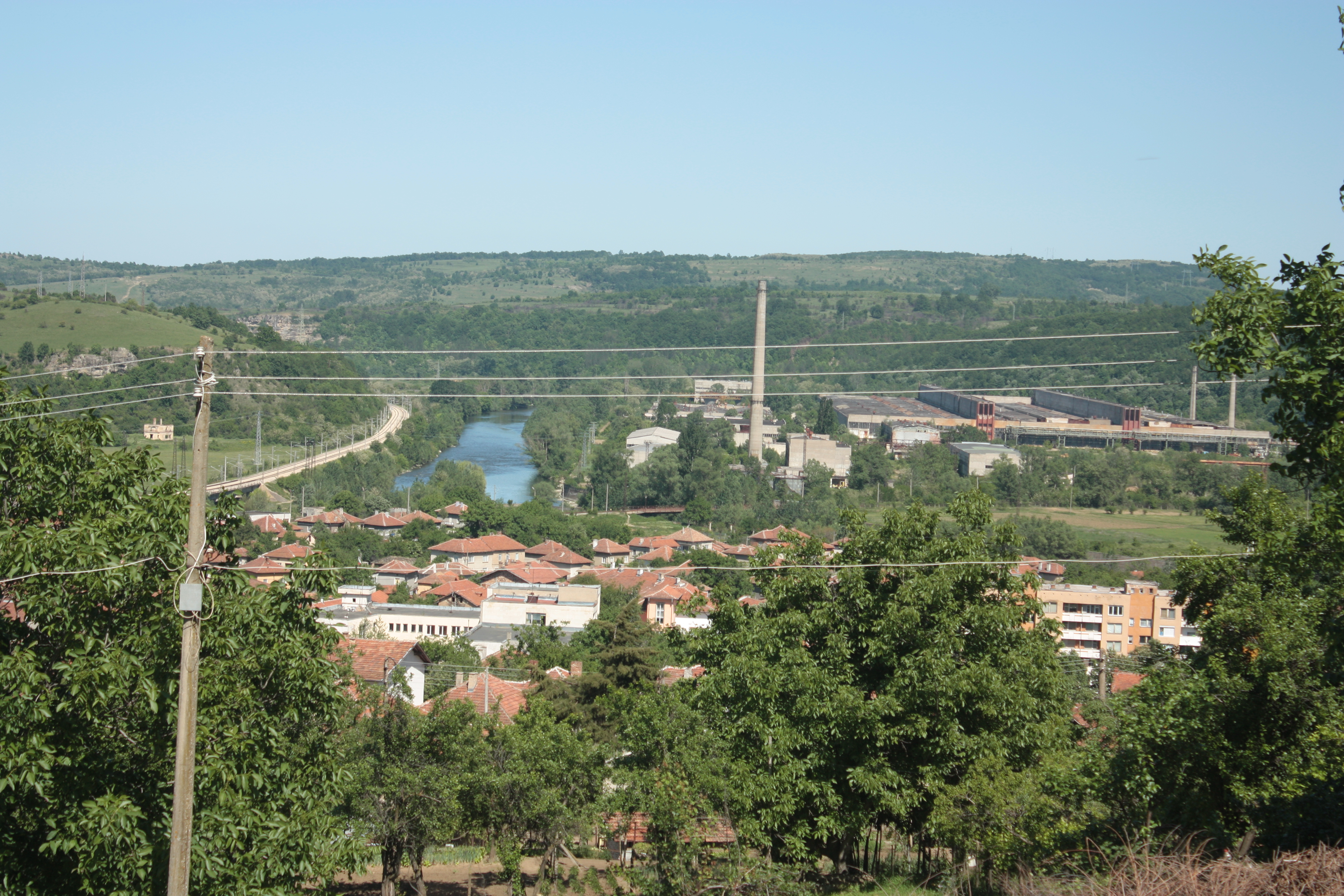

Roman (Bulgarian: Роман [ˈrɔmɐn]) is a small town in northwestern Bulgaria near the city of Pravets and about 90 km northeast of Sofia. It is located in Vratsa Province and is known for the big steel factory, producing 100,000 tons of steel per year. The raw materials come from the Kremikovtsi factory near Sofia. As of December 2009, the town had a population of 3,157.

Roman Knoll on Trinity Peninsula in Antarctica is named after the town.
