= Bulgarian Air Force =

Air warfare branch of Bulgaria's armed forces

- Военновъздушни сили; Voennovazdushni sili
- Emblem of the Bulgarian Air Force
- Founded: 20 April 1906
- Country: Bulgaria
- Type: Air force
- Role: Aerial warfare
- Size: 8,500 active personnel 75 aircraft
- Part of: Bulgarian Armed Forces
- Anniversaries: 16 October
- Website: af.armf.bg/bg/

Commanders
- Commander: Major General Nikolay Rusev
- Deputy Commander: Brigadier General Dimitar Yankov Georgiev
- Chief of Staff: Colonel
- Chief Master Sergeant of the Air Force: CMSGT Rumen Petrov

Insignia
- Roundel

Aircraft flown
- Attack: Su-25
- Fighter: MiG-29, F-16
- Helicopter: Mil Mi-17, Eurocopter AS 532 Cougar, Cabri G2, Bell 206
- Attack helicopter: Mil Mi-24
- Reconnaissance: An-30
- Trainer: L-39, PC-9, Zlín Z 42
- Transport: L-410, C-27J Spartan, Pilatus PC-12, An-26, An-2

The Bulgarian Air Force (Bulgarian: Военновъздушни сили, romanized: Voennovazdushni sili) is one of the three branches of the Military of Bulgaria, the other two being the Bulgarian Navy and Bulgarian land forces. Its mission is to guard and protect the sovereignty of Bulgarian airspace, and jointly with the other branches, to protect territorial integrity. The Bulgarian Air Force is one of the oldest air forces in Europe and the world. In recent times it has been actively taking part in numerous NATO missions and exercises in Europe.

The current commanding officer of the Bulgarian Air Force is Major General Nikolai Rusev.

== History ==
=== Early years ===
Boris Maslennikov's airplane in flight, Sofia 1910

The Bulgarian Air Force dates back to the end of the 19th century. At the 1892 Plovdiv International Fair, two lieutenants of the Bulgarian Army flew in the 'La France' balloon owned by the Frenchman Eugène Godard. Later, inspired by the flight, they succeeded in convincing the Bulgarian General Staff that the Army should build a balloon force. Despite numerous refusals from military schools around Europe who would not teach Bulgarian officers to use airships, eventually the Imperial Aviation School in St. Petersburg enrolled Lieutenant Vasil Zlatarov as a student. On 20 April 1906 "Vazduhoplavatelno Otdelenie" (roughly translated as Aviation Squad, literally Airsailing Section) was created to operate observation balloons for the Army, initially as a part of Railway Battalion. After graduation Lt. Zlatarov was appointed its first commander. After operating small balloons, in 1911 a bigger Godard balloon was bought, and in 1912 the first indigenous balloon, Sofia-1, was constructed in Bulgaria using materials bought from Russia.

In 1910, a Russian aircraft engineer, Boris Maslennikov, was invited to Bulgaria, where he presented his airplane, a modification of the French Farman III. Following his demonstration, assisted by Vasil Zlatarov over the hippodrome in Sofia, the Bulgarian Government decided to acquire airplanes for The Aviation Corps. In early 1912 thirteen army officers were sent abroad for training as pilots and orders were placed for five French, British and German airplanes. The officers sent to France completed their training first and returned to Bulgaria in July 1912. The same year Bulgaria received its first airplane – a Bleriot XXI, which Simeon Petrov flew on 13 August 1912 to become the first Bulgarian to pilot an airplane over Bulgaria.

=== First and Second Balkan Wars ===
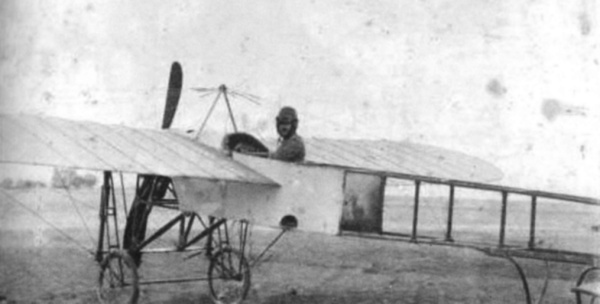
Simon Petrov in a Bleriot XI 1912

Following the outbreak of the First Balkan War, Bulgarian pilots, while still abroad, hastily procured aircraft to be shipped home after them and foreign volunteer pilots converged from all over Europe to fly for Bulgaria. After the front lines had stabilized, an Aeroplane Platoon was established at a new airfield close to the fighting.

Intelligence about the Turkish army strength and dispositions in the Edirne was required, and on 16 October 1912, two aviators performed a reconnaissance flight over the city in an Albatros F.2 biplane, also dropping two bombs. This was not only the first military mission performed by a Bulgarian aircraft, but also the first combat use of an aircraft in Europe and one of the first bombing attacks.

Later that month the Bulgarian Aviation Corps was expanded to three Aeroplane Platoons. Foreign volunteers began flying operational sorties alongside Bulgarian pilots and carried out reconnaissance, leaflet-dropping and bombing missions. During the war at least three aircraft were shot down. Considerable help was received from the Russians in terms of aircraft, maintenance and training. Due to low aircraft serviceability and frequent accidents, the number of missions flown was relatively low. Despite that, the Bulgarian airmen and their foreign allies were able to gather enough intelligence for the Army General Staff to help successfully capture of the city after a long siege. Although inflicting little physical damage, the bombs had a devastating effect on the defending Turkish garrison's morale and played a crucial part in the fall of the city, which was until then considered nearly impregnable. During the First Balkan War Bulgarian aviation undertook 70 combat sorties, including 11 bombing raids, during the Second Balkan War it undertook 6 sorties. All in all, during both wars, there were over 230 aircraft sorties, including non-combat flights. In addition to the Albatros F.2, Bulgaria flew Blériot XI and XXI, Bristol Prier, Farman VII and Nieuport IV aircraft, as well as examples provided by Sommer and Voisin.

=== World War I (1914–1918) ===
==== Army air action ====
Insignia from 1915 to 1918

The Tsardom of Bulgaria entered World War I as a member of the Central Powers on 4 October 1915. The Aeroplane Section of the Bulgarian Army was reformed with assistance from Germany and Austria. Aircraft were deployed to Kumanovo Airfield in support of advancing Bulgarian forces, but bad weather initially prevented any flying. Until then they had completed 11 combat sorties from an airfield in Sofia (now the central railway station). As the frontline advanced, the unit re-deployed to airfields near Belitsa and Xanthi, in modern Greece. Newly acquired German LVG aircraft were hastily pressed into action. Two more airfields were constructed near Udovo and Levunovo. The Allies began flying reconnaissance and bomber sorties against Bulgarian units on the Southern Balkan Front. Throughout World War I Bulgarian military aviation experienced a steady increase in both numbers and quality of aircraft; however, they remained inferior to those flown by the Allies, especially the British and French. The First Aeroplane Section (the country's only aircraft unit) was attached to the Second Bulgarian Army. It flew 255 sorties compared to 397 flown by the four squadrons of the Entente it opposed, and operated the following types:

- 12 LVG B.II – reconnaissance aircraft, the first group of six arriving in November 1915. Those two seaters were also used as fighters by the Bulgarians, as dedicated "scouts" were not available.
- 13 Otto C.I – a twin-tailed pusher bomber. The first Otto in arrived in May 1916.
- 18 Albatros C.III – reconnaissance aircraft, also used as trainers. First delivery in August 1916.
- 12 DFW C.V – reconnaissance aircraft, first arrived in August 1917.
- 6 Roland D.II fighters. During July 1917 the first of these arrived with the Section.
- 6 Roland D.III fighters, the first arriving at the end of 1917.
- 3 Fokker E.III fighters, first of these delivered in the spring of 1916.
- 8 Fokker D.VII – the best fighter used by Bulgaria in World War I. Delivery took place in September 1918 and they saw no action. 7 were scrapped in accordance with the peace treaty. The 8th flew as a two-seater after the war.
- 2 Albatros C.I. These were ordered by the Ottoman Empire before Bulgaria entered the war. During early 1915 a couple landed on then neutral Bulgarian territory after a navigational error, and they were seized.

In addition, the Bulgarian Navy used the following airplanes:

- 8 Friedrichshafen FF.33 floatplane bombers, starting in 1916
- 2 Rumpler 6B1 floatplane fighters, starting in 1916

A number of Bulgarian pilots flew with German air units at the Western Front and at Xanthi. They operated several types, including the Albatros D.III and Halberstadt, which would later mistakenly be listed on the Bulgarian inventory by some sources.

==== Captured Allied aircraft ====
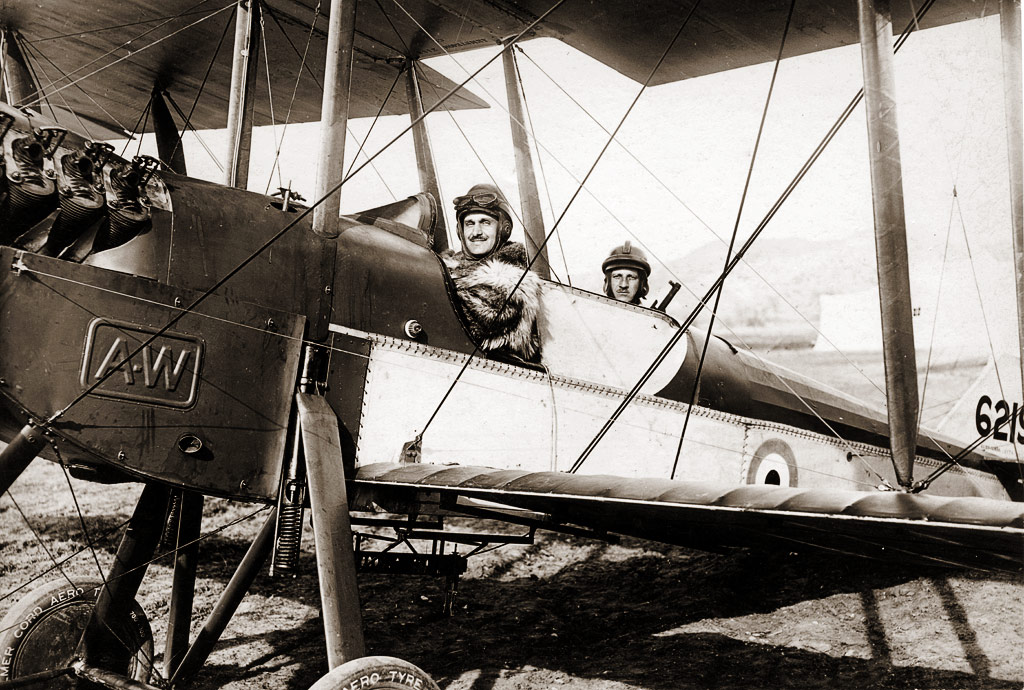
Bulgarian airmen in captured British Armstrong Whitworth F.K.3

On 30 September 1916 a French Farman F.40 bomber of Escadrille 384 was tasked with attacking the Bulgarian capital, Sofia. Two Bulgarian Fokker E.IIIs were positioned south of Sofia to intercept the intruder, while a flight of three armed Albatros C.III two-seat trainers covered the center of the city as backup. The bomber successfully dropped its bombs over Sofia while escaping anti-aircraft fire but, while departing, was attacked by the Bulgarian Fokkers, one piloted by Marko Parvanov, which brought the Farman down with a dead engine.

Another Allied aircraft, a British Armstrong Whitworth F.K.3, was captured by Bulgarian troops on 12 February 1917 after engine problems forced it to land. Both it and the crew were captured. It would receive Bulgarian insignia and be used to bomb Allied positions at night. Four such sorties were flown before being shot down on 23 May 1918.

A Nieuport 24bis and a Nieuport 27 were also captured. Lieutenant Vladimir Balan, a Bulgarian fighter pilot who had been flying with a German Jasta on the Western Front, was flying one of the Nieuports when he shot down the squadron leader of No. 17 Squadron RAF.

==== Naval air action ====
Bulgarian naval aviators also played an important role in the air war. In 1912 Petty-Officers Lyapchev and Mikhailov were sent, along with other officers and seamen, to the German naval aviation forming facilities for training. Another group of naval personnel followed in the beginning of the First World War. Training was held at List auf Sylt, Nordenham and Kiel. In November 1915 a seaplane station under German control was established near Varna, initially operating four Friedrichshafen FF.33 bombers and a Rumpler 6B1 fighter. Later, at the coast of the Varna Lake, a second seaplane station was built (this one under Bulgarian control), operating the same inventory. Near Sozopol a forward fuel and ammunition replenishment base was established in support of patrol flights over the southern Bulgarian coastline. At the end of 1917 the German station was transferred to the Bulgarian Navy. At the time of the armistice the Bulgarian fleet air arm comprised two seaplane stations, a forward replenishment base, three hangars, three workshops, ammunition warehouses and 10 seaplanes. After the cease-fire the machines were used for mine reconnaissance. At the end of 1919 they are transported by train to Bozhurishte Airfield to be scrapped along with the army aviation inventory.

The Bulgarian balloon observers also took part in the war. They were most active on the Dobrudzha Front, where aircraft activities were scarce (a German bomber squadron, flying missions against Bucharest and Constanţa: "Gotha" bombers accounted for the most flights). Near the Bulgarian city of Yambol an airship hangar was constructed to house German airships. The airship Schütte-Lanz SL 10 was the first to use it. According to documents of the time it was assigned to the Bulgarian Army, but was actually under German control. It was lost during a flight over the Black Sea in July 1916. In August 1916 the LZ 101 replaced it. After performing raids on targets in Romania and Greece it returned to Germany in August 1917. In November 1917 the naval airship L 59 arrived. That airship flew a series of remarkable missions, such as an attempted resupply of the garrison in the colony German East Africa and the bombing of Naples and Port Said. During a mission against the British naval base in Malta, a lightning strike over the Mediterranean Sea set it alight and completely destroyed it. All hands were lost.

=== Destruction and survival under the peace treaty (1919–1936) ===
On 4 October 1918 the Bulgarian Tsar issued a Royal Act of Demobilization. This resulted in military aviation being converted to its peacetime structure. The Aeroplane group, based in Bozhurishte comprised the following:

- Two aeroplane companies
- An aeroplane school
- An aeroplane atelliér
- An aeroplane depot

The Chaika Naval Seaplane station at Varna was under Naval command.

On 27 November 1919 the Treaty of Neuilly-sur-Seine was signed. In accordance with the treaty the Tsardom of Bulgaria was banned from operating military aircraft under any form for the next 20 years. All Bulgarian airplanes, balloons, aviation equipment, weaponry and ammunition were to be destroyed under Allied control and all personnel demobilised. Under the terms of the treaty any aircraft procured for civilian purposes had to be bought from the countries on the winning side. The combined engine power for any airplane (including multi-engined ones) was not to exceed 180 hp. In addition, the Bulgarian airspace was to be controlled by the allies and used according to the victorious countries' interests.

In accordance with the treaty during 1920 no less than 70 airplanes, 110 aircraft engines, 3 air balloons, 76 machine guns, a number of photographic cameras and other aviation equipment were destroyed at the military airfield of Bozhurishte. The seaplanes of the Bulgarian Navy were delivered by train to the same airfield and scrapped soon after that.

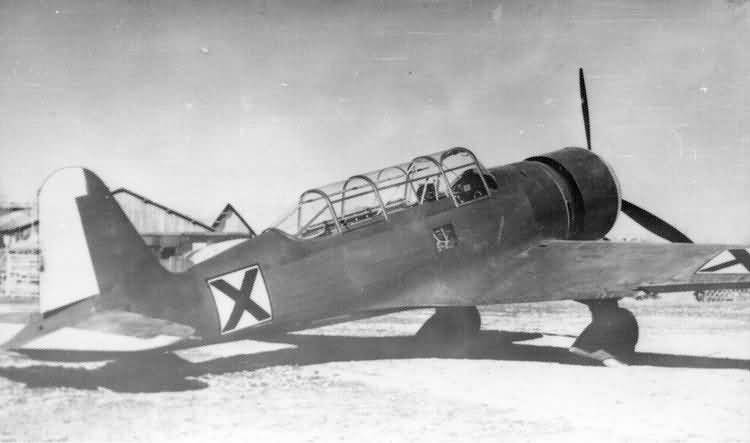
A Bulgarian-manufactured DAR 10 training plane was inspired by Polish PZL.43 light bomber. DAR produced small numbers of locally designed aircraft

Due to the devotion of the Air Troops personnel and the help of the population of the surrounding villages, several aircraft were hidden, thus evading Allied inspection following destruction. Seven DFW C.V, Albatros C.III and a single Fokker D.VII were among the survivors. In addition, at least ten aviation engines (Benz Bz.IV and Mercedes D.III) were also saved.

The Bulgarian government tried to get around the ban for military flight activity by establishing a Gendarmery Aeroplane Section in 1919. Since the Gendarmery was at that time a service under the Ministry of War, the creation of the unit was met by fierce opposition by the Allied commission. This almost resulted in the destruction of the whole Vrazhdebna Airfield, but the disbandment of the unit prevented this from happening.

An Aeroflight Section under the Ministry of Railways, Postal Service and Telegraph was created in 1920. Bulgarian aviation personnel assembled two airplanes from hidden spares and parts, salvaged from the destroyed military airplanes. The two aircraft, known as "the mixed planes", recorded about 1000 flight hours altogether. The sole remaining Bulgarian Fokker D.VII was disguised as a two-seater, thus being classified as a trainer and returning to active service.

On 5 July 1923 Bulgaria ratified the International Civil Aviation Treaty. From that moment on its air vehicles would carry a registration in the form B-B??? (the latter three signs being a combination of capital letters). In 1923 the first group of cadets, called "student-flyers" entered the Flying school at Vrazhdebna AF.

The following year (1924) the first new airplanes were acquired. Those were machines of the Potez VIII, Caudron C.59, Hanriot HD.14 and Bristol Tourer Type 29; Avro 522 seaplanes were also procured. During the same year the Bulgarian airplane construction specialist Atanas Grigorov (who obtained his qualification at the "Albatroswerke – Berlin") assembled a Friedrichshafen FF.33e seaplane from spares, which he called the "Grigorov-1". The aircraft made several test-flights, but was damaged beyond repair by a storm in the hangar where it was stationed. Also in 1924 the Aeroplane Section was expanded to an Aeroflight Directorate still under the Ministry of Railways, Postal Service and Telegraph.

1925 saw the Potez XVII, Bristol Lucifer and Macchi 2000/18 flying boat boosting the country's aircraft inventory. The Bulgarian government invited a group of German aircraft engineers, headed by the constructor Herr Hermann Winter to help establish an aviation factory. Named The State's Aeroconstruction Atelliér or Darzhavna Aeroplanna Rabotilnitsa (DAR) the factory was initially managed by the first Bulgarian pilot to achieve an aerial victory – Mr. Marko Parvanov. The first aircraft types produced at the plant were the U-1 or "Uzounov-1" (an indigenous variant of the wartime German DFW C.V) and the DAR 2 (an indigenous variant of the German Albatros C.III of the same era). Both types became well-known and loved by the personnel of the former Air Troops and gained Bulgarian combat service experience. Development of a new type – the DAR 1 – was also started.

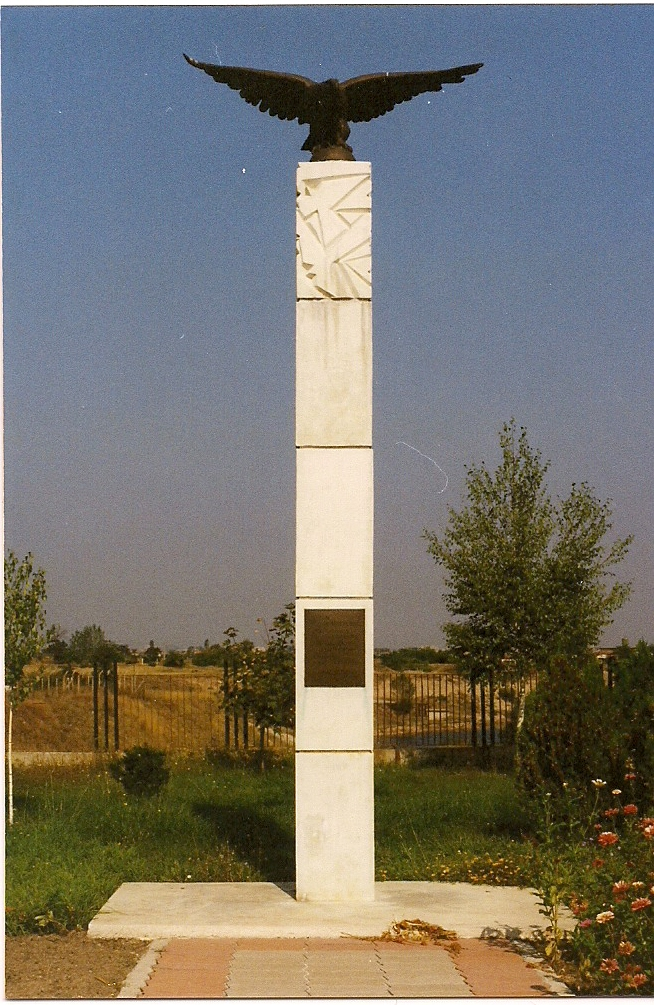
One of the eagles that decorated the entrance of Bozhurishte Air Base in the 1930s and 1940s, now preserved at the Plovdiv Museum of Aviation

During the course of 1926 the Airplane School was moved to the geographical center of the country. The town of Kazanlak was well suited, for it was far away from the Allied Control Commission. The Czechoslovak company Aero Vodochody also built an aircraft factory near that city, but its models were not up to the requirements of the Bulgarian authorities. After an unsuccessful switch to automotive production, the plant was finally sold to the Italian Caproni company. The factory became popular as "Balgarski Kaproni" or "Bulgarian Caproni". The first examples of the DAR 1 biplane were produced and entered service with the Aeroflight Directorate during 1926.

The 1927 structure of the Directorate was the following:

- A fighter yato, (Note: The Bulgarian word "yato" means a "flock of birds" and was the Bulgarian equivalent of an air force squadron at the time) flying the DAR 1
- A bomber yato, flying the DAR U-1 and DAR 2
- A reconnaissance yato, flying the Potez XVII
- A seaplane yato, flying Avro 522 floatplanes and Macchi 2000/18 flying boats
- An aeroplane school, flying the Caudron C.59, the Hanriot HD.14 and the Šmolnik Š.18 (officially known as Letov Š-18)

In 1928 the Ministry of War started the ambitious 10-year program for development of the military aviation (still banned by the peace treaty). According to the plan the following structure had to be achieved:

- 4 army fighter orlyaks, (Note: The Bulgarian word "orlyak" means an "Air Group") each made of two yatos, or overall 8 yatos flying 96 fighter planes
- 4 army reconnaissance orlyaks, each made of two yatos, or overall 8 yatos flying 96 reconnaissance planes
- 18 divisionary reconnaissance yatos, basically air support aviation, each flying 12 planes or 216 planes altogether
- Strike Aviation Brigade with:
  - Fighter Orlyak of 48 machines
  - Bomber Orlyak of 36 machines
  - Reconnaissance Orlyak of 2 machines
- Maritime Orlyak
  - 2 seaplane fighter yatos, flying 24 fighters
  - 2 seaplane bomber yatos, flying 18 bombers

In 1931 Bulgaria signed the Warsaw Treaty, concerning international civil air activities and the country was assigned the new civil registration – LZ-??? (the latter three signs being a combination of capital letters). In 1933 the Bulgarian Council of Ministers approved the following wartime order of battle of the aviation:

- a mixed orlyak of:
  - a fighter yato
  - a bomber yato
  - a reconnaissance yato
  - a liaison and photographic survey yato
- a maritime yato
- a training orlyak
- a Pilot School at Kazanlak airfield
- a balloon company (which was never actually created, as the balloon was considered obsolete for military purposes at the time).

In 1934 the Aviation Regiment was renamed His Majesty's Air Troops, comprising a headquarters, with two army orlyaks (based at Bozhurishte and Plovdiv airfields), a training orlyak (in Plovdiv), a maritime yato (at NAS Chaika, Varna) and additional operational support units. Colonel Ivan Mikhailov was appointed the first chief of the air force with Lieutenant-Colonel Georgi Vasilev appointed as his Deputy.

In late 1930s Bulgaria started acquiring Polish and German aircraft.

=== Years of Rebirth (1937–1939) ===
Insignia from 1937 to 1941, also the Medal of Bravery

In 1936 Bulgaria ordered 14 PZL P.24B fighters and 12 PZL.43 light bombers from Poland, which due to the Spanish Civil War could not be delivered by sea and were instead shipped delayed by rail. The first aircraft entered service in the summer of 1937. The reestablished air force was satisfied with the performance of new planes and in 1938, a second order was placed for 42 PZL.43A light bombers and 12 PZL P.24F fighters, which differed from the earlier versions in having more powerful engines, stronger armament and other improvements.

Before the arrival of Polish aircraft, the first combat aircraft that entered Bulgarian service in 1937 were 12 Arado Ar 65 fighters, 12 Heinkel He 51 fighters, 12 Dornier Do 11 bombers and 12 Heinkel He 45B reconnaissance aircraft. These machines were donated personally to Tsar Boris III by Hermann Göring.

In 1937, during the traditional military parade of St. George's Day (National Day of Bravery and of the patron-saint of the Bulgarian Armed Forces), military aircraft officially debuted as a part of the armed forces after a nearly two-decade hiatus. A month later Boris III himself presented the Bulgarian air regiments with their new combat flags at an official ceremony at Vrazhdebna Airfield.

When the Third Reich occupied Czechoslovakia in 1938, the Czechoslovak air force was broken up. Bulgaria used the opportunity to acquire large numbers of ex-Czechoslovak aircraft from the Germans at a bargain price. Bulgaria purchased 78 Avia B-534 biplane fighters, 32 Avia B-71 twin-engine bombers (a license version of the Soviet SB bomber), 12 Bloch MB.200 twin-engine bombers, 62 Letov Š-328 reconnaissance aircraft and 28 Avia Bs.122 trainers. Deliveries of the second batch of Polish orders started in early 1939, with 33 PZL.43A light bombers and 8 PZL P.24F fighters delivered before the German-Soviet Invasion of Poland stopped deliveries (although two more PZL.43A were delivered by the Germans later). In less than 3 years the Air Force inventory had grown up to 478 aircraft of which 135 were of Bulgarian construction.

In the years 1938-1939, according to the design and with the support of the Polish PZL, a modern DSF factory was built in Lovech, where new PZL P.24J fighters were to be built under license. However, these plans were thwarted by the outbreak of World War II and the factory produced mainly training planes, including the most-produced Bulgarian aircraft, the Laz-7.

=== World War II (1939–1945) ===
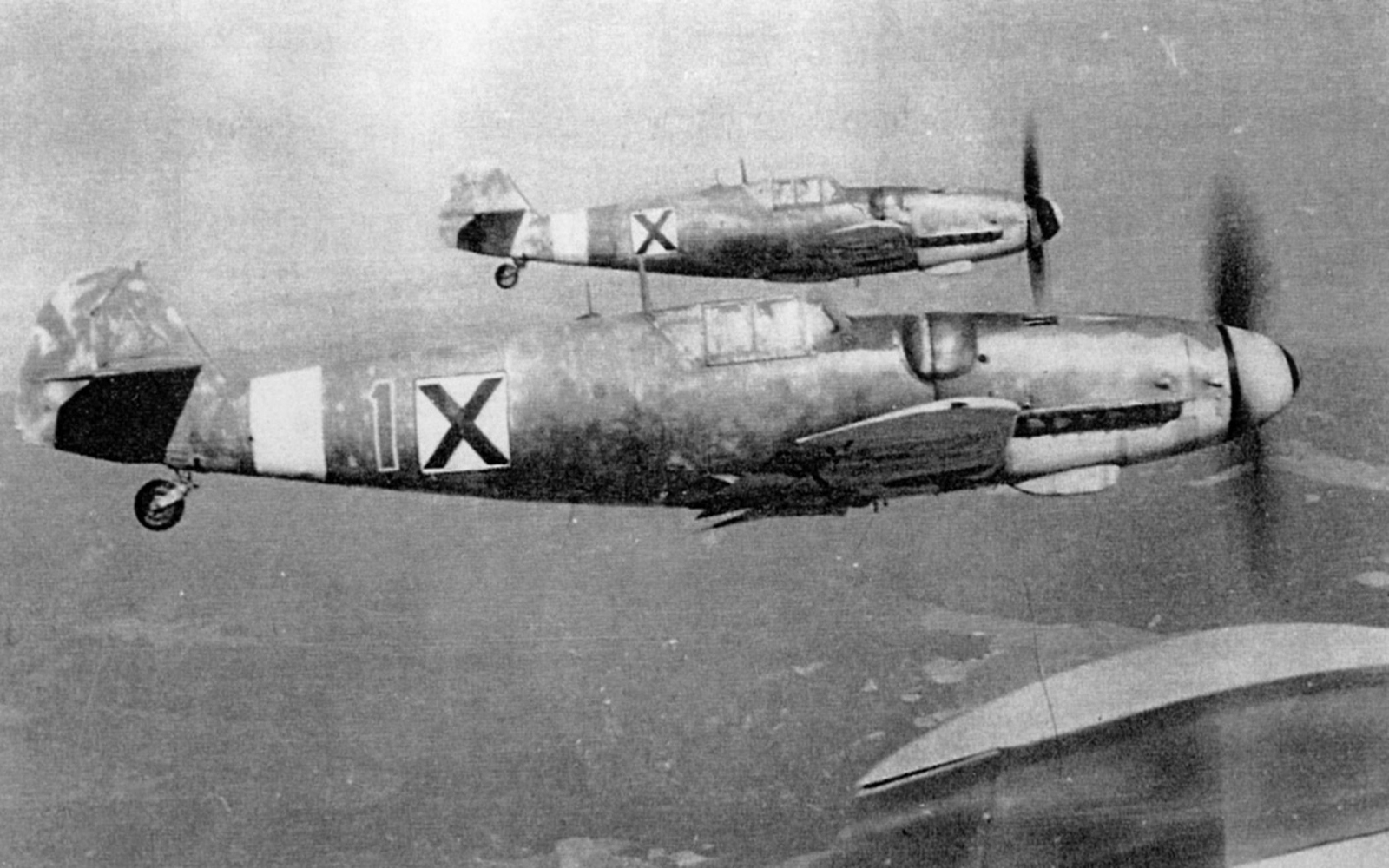
Bulgarian Messerschmitt Bf 109s in 1944.

At the beginning of World War II, the combat air fleet comprised 374 machines in various roles. In addition orders were placed for 10 Messerschmitt Bf 109E-4 fighters, 11 Dornier Do 17M/P bombers, 6 Messerschmitt Bf 108 light liaison and utility aircraft, 24 Arado Ar 96B-2 and 14 Bücker-Bestmann Bü 131 trainers.

The Air Force order of battle comprised the 1st, 2nd, 3rd and 4th Army Aviation Orlyaks (Army Air Groups or air regiments), each attached to the correspondingly-numbered field army. Each orlyak had a fighter, a line bomber and two reconnaissance yatos (squadrons). There was also an Independent Aviation corps, which combined the 5th Bomber and 6th Fighter Regiments. The training units consisted of the "Junker" School Orlyak at Vrazhdebna airfield, the 2nd Training Orlyak at Telish airfield (called the Blind Flying Training School) and the 3rd Training Orlyak at Stara Zagora airfield. In 1940, the Bulgarian aviation industry provided the air force with 42 DAR 9 Siniger and 45 Kaproni-Bulgarski KB-5 Chuchuliga aircraft, along with preparing for serial production of the KB-6 – Bulgaria's first twin-engined aircraft. At year's end, the Bulgarians had 595 aircraft (of which 258 were combat aircraft) and 10,287 personnel.

Insignia from 1941 to 1944

On 1 March 1941, the Tsardom of Bulgaria signed the Tripartite Pact, becoming a formal ally of Germany. Under the treaty, Bulgaria allowed the use of its territory as a staging point for the invasion of Yugoslavia and Greece and some minor logistical support.

Despite the impressive looking inventory, Bulgaria's fighter force in January 1941 consisted of only 91 machines, with just 18 of them modern Bf 109E monoplanes. A further 11 were PZL P.24B fighters, and the remainder were obsolete Avia B-534 biplanes. The ground-based air defenses were made up of only 8 88 mm (3.5 in) and 6 20 mm (0.79 in) AA guns. To help its new ally the 12th Army of the Wehrmacht offered support with its aircraft and air defence assets and provided 8 Freya-type radars dispersed throughout the country. A dispersed observation and reporting system was gradually developed.

The first air strike against Bulgarian targets was carried out by 4 Yugoslav Dornier Do 17 Kb-1 on 6 April 1941 on the city of Kyustendil and its railway station killing 47 and injuring 95, mostly civilians. The air strikes intensified in the following days; British Royal Air Force units based in Greece participated in the attacks as well. At the end of April, the 2nd and 5th Bulgarian armies occupied Greek and Yugoslav territories according to an agreement with the Third Reich. As a part of the joint armed forces' effort on 26 June 1941 6 Avia B.71 and 9 Dornier Do 17M bombers were transferred to the Badem Chiflik airfield near Kavala (in Greece). They were tasked with anti-submarine patrols and air support for Italian shipping over the adjacent area of the Aegean Sea. In addition 9 Letov Š.328s based in Badem Chiflik provided the ground troops with air reconnaissance. At the Black Sea shores the "Galata" Fighter Orlyak was established at NAS Chaika, Varna, with the 10 Bf 109E-4s and 6 Avia B-534s. The S.328s were also used for anti-submarine patrols over the Black Sea, flying out of the Sarafovo and Balchik airfields. At the end of 1941 the inventory of His Majesty's Air Troops consisted of 609 aircraft of 40 different types.

On 22 June 1941, Germany invaded the Soviet Union, but Bulgaria refused to take part, although it did declare war with Great Britain and the United States of America in December 1941. Bulgaria's inaction against the Soviet Union meant that supplies of German aircraft slowed to a trickle, with only four aircraft delivered from January to September 1942.

The war declared by the Tsardom of Bulgaria against the US and Great Britain was a tragedy for the little country. The city of Sofia and Bulgarian towns and villages were hit by air strikes in late 1943 and in 1944. In all, 187 inhabited places were attacked, 45,000 destructive and incendiary bombs were dropped. There were about 2,000 casualties, and about 4700 wounded, 12,000 damaged or ruined buildings and the total losses were estimated at nearly 24 billion dollars. For the citizens of Sofia, the "Black" days were 14 and 24 November, 10 and 20 December 1943, and 10 January and 16, 24, 30 March and 17 April 1944 when large formations of B-17 and B-24 bombers ruined parts of the capital city including the central area. The Bulgarians also see successes. On 1 August 1943, an armada of 177 American Consolidated B-24 Liberator bombers flew over several Balkan countries their way to bomb "the taproot of German might", the giant oil refineries at Ploiești, Romania. Termed Operation Tidal Wave, the aircraft flew over Bulgarian territory and Bulgarian fighter pilots Sub-lieutenant Peter Bochev (5 victories), Captain Tschudomir Toplodolski (4 victories), Lieutenant Stoyan Stoyanov (5 victories) and Sublieutenant Hristo Krastev (1 victory) gained their first victories on the bombers.

In total, about 23,000 enemy sorties were registered over Bulgaria in the years 1943–1944. Bulgarian pilots fought an enemy outnumbering them by 10 to 50 times. Some of the best pilots were Lieutenant Stoyanov, Captain Toplodolski, and Sub-Lieutenants Bochev, Cvetkov, and Damev. 19 Bulgarian pilots died in this war against the Allies. The Allies lost 60 planes, shot down by Bulgarian fighters and about 430 airmen, 325 of which were taken as POWs.

=== Reestablishment under the Communist government ===
Insignia from 1945 to 1948

Insignia from 1949 to 1992

The Bulgarian Air Force, along with other branches of the Sovietized Bulgarian People's Army, adopted the doctrine of the Soviet deep battle during the Cold War. The force expanded rapidly with deliveries of different types of combat aircraft. The first shipments of Soviet equipment arrived immediately after the end of World War II, mostly consisting of propeller-driven aircraft, such as the Ilyushin Il-2 (120 Il-2 and 10 Il-2U), the Ilyushin Il-10 and the Tupolev Tu-2. By 1954, these types were being withdrawn from service, as the Korean War marked the beginning of the jet fighter era and in 1955 a new wave of deliveries began, starting with the Mikoyan-Gurevich MiG-15. Later additions included Mikoyan-Gurevich MiG-17 and MiG-19 fighters and Ilyushin Il-28 bombers, as well as the Mil Mi-1, the first helicopter. These aircraft were withdrawn in the 1970s, when the last wave of modernization began.

In June 1979, the Mil Mi-24 Hind entered service through a significant re-equipment program and boosted the capabilities of the BAF. The Sukhoi Su-22 and Su-25 entered service in 1988 in the strike and reconnaissance role. 40 Su-25K/KUBs and 21 Su-22M4/UM-3s were delivered.

=== After the Cold War (1989–2004) ===
In 1993, the air regiments in Bezmer and Sadovo were experimentally transformed into "air bases" with the merger of the air regiments with the aviation-technical and airfield service battalions, that were independent from them. Around 1995 – 1996 all the air regiments were transformed into air bases (brigade equivalents) and two main commands were formed: Air Defence Command (Командване за противовъздушна отбрана), merging the two air defence divisions and the Tactical Aviation Command (Командване Тактическа Авиация), by reorganisation of the 10th Composite Aviation Corps, called and including into it the newly transformed into air bases training regiments in Shtraklevo and Kamenets. The regiment in Dolna Mitropoliya was disbanded.

With the end of the Cold War, Bulgaria's air force was reduced to 226 aircraft. All MiG-25 fighters were grounded in 1991 and a large number of early MiG-21 variants were withdrawn from service and scrapped, with armament from the trainers for the MiG-21 and MiG-23 also being removed. In 1998, four air bases were closed down: Gabrovnitsa Air Base, Balchik Air Base, Uzundzhovo Air Base and Shtraklevo Air Base. In 2000, further air bases were closed, with the Stara Zagora (which operated Mi-24s) Air Base being suspended. Then, in 2001 three more bases were closed down: Dobrich Air Base, Ravnets Air Base and Cheshnegirovo Air Base. In 2003, Dobroslavtsi Air Base was also closed down and the MiG-23s were withdrawn from service as they were more expensive to run than the MiG-21s. In February 2004 the Su-22s, which were stationed first in Dobrich then in Bezmer, were withdrawn.

=== Twenty-first century ===
Since the early 2000s, Bulgaria has been actively trying to restructure its armed forces as a whole and a lot of attention has been placed on keeping the aging Soviet-era aircraft operational. In 2015, the last of the MiG-21s were put out of service, and the attack & defence branches of the Bulgarian Air Force relied solely on MiG-29s. About 16 MiG-29 fighters were modernised in order to meet NATO standards. In January 2011, the Bulgarian Ministry of Defence issued a Request for Information (RFI) regarding the acquisition of eight multi-role fighters. The main competitors were expected to be the Eurofighter Typhoon, Dassault Rafale, Saab JAS 39 Gripen, Mikoyan MiG-29, MiG-35, CAC/PAC JF-17 Thunder, Lockheed Martin F-16, and McDonnell Douglas F/A-18 Hornet. On 9 March 2011, the Swedish Government submitted its response to the RFI containing eight new Gripen C/D fighters. The Ministry of Defence extended the time limit for submittal of responses by two months, due to the lack of responses from the other competitors.

Modern European transport helicopters were ordered and purchased in 2005, and, consequently, 12 Eurocopter Cougar helicopters (8 to provide transport & 4 CSAR) joined the fleet. For the Navy three Eurocopter Panther were ordered and have been delivered.

In 2006, the Bulgarian government signed a contract with Alenia Aeronautica for the delivery of five C-27J Spartan transport aircraft in order to replace the older Soviet An-24 & An-26. The first Spartan arrived in 2007. Subsequently, the contract changed to the delivery of only three aircraft, and the final one arrived on 31 March 2011.

On 11 November 2016, the Bulgarian government signed a 21.8-million-euro contract for 10 MiG-29 engines (four new & six repaired), with the first pair scheduled to arrive by April 2017. The deal would eventually bring the number of active service MiG-29 aircraft from 9 to 14, as Bulgaria also announced it was looking to overhaul the fleet and buy eight new or second-hand fighter jets during the coming year.

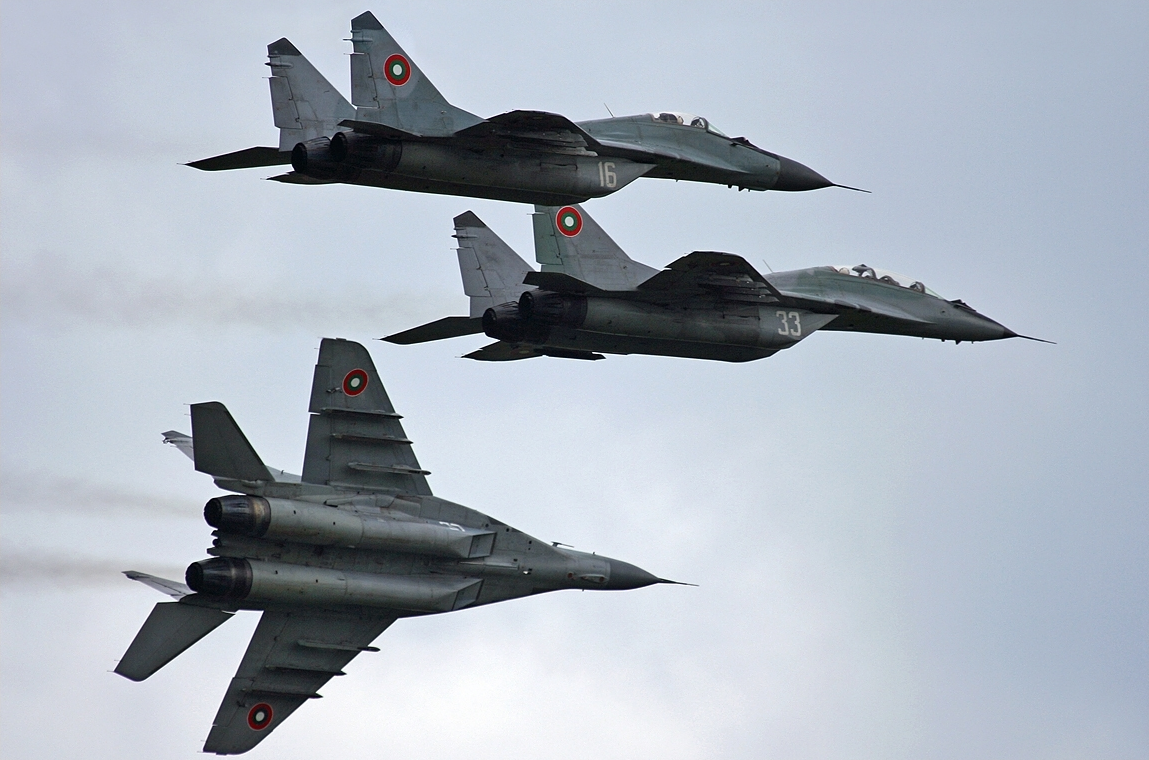
A squadron of MiG-29 Fulcrum-A

In 2016, Bulgaria's government announced the Saab JAS 39 Gripen as the preferred candidate in the country's new combat aircraft competition. In 2016, Sofia issued a request for proposals for the purchase of eight multirole fighters to be delivered by 2020. However, a new government postponed plans of acquiring new aircraft in May 2017.

In October 2018, potential suppliers responded to a renewed tender for aircraft, consisting of new F-16C/D Block 70 aircraft from Lockheed Martin, new F/A-18E/F Super Hornet aircraft from Boeing, used Eurofighter Typhoon aircraft from Italy, and used Saab JAS 39 Gripen C/D from Sweden. France, Germany, Israel, and Portugal did not respond to requests for used Eurofighter Typhoons and F-16 variants.

On 16 January 2019, the Bulgarian parliament approved the government's proposal to start negotiations with the US to purchase F-16C/D Block 70 aircraft. On 3 June 2019, the U.S. State Department approved the possible sale of eight F-16 aircraft to Bulgaria. The cost of the contract was estimated at $1.67 billion. The deal was vetoed by the Bulgarian President, Rumen Radev on 23 July 2019, citing the need to find a broader consensus for the deal, sending the deal back to parliament, but, on 26 July, the deal was again approved by parliament, overruling the veto, and, this time, was approved by Radev. In April 2020, Lockheed Martin was officially ordered by the U.S. government to produce F-16s for Bulgaria, which are estimated to be completed in 2027.

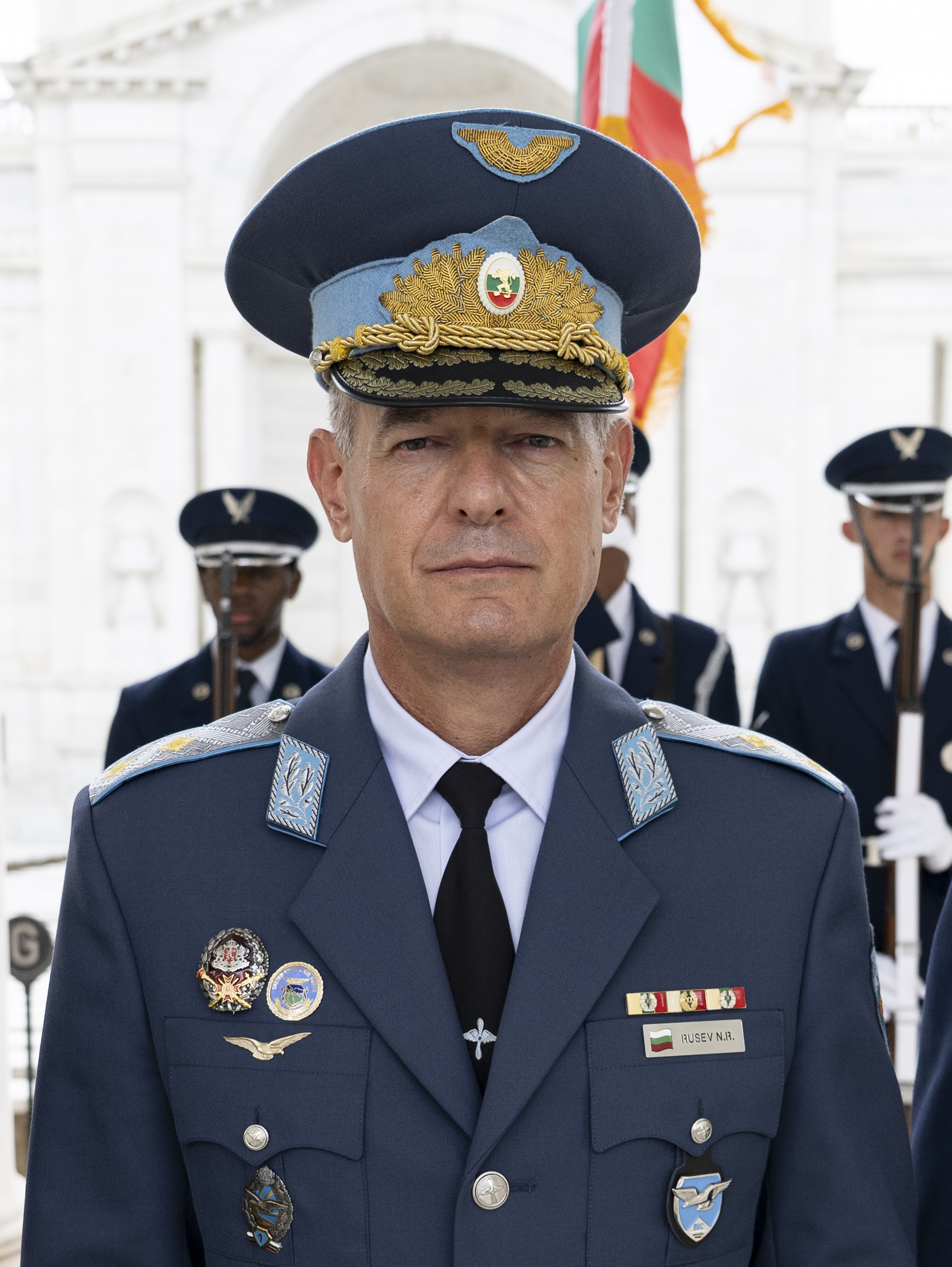
Air Force Commander of Bulgaria, Major General Nikolay Rusev in 2026

The 2022 Russian invasion of Ukraine began on February 22, 2022. In April 2022, it appears that Bulgaria's 14 Sukhoi Su-25 "Frogfoot" aircraft were purchased by a European entity, and gifted to Ukraine. In September 2022, Bulgaria’s caretaker government announced that they would purchase another eight fighter aircraft. Thus, Bulgaria will gradually receive sixteen F-16s. In November 2022, Bulgaria reportedly finalized an agreement to procure eight F-16s. This deal is aimed at replacing the country's aging MiG-29s, which are scheduled for retirement in the coming year.

== Organization 2025 ==
Bulgarian Air Force locations 2018:
MiG-29A/UB & F-16V Viper Su-25K/UBK Helicopters other flying units
Command and Control centres Air defence missile units other sites

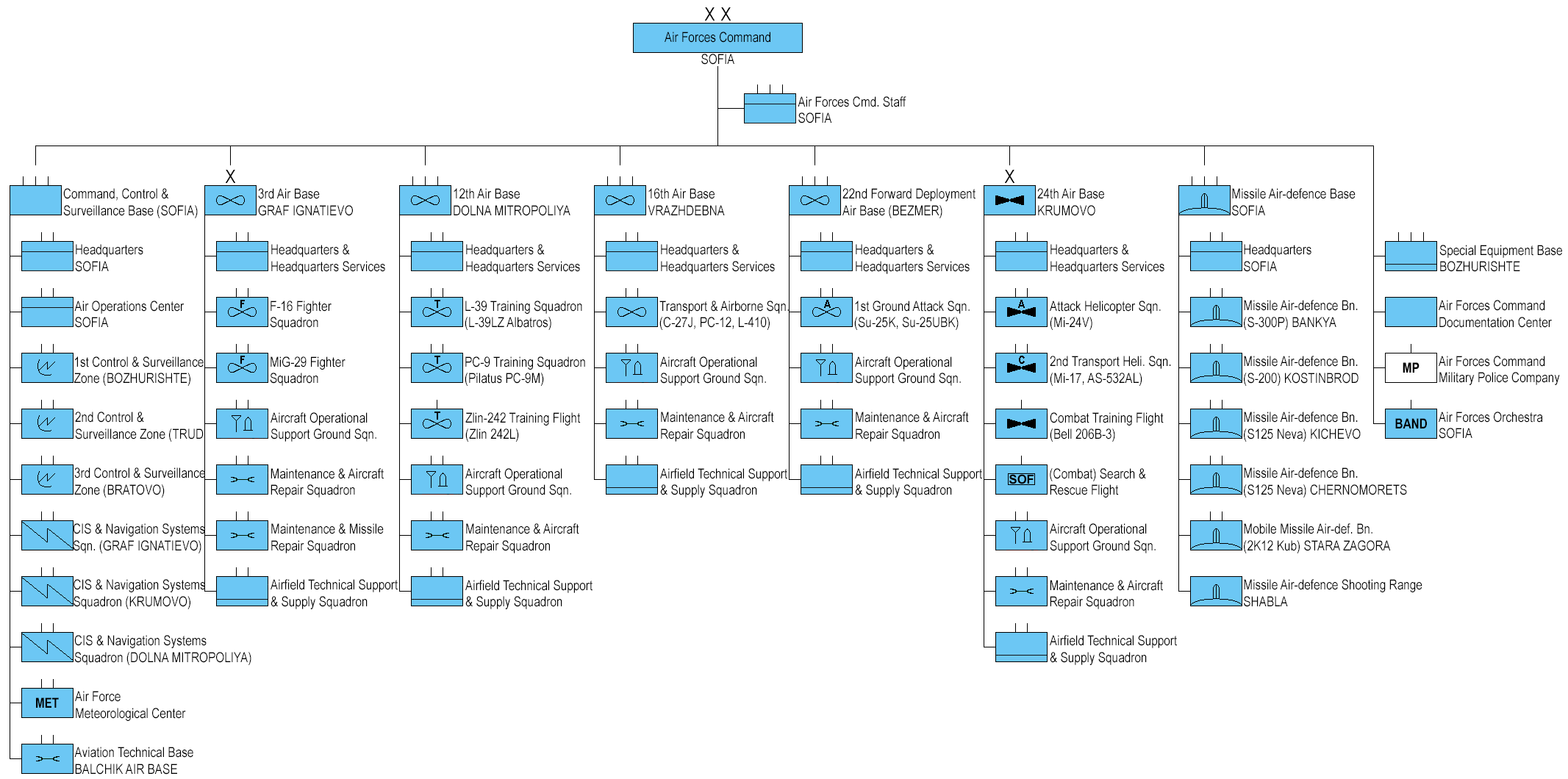
Bulgarian Air Forces organization 2025 (click to enlarge)

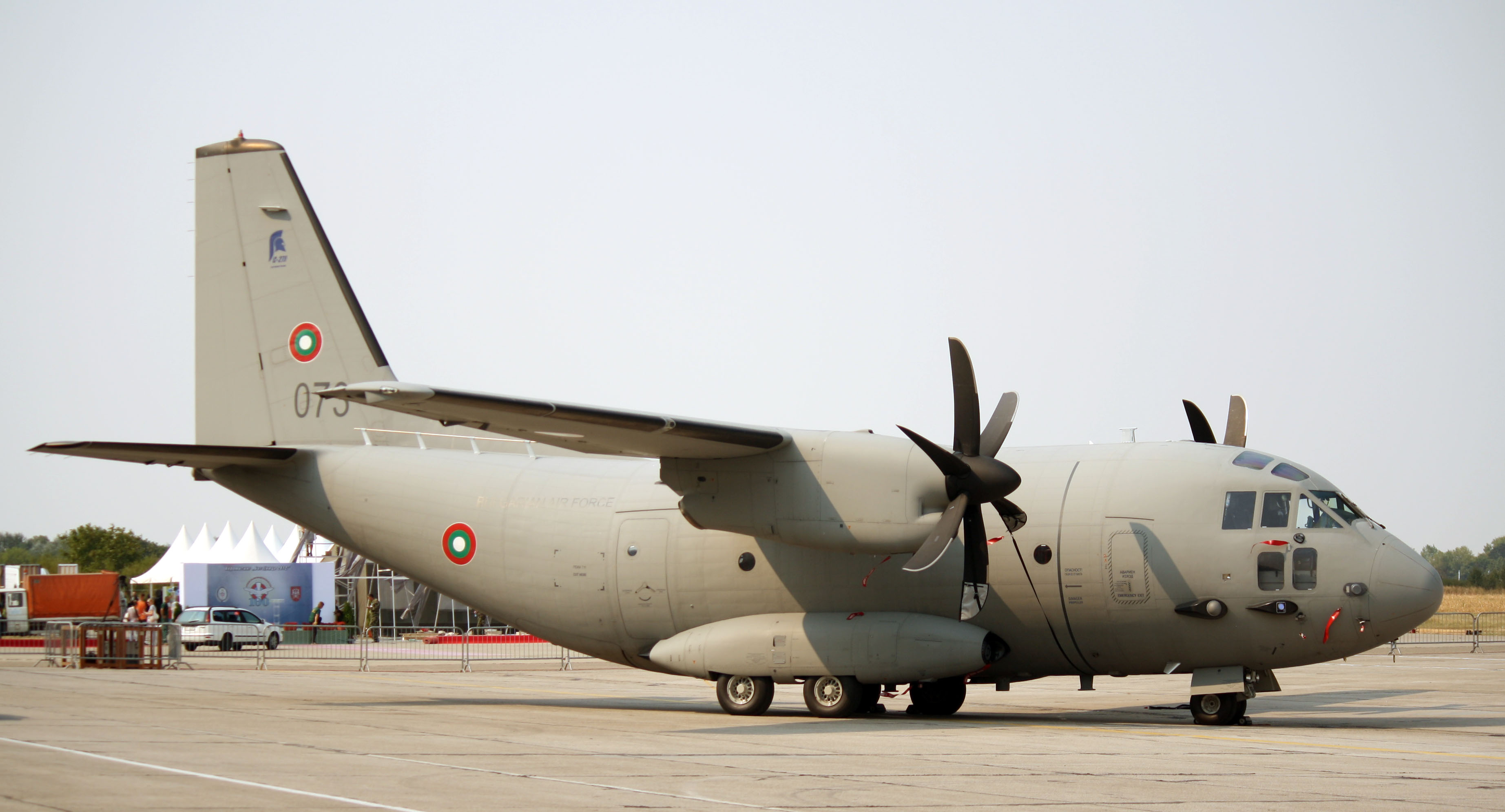
C-27J Spartan Bulgarian Air Force

- Joint Forces Command, Sofia
  - Military Command Center, Sofia
    - Air Sovereignty Operations Center, Sofia, reports to NATO's Integrated Air Defense System CAOC Torrejón in Spain
  - Air Forces Command, Sofia
    - Command, Control and Surveillance Base (III)
      - Headquarters
      - 1st Control and Surveillance Zone, Bozhurishte, Sofia Province
      - 2nd Control and Surveillance Zone, Trud, Plovdiv Province
      - 3rd Control and Surveillance Zone, Bratovo, Burgas Province
      - CIS and Navigation Systems Squadron, Graf Ignatievo Air Base
      - CIS and Navigation Systems Squadron, Krumovo Air Base
      - CIS and Navigation Systems Squadron, Dolna Mitropoliya Air Base
      - Air Force Meteorological Center
      - Aviation Technical Base, Balchik Airfield (reserve airfield, former 6th Fighter Air Base)
    - 3rd Aviation Base, Graf Ignatievo Air Base (X)
      - Headquarters and Headquarters Services
      - 1st Fighter Aviation Squadron, operating 12 × MiG-29A, 3 × MiG-29UB, being replaced by 16 × F-16V Viper
      - Aircraft Operational Support Ground Squadron
      - Maintenance and Aircraft Repair Squadron
      - Maintenance and Missile Repair Squadron
      - Airfield Technical Support and Supply Squadron
      - separate services and sections
    - 24th Aviation Base, Krumovo Air Base (X)
      - Headquarters and Headquarters Services
      - Attack Helicopter Squadron, operating 4x Mi-24V
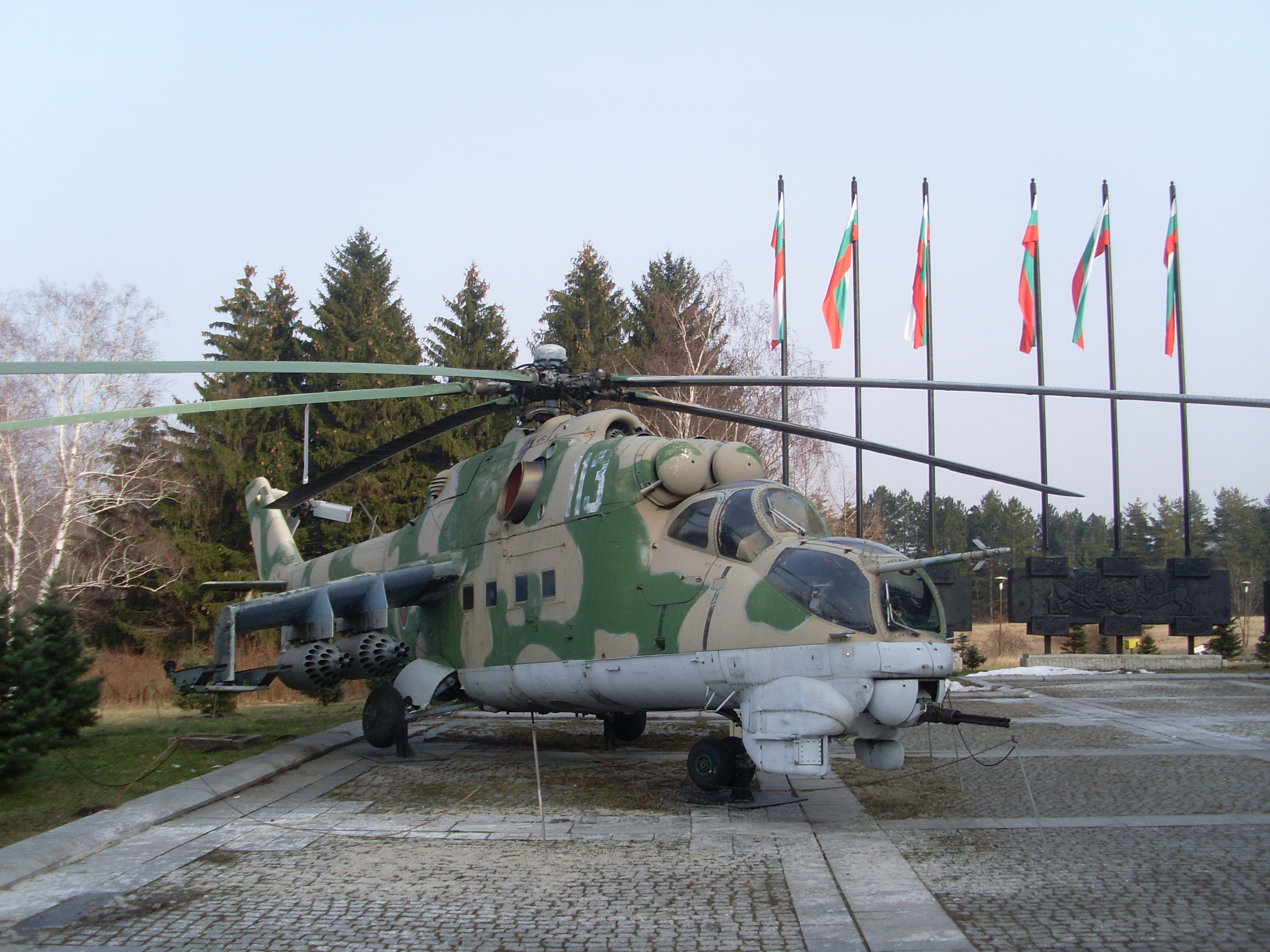
        Bulgarian Mi-24
      - 2nd Transport Helicopter Squadron, operating 8x Eurocopter Cougar TTH, 4x Eurocopter Cougar CSAR, 2x Mi-17
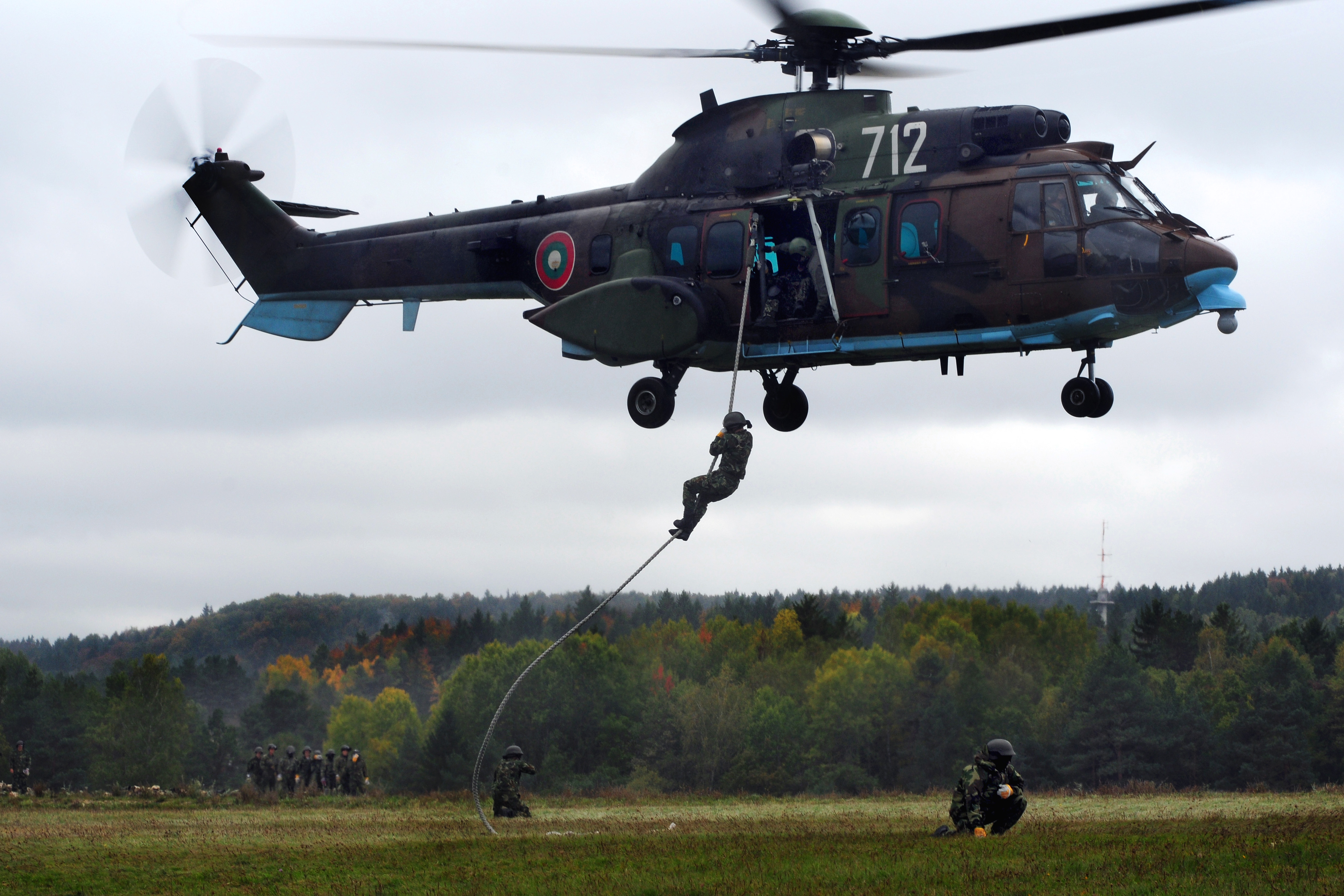
        Bulgarian Cougar
      - Combat Training Flight, operating 6x Bell 206B-3
      - (Combat) Search and Rescue Flight, a company of infantrymen and medics
      - Aircraft Operational Support Ground Squadron
      - Maintenance and Aircraft Repair Squadron
      - Airfield Technical Support and Supply Squadron
      - separate services and sections
    - (22nd) Forward Deployment Air Base Bezmer (III)
      - Headquarters and Headquarters Services
      - 1st Ground Attack Aviation Squadron, operating 5x Su-25K, 2x Su-25UBK
      - Aircraft Operational Support Ground Squadron
      - Maintenance and Aircraft Repair Squadron
      - Airfield Technical Support and Supply Squadron
      - separate services and sections
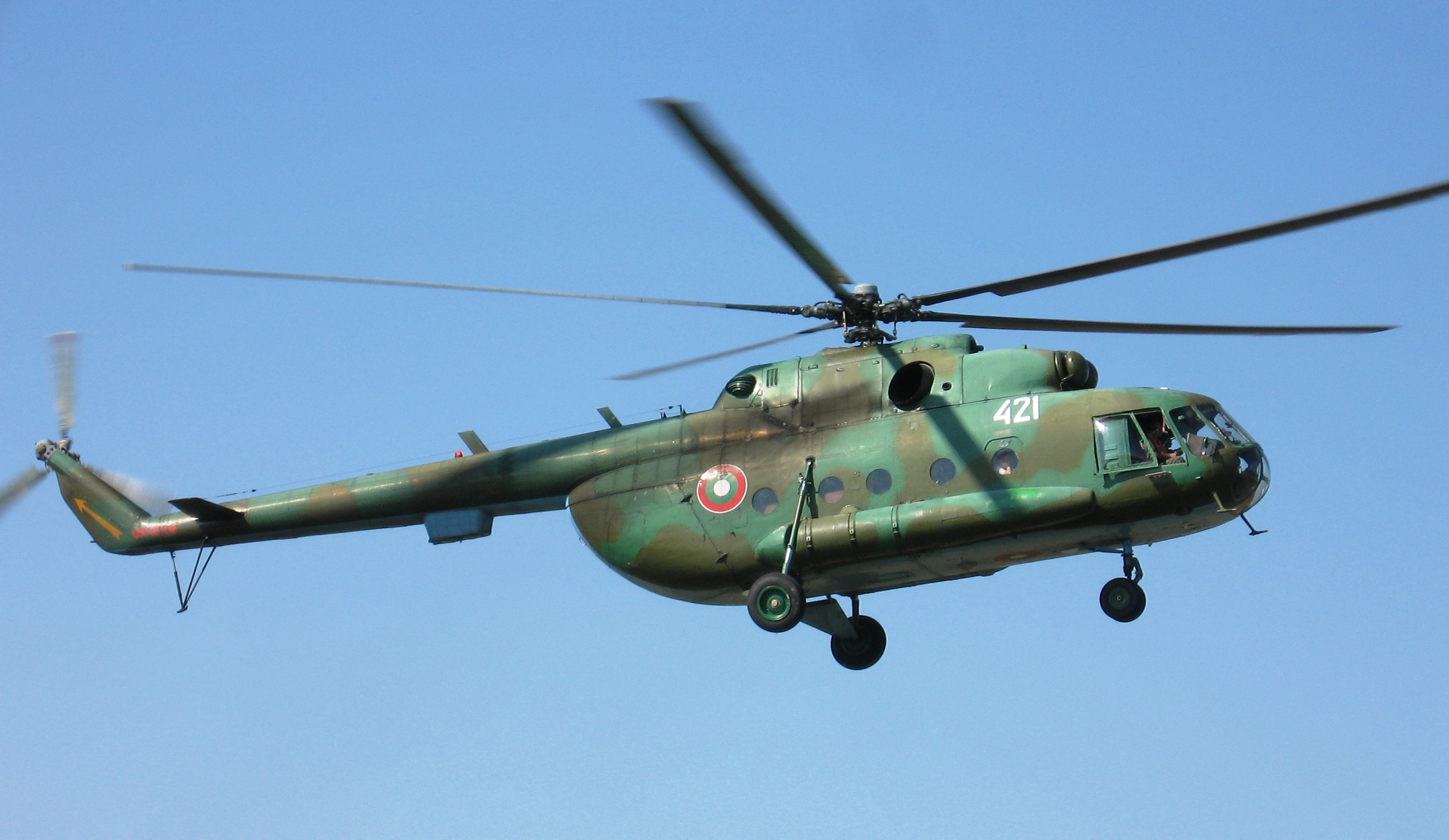
        Bulgarian Mi-17
    - 16th Aviation Base, Vrazhdebna Air Base (III)
      - Headquarters and Headquarters Services
      - Transport and Airborne Landing Aviation Squadron, operating 3x C-27J, 1x Pilatus PC-12, 2x Let L-410UVP-E Turbolet, 1x An-30 (status unclear), 1x An-2 (unclear if under the 16th AB)
      - Aircraft Operational Support Ground Squadron
      - Maintenance and Aircraft Repair Squadron
      - Airfield Technical Support and Supply Squadron
      - separate services and sections
    - 12th Aviation Base, at Dolna Mitropoliya Air Base (III) (previously 12th Training Air Group under the 3rd Aviation Base. Since December 1, 2021 a separate formation of army regiment equivalent.)
      - Headquarters and Headquarters Services
      - Training Aviation Squadron L-39, operating 5x Aero L-39LZ Albatros
      - Training Aviation Squadron PC-9, operating 6x Pilatus PC-9M
      - Training Aviation Flight Zlin-242, operating 2x Zlin 242L
      - Aircraft Operational Support Ground Squadron
      - Maintenance and Aircraft Repair Squadron
      - Airfield Technical Support and Supply Squadron
      - separate services and sections
    - Missile Air Defence Base, Sofia (III)
      - Headquarters
      - Missile Air Defence Battalion (S-300P), Bankya
      - Missile Air Defence Battalion (S-200), Kostinbrod
      - Missile Air Defence Battalion (S125 Neva), Kichevo
      - Missile Air Defence Battalion (S125 Neva), Chernomorets
      - Mobile Missile Air Defence Battalion (2K12 Kub), Stara Zagora
      - Missile Air Defence Shooting Range, Shabla
    - Special Equipment Base (III), Bozhurishte suburb, Sofia
    - Military Police Company of the Air Forces Command
    - Air Forces Command Documentation Support Center

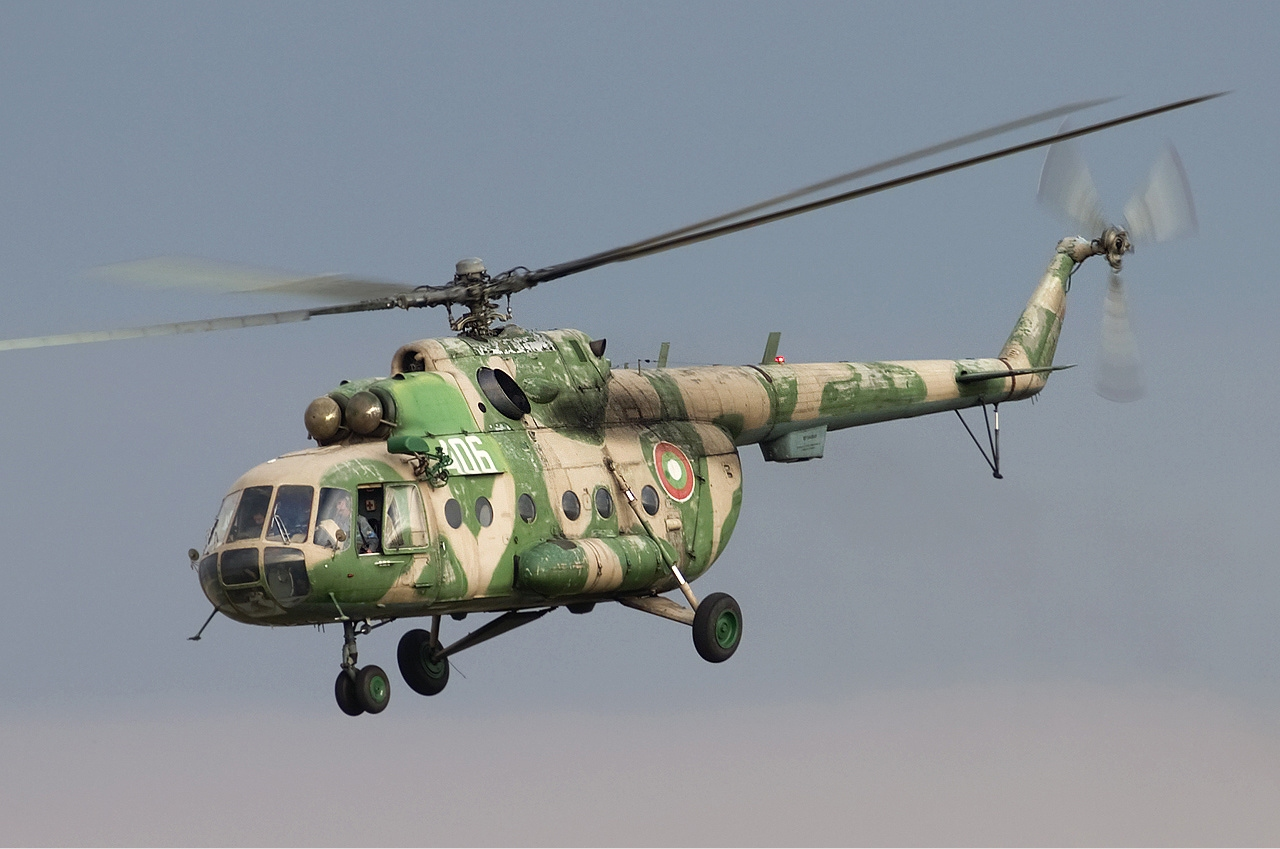
A Bulgarian Mi-17 on lift off

=== Air bases ===
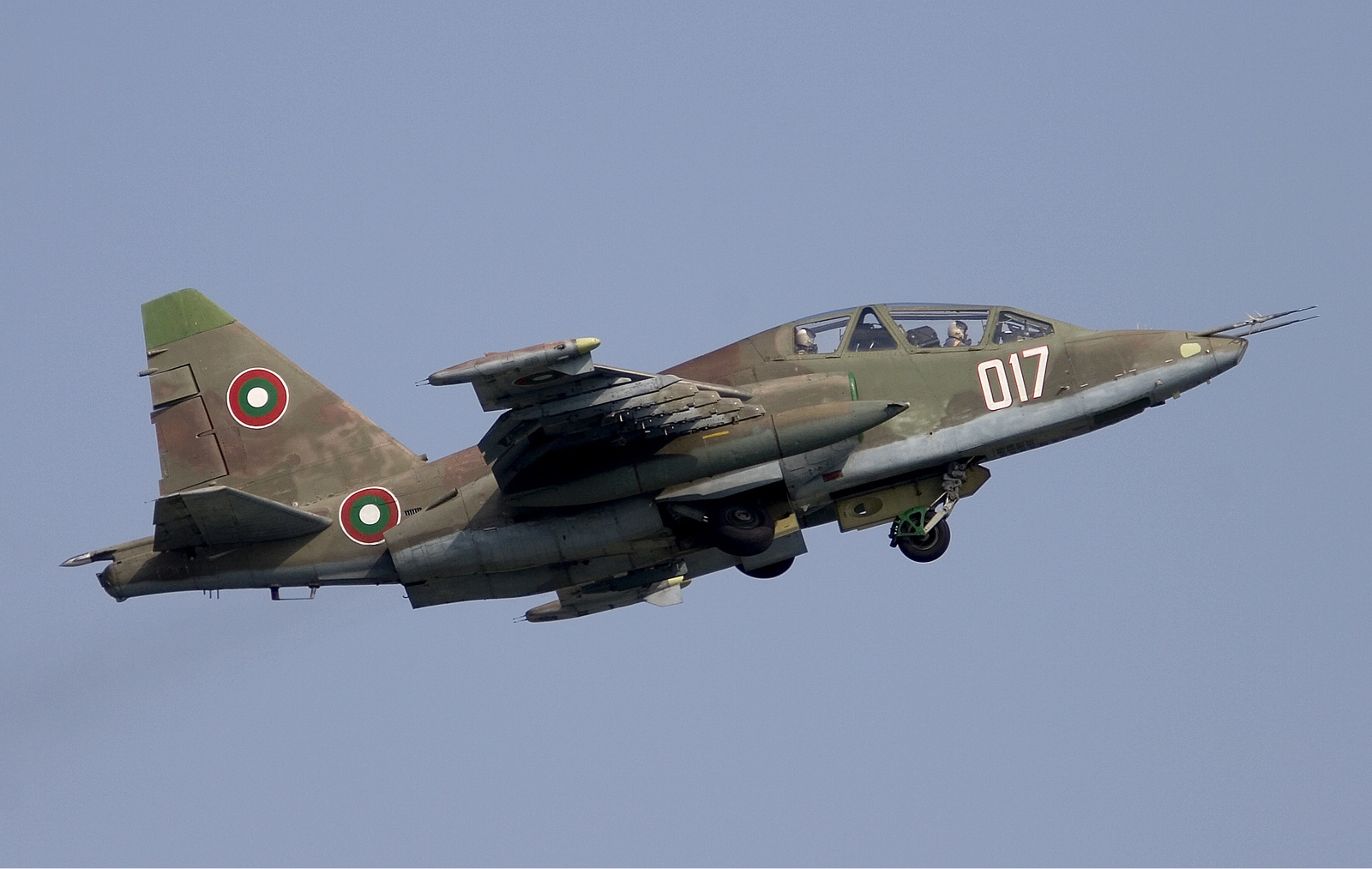
A Su-25UBK in flight

==== Active ====
- 3rd Fighter Air Base - Graf Ignatievo Air Base
- 12th Training Air Base - Dolna Mitropoliya Air Base
- 16th Transport Air Group - Vrazhdebna Air Base (military area of Sofia Airport)
- 22nd Forward Deployment Air Base - Bezmer Air Base (becoming a joint Bulgarian-American training facility)
- 24th Air Base - Krumovo Air Base (military area of Plovdiv Airport)

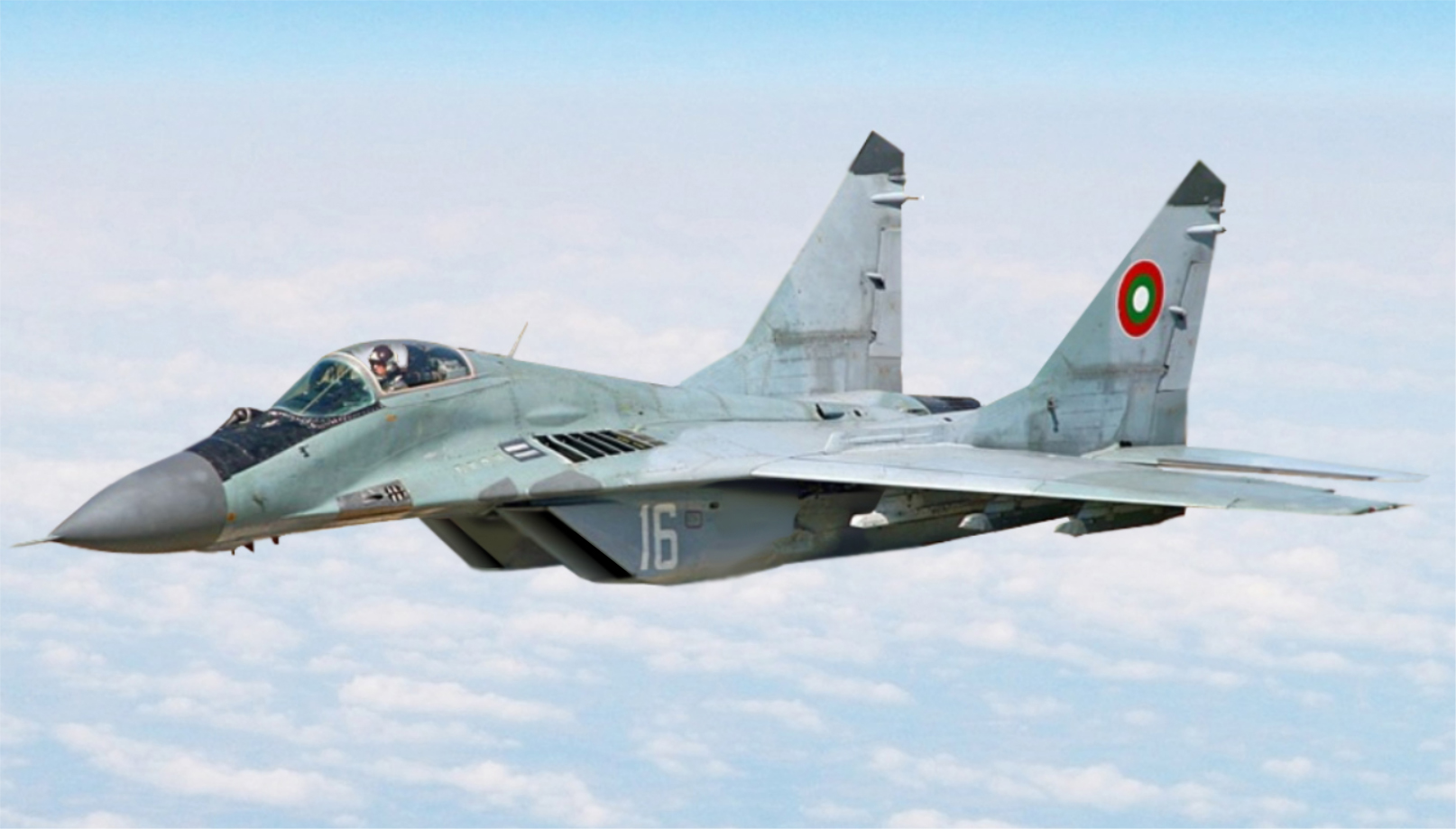
A MiG-29 9.12A in flight

==== Closed ====
- 1st Fighter Air Base - Dobroslavtsi Air Base
- 2nd Fighter Air Base - Gabrovnitsa Air Base
- 5th Fighter Air Base - Ravnets Air Base
- 6th Fighter Air Base - Balchik Air Base
- 11th Training Air Base - Shtraklevo Air Base
- 12th Training Air Base - Kamenets Air Base
- 21st Fighter Air Base - Uzundzhovo Air Base (formerly 4th FAB)
- 23rd Helicopter Air Base - Stara Zagora Air Base
- 25th Fighter-Bomber Air Base - Cheshnegirovo Air Base
- 26th Reconnaissance Air Base - Dobrich Air Base
- Bozhurishte Airfield
- The city of Plovdiv used to house the headquarters of the Tactical Aviation Command and is still a place of significance as it houses a number of logistical and operational support units of the Bulgarian Air Force.
- The city of Burgas is the place around which the 3rd Missile Air Defence Brigade of the Bulgarian Air Force is deployed.
- 63rd Independent Maritime Helicopter Air Base at Varna – Chayka Naval Air Base, which houses the Independent Maritime Helicopter Squadron.

== Aircraft ==
Except for the Navy's small helicopter fleet, the Air Force is responsible for all military aircraft in Bulgaria. The BAF plans to retire most of its Soviet-era aircraft, keeping only the Mikoyan-Gurevich MiG-29 "Fulcrum" fleet - which was modernized only recently, as well as its Mil Mi-24 gunships & Sukhoi Su-25s. The MiG-21s in service were retired on 18 December 2015. On 6 October 2020, the Bulgarian Ministry of Defence signed an order with Ukrainian state company "Ukrinmash" for the repair and refurbishment of one Antonov An-30, designed for aerial cartography, for 3.100.000 € The Ministry of Defence plans to retire the MiG-29 sometime around 2028, after the F-16s reach full operational capability.

=== Current inventory ===
Aircraft	Origin	Type	Variant	In service	Notes
Combat aircraft
F-16 Fighting Falcon	United States	Multirole fighter	F-16C Block 70	6/10	Ordered 16 aircraft in two batches. Bulgaria received its first batch of 8 aircraft between April–December 2025.
F-16 Fighting Falcon	United States	Multirole fighter	F-16D Block 70	2/6	Ordered 16 aircraft in two batches. Bulgaria received its first batch of 8 aircraft between April–December 2025.
MiG-29	Soviet Union	Multirole fighter	MiG-29 9.12A MiG-29UB	12	2 used for conversion training
Sukhoi Su-25	Soviet Union	Attack	Su-25K	5	
Transport
Pilatus PC-12	Switzerland	Transport / Utility	PC-12NG	1	
Alenia C-27J	Italy	Transport		3	
Let L-410	Czech Republic	Transport	L-410UVP-E3	2	
Antonov An-2	Soviet Union	Transport	An-2TD	1	Used for paratrooper training
Antonov An-30	Soviet Union	Surveillance	An-30B	1	Used for aerial cartography and surveillance. Currently grounded in Ukraine whilst it was undergoing repairs since 2022.
Helicopters
Bell 206	United States	Utility	206B-3	6	4 are used for rotorcraft training
Mil Mi-17	Soviet Union	Transport	Mi-17-1V	2	
Mil Mi-24	Soviet Union	Attack helicopter	Mi-24V	4	6 Mi-24D in storage
Eurocopter AS532	France	CSAR / Transport	AS532 AL	12	
Trainer aircraft
Aero L-39	Czechoslovakia	Jet trainer	L-39ZA	6	Contract was signed for overhaul and partial modernization of L-39ZA aircraft of Bulgarian Air Force by Aero Vodochody. The first two aircraft to be overhauled and upgraded were transported in January 2023, followed by two more L-39ZAs.
Sukhoi Su-25	Soviet Union	Jet trainer	Su-25UBK	2	
Pilatus PC-9	Switzerland	Trainer	PC-9M	6	
Zlin Z 42	Czech Republic	Trainer	Z 242L Zeus	4	
Cessna 172	United States	Trainer		1	Delivered October 2026
Cabri G2	France	Trainer		2	

=== NATO shared aircraft ===
Aircraft	Origin	Type	Variant	In service	Notes
Boeing C-17 Globemaster III	United States	Strategic airlifter	C-17A	3	Operated by the Heavy Airlift Wing based at Pápa Air Base, Hungary as part of NATO's shared Strategic Airlift Capability.
Northrop Grumman RQ-4 Global Hawk	United States	Reconnaissance UAV	RQ-4D Phoenix	5	Shared within NATO's Alliance Ground Surveillance program. Based at Naval Air Station Sigonella, Italy.

=== Other assets ===
Name	Origin	Type	Notes
Air defence systems
S-300	Soviet Union	Long-range surface-to-air missile	S-300PMU - 8 launchers
S-200	Soviet Union	Long-range surface-to-air missile	S-200 Angara - 12 launchers
S-75 Dvina	Soviet Union	Medium-range surface-to-air missile	S-75M3 Volhov
S-125	Soviet Union	Short-range surface-to-air missile	S-125M
2K12 Kub	Soviet Union	Short-range surface-to-air missile	2k12M Kub-M
Radars
ST-68U	Soviet Union	3D radar	Used on the S-300 system.
P-35/37MV1 Khristo	Soviet Union	2D E band/F band	P-37MV1 Bar Lock Upgrade.
P-18	Soviet Union	2D VHF Radar	2-dimensional air search radar.
P-14	Soviet Union	2D VHF Radar	2-dimensional air search radar.
Air-launched missiles
AIM-120 AMRAAM	United States	Medium-range air-to-air missile	35 AIM-120C-7/C-8 on Order.
R-27	Soviet Union	Medium-range air-to-air missile	R-27R1(AA-10 Alamo-A) R-27T1(AA-10 Alamo-B)
R-73	Soviet Union	Short-range air-to-air missile	R-73E
R-3	Soviet Union	Short-range air-to-air missile	AA-2A Atoll-A AA-2A Atoll-D
AIM-9 Sidewinder	United States	Short-range air-to-air missile	44 AIM-9X Block II on Order.
Kh-29	Soviet Union	Air-to-surface missile	Kh-29L
Kh-25	Soviet Union	Air-to-surface missile	Kh-25L
Bombs/Guidance kit
GBU-39	United States	Glide bomb	GBU-39/B 56 on order.
JDAM	United States	Guidance kit	In use with GBU-38 and GBU-54 27 on order.
GBU-49	United States	Guidance kit	27 GBU-49 Enhanced Paveway II kits on order

== Potential/future acquisitions ==
Model	Origin	Type	Quantity	Notes
Second fighter squadron	Unknown	Multirole fighter	8-16	Bulgaria is considering acquiring a second modern fourth or fifth-generation fighter squadron after the initial acquisition program of 16 F-16V is completed.
Ground attack/light combat/trainer replacement	Unknown	Attack/Jet trainer	Unknown	Bulgaria is considering the acquisition of KAI F/A-50 Golden Eagle aircraft as a replacement for its fleet of L-39 and Su-25s.
New attack helicopter	Unknown	Attack helicopter	Unknown	New attack helicopters will be acquired as part of modernization program as replacement of Mil Mi-24 helicopters.
New small transport plane	Czech Republic	Transport	Unknown	New variant of Let L-410 aircraft L-410NG will be acquired in the future. Remaining aircraft will be upgraded minimum to the level of L-410UVP-E20.
GM400α	France	Long-range 3D AESA radar	5 GM400α Stationary & 2 GM400α Mobile	The French Thales Defense and Security was chosen for the acquisition of new 3D early warning radars. 5 GM400α stationary & 2 GM400α mobile systems will be used by the Bulgarian Air Force. The deal was approved by the Bulgarian parliament on November 26, 2025. The competition for the radars has been withdrawn. The deal for seven radars, capped at 195 million Euro, will be signed by the Bulgarian and French government, the Bulgarian partner on the French side will not be the manufacturer, but the Direction générale de l'armement and will be partially financed through the Security Action for Europe financial instrument. The first three radars will be delivered in August, September and December 2027 and the other four will follow until the end of 2029. These new radars will replace the obsolete P-18 and P-37 currently in service.
IRIS-T SL	Germany	Medium-range surface-to-air missile	1 SLM system ordered & 5 SLM systems approved	New surface-to-air missile systems to replace older S-200 & S-300 systems. In 2024, the Bulgarian government signed an order for one medium range IRIS-T SLM system comprising three fire units, radar and command vehicles for 179 million Euro to be delivered by the end of 2027. Along with the order came the option of additional five SLM systems and one long range SLX system. On October 14, 2026, the Bulgarian government approved the purchase of the optional five SLM systems by amending the total contract value including the first SLM system to 1.139 billion Euro to be financed through the Security Action for Europe program. The government has identified in its armed forces modernization program a requirement for an additional two medium range systems and two more long range systems. Ordered 1 SLM system in 2024 with an option for additional 5 systems and 1 SLX system.Approved purchase of 5 SLM systems.
Brigade air defence System (SHORAD)	Unknown	Short range air defense	Unknown(2-4 Battalions)	
Unmanned combat aerial vehicles	Unknown	Medium-altitude long-endurance UAV	8-24	To be used by the Bulgarian Air Force.
New anti-drone systems	Unknown	Anti drone system	Unknown	Bulgaria plans to acquire anti-drone systems through NATO.
AIM-120 AMRAAM	United States	Medium-range air-to-air missile	Unknown	Bulgaria is preparing a new contract for additional missiles.
AIM-9 Sidewinder	United States	Short-range air-to-air missile	Unknown	Bulgaria is preparing a new contract for additional missiles.
Aerial firefighting equipment	Unknown	Aerial firefighting	Unknown	Bulgarian Presidency suggests acquiring MAFFS II for C27J Spartan, additional C27J and AT-802F Fire Boss.

== Ranks ==
=== Commissioned officers ===
The rank insignia of commissioned officers.

NATO code	OF-10	OF-9	OF-8	OF-7	OF-6	OF-5	OF-4	OF-3	OF-2	OF-1
Bulgarian Air Force
Bulgarian Air Force		Генерал; General	Генерал-лейтенант; General-leytenant	Генерал-майор; General-mayor	Бригаден генерал Brigaden general	Полковник; Polkovnik	Подполковник; Podpolkovnik	Майор; Mayor	Капитан; Kapitan	Старши лейтенант Starshi leytenant	Лейтенант; Leytenant

=== Other ranks ===
The rank insignia of non-commissioned officers and enlisted personnel.

NATO code	OR-9	OR-8	OR-7	OR-6	OR-5	OR-4	OR-3	OR-2	OR-1
Bulgarian Air Force
Bulgarian Air Force	Офицерски кандидат Ofitserski kandidat	Старшина; Starshyna	Старши сержант Starshi serzhant	Сержант; Serzhant	Младши сержант Mladshi serzhant	Ефрейтор; Efreytor	Редник; Rednik

== See also ==
- List of former Bulgarian military aircraft
- List of modern equipment of the Bulgarian Armed Forces
- 28th Air Detachment
- Bulgarian cosmonaut program
- List of joint US-Bulgarian military bases
