= Stara Zagora Air Base =

- Авиобаза Стара Загора
- Stara Zagora, Bulgaria

Site information
- Type: Former Military Air Base
- Operator: Bulgarian Air Force
- Controlled by: Bulgarian Air Force

Location
- Location within Bulgaria
- Coordinates: 42°22′36.00″N 25°39′18.70″E

Site history
- In use: 1982 – 2000

Airfield information
- Identifiers: ICAO: LBSD
- Elevation: 170 metres (560 ft) AMSL
Runways
Direction	Length and surface
n/a	Concrete

Stara Zagora Air Base is a former Bulgarian military base that later became a regional, civil airport. It is located in central Bulgaria, southeast of Kazanluk and a few km south of Stara Zagora town. Its asphalt runway covers 2499 x 45 m.

== History ==
The base is also known as Kolyu Ganchevo. It opened in January 1940.

It used to house the 13th Attack Helicopters Air Regiment (flying 44 Mil Mi-24, of which 6 were of the "V" version and the remainder of the "D") of the 10th Combined Air Corps. As The corps transformed into Tactical Air Command, so did the regiment, becoming an air base. In 1994 it became the 23rd Attack Helicopter Air Base. The base closed in 2000, with all helicopters transferred to 24 Helicopter Base at Krumovo.

== See also ==
- List of Bulgarian Air Force bases
- List of Bulgarian military bases
- 28th Air Detachment
- Military of Bulgaria
- The Bulgarian Cosmonauts
- List of joint US-Bulgarian military bases
