= State aviation operator (Bulgaria) =

IATA	ICAO	Call sign
—	BGF	BULGARIAN
- Founded: 1972
- Fleet size: 5
- Headquarters: Sofia, Bulgaria
- Key people: Todor Boyadzhiev
- Employees: c. 80
- Website: www.sao.bg

The state aviation operator (Bulgarian: Държавен авиационен оператор), until 23 February 2021 referred to as 28th Air Detachment (Bulgarian: Авиоотряд 28) is an agency, subordinated to the Bulgarian government, which provides air transport for the President, Prime Minister and other high-ranking state officials.

== History ==
=== Until 1972 ===
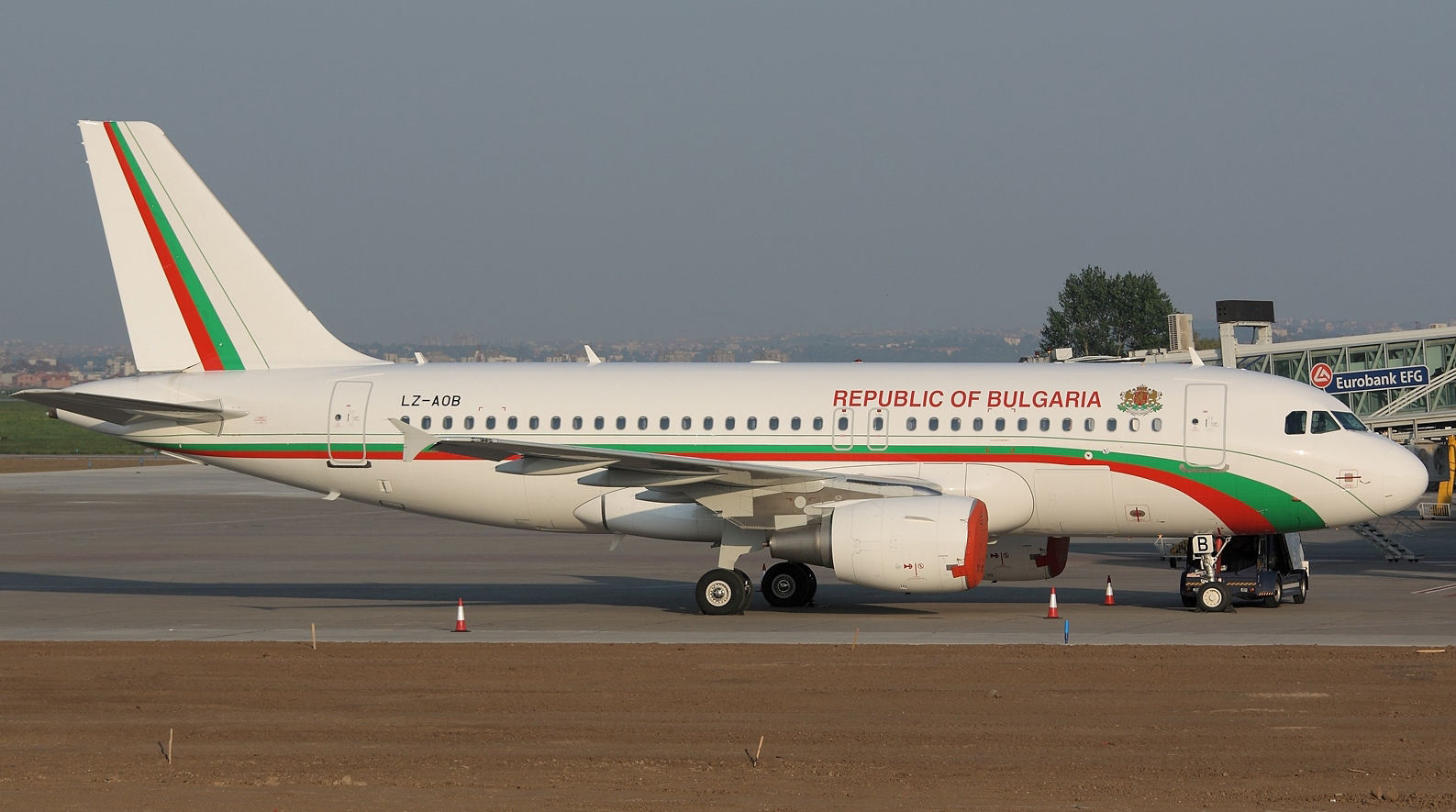
Bulgarian Air Force Airbus A319

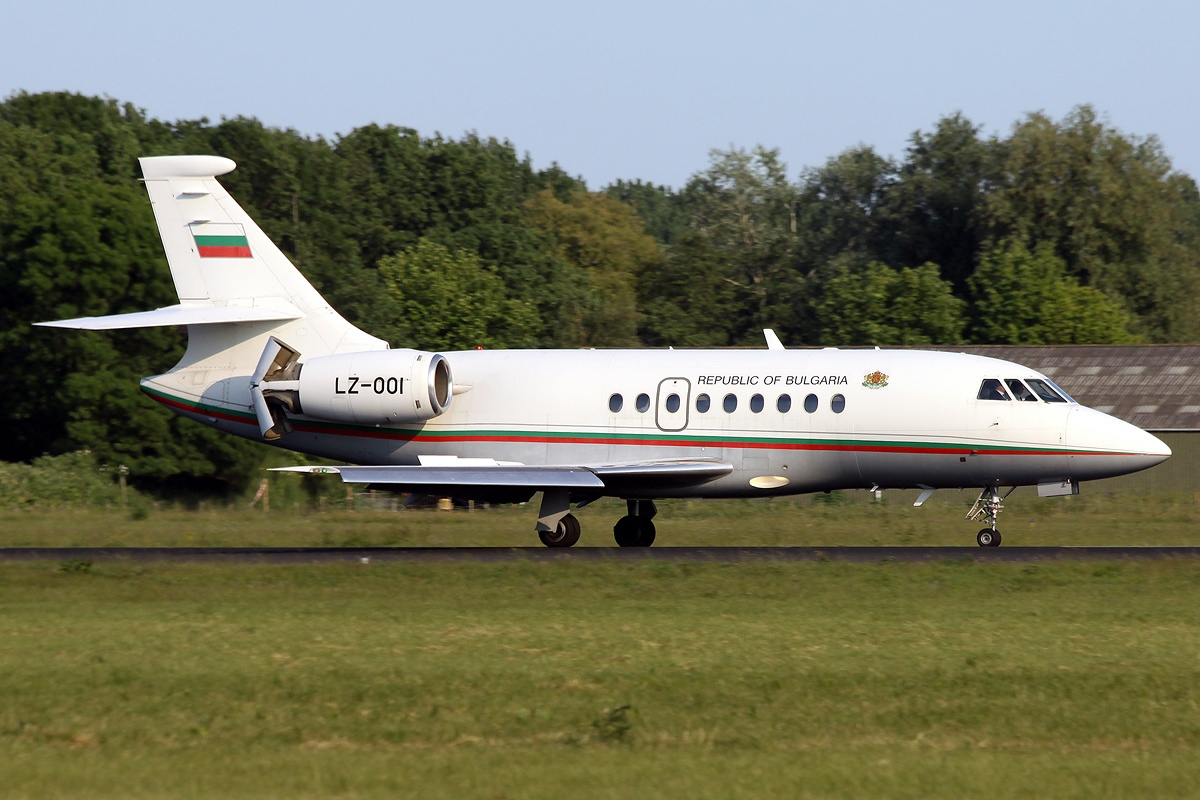
Bulgarian Air Force Falcon 2000

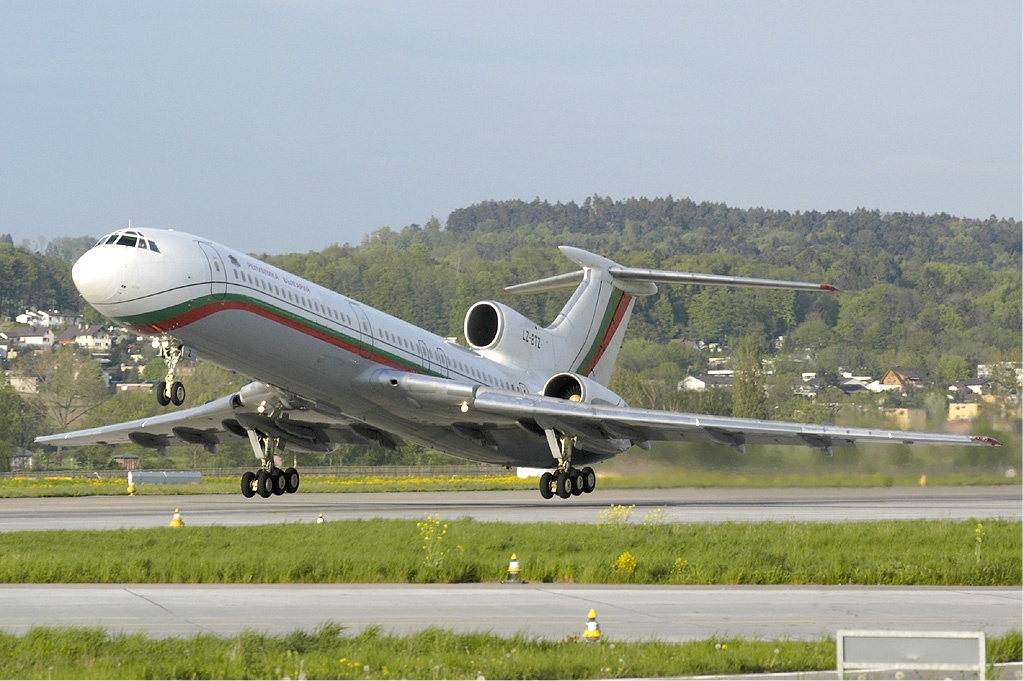
Bulgarian Air Force Tu-154M

After World War II, Bulgaria had no civil aviation or airplanes to service the state administration and implementation of specific government tasks. After the end of the war, the only aircraft in the Bulgarian military, Heinkel He 111 bombers - were converted into passenger use. The need for civil aviation became more obvious in 1946, when the Bulgarian government delegation had to participate in international meetings related to the end of World War II. A Lisunov Li-2 was delivered by the Soviet Union to Bulgaria for use as a transport aircraft. It was assigned to the 16th Transport Air Base in Sofia to be used by the government, and refurbished with a sofa and radio receiver.

In 1956 two new Ilyushin Il-14 were delivered. Meanwhile, almost all governmental flights were executed by planes and crews sent by the USSR for this purpose.

=== 28th Air Detachment ===
On 23 February 2021, Air Detachment 28 changed its name to "State Aviation Operator".

== Fleet ==
State aviation operator operates 1 Airbus A319, 1 Dassault Falcon 2000, 2 Helicopters Mi-8 and 1 AgustaWestland AW109.

Fleet of State aviation operator
Aircraft	Number	Orders	Passengers			Notes
Aircraft	Number	Orders	C	Y	Total	Notes
Airbus A319	1 (as of August 2019)	0	—	—	—	LZ-AOB
Dassault Falcon 2000	1	0	—	—	—	LZ-OOI
Mi-8	2	0	—	—	—	LZ-CAT ; LZ-CAN
AgustaWestland AW109	1	0	—	—	—	LZ-BMB

== See also ==
- List of air transports of Heads of State and Government
