= Aromanians in Bulgaria =

Ethnic Aromanian minority within Bulgaria

Aromanian: Armãnji tu Vurgãrii Bulgarian: Арумъни в България

Total population
- 2,000–3,000, possibly 6,000

Regions with significant populations
- Western Rhodopes, as well as Blagoevgrad, Pazardzhik, Plovdiv and Sofia provinces and in Sofia proper

Languages
- Aromanian (native), Bulgarian

Religion
- Predominantly Eastern Orthodoxy

Related ethnic groups
- Aromanians

The Aromanians in Bulgaria (Aromanian: armãnji or rrãmãnji; Bulgarian: Арумъни), commonly known as "Vlachs" (Bulgarian: Власи) and under several other names, are a non-recognized ethnic minority in the country. There are an estimated 2,000 to 3,000 Aromanians in Bulgaria, although estimates coming from Bulgarian Aromanians themselves raise this number to 6,000. They live in the Western Rhodopes, the Blagoevgrad, Pazardzhik, Plovdiv and Sofia provinces and in the city of Sofia, the capital of Bulgaria itself. More precisely, the Aromanians of Bulgaria are concentrated in the villages of Anton and Dorkovo and on the cities and towns of Blagoevgrad, Dupnitsa, Peshtera, Rakitovo, Samokov, Sofia and Velingrad, as well as on parts of the aforementioned provinces located in the Balkan Mountains. Some also live on the towns of Bratsigovo and Pirdop and on the cities of Plovdiv and Pazardjik, as well as on the Rila mountain range.

== History ==
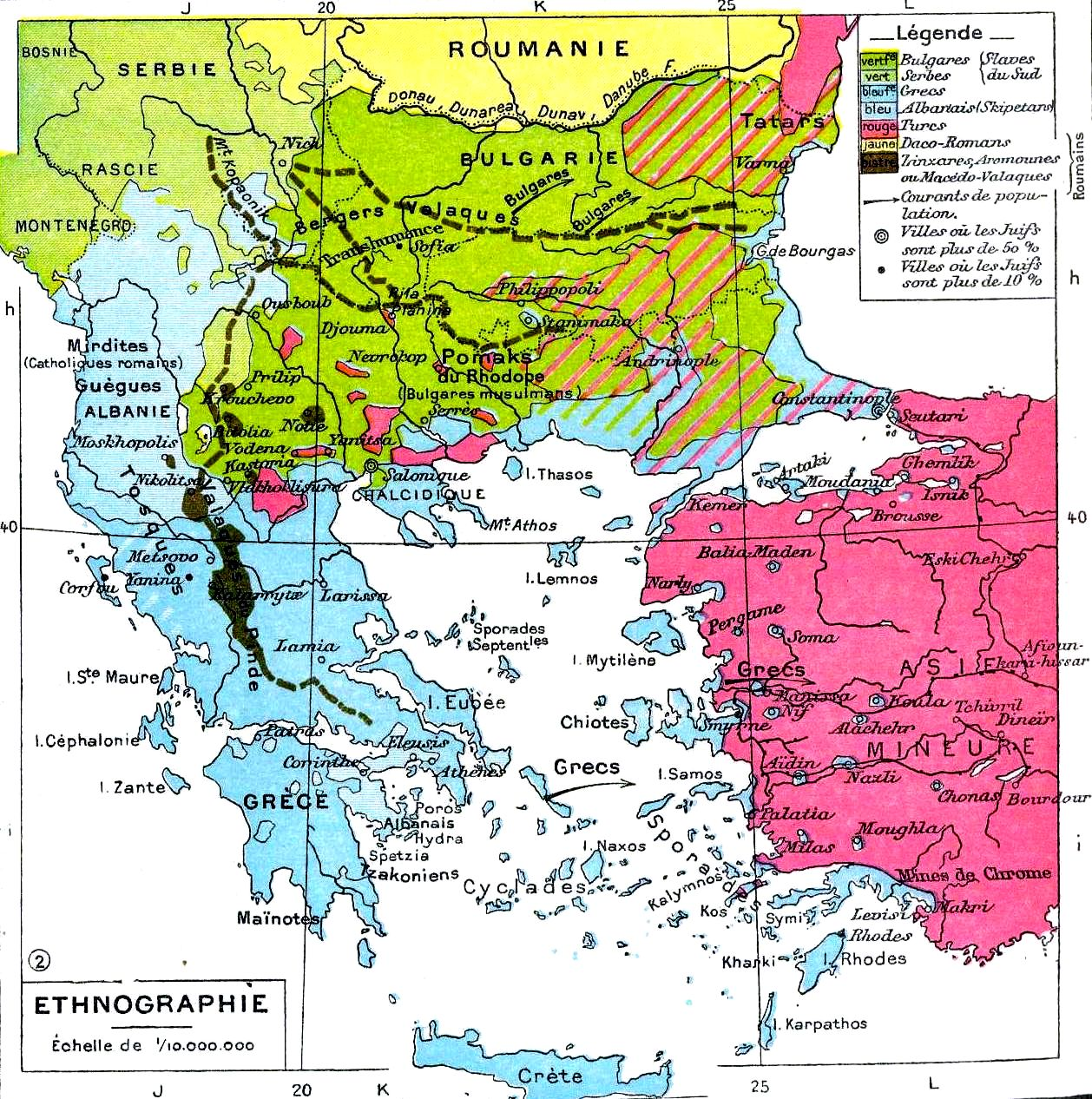
An 1898 ethnic map of the Balkans. Aromanians, featured in black, can be seen scattered all over modern Bulgaria. The closely related Romanians, shown in yellow, are also present in the north of the country.

Aromanians arrived in Bulgaria in several waves of migration. Firstly, a group of Aromanian craftmen and tradesmen migrated to what is now the country in the 17th century. The descendants of these people are largely assimilated now, with only remnants of Aromanian culture and a weak Aromanian identity that goes together with a main and more relevant Bulgarian one. Also notable are herders from the Gramos Mountains of Greece who emigrated to modern Bulgaria during the 18th century. Their descendants have a stronger Aromanian identity nowadays in comparison to that of the 17th-century Aromanians that came to Bulgaria. Furthermore, some Aromanians left Moscopole in modern Albania, formerly a cultural center for all the Aromanian nation, following its destruction during the second half of the 18th century, with some emigrating to modern Bulgaria but also to other countries such as modern Serbia and parts of modern North Macedonia. These Aromanians would become important figures for the national movements of these countries, including Bulgaria, and would end up receiving the name "Tsintsar", term which ended up being embraced by the Aromanians in Serbia.

Following the recognition of the Ullah millet in the Ottoman Empire in the early 20th century, which gave the Aromanians rights such as the one to have their own churches and schools, ethnic Bulgarian and Greek bands on the Ottoman Empire began to persecute and attack the Aromanians, with instances of killings of Aromanian priests or of attacks on entire Aromanian villages. The Greek authorities would later also join in this persecution during the Balkan Wars of 1912 and 1913, and so did the Bulgarian ones, which began to seize Aromanian churches and hand them over to Bulgarian-speaking congregations. All this violence and instability prompted some Aromanians to emigrate to Romania, which was attempting to portray itself as a "homeland" for this ethnic group at the time. More precisely, they migrated to Southern Dobruja, formerly a Bulgarian region conquered by Romania in 1913. This region had a large ethnically Bulgarian (and also Turkish) population that was hostile to Romanian rule. Therefore, Romania sent several Romanian families from other parts of the country, but also Aromanians from regions of the Balkans, to colonize the region. The number of Aromanian families that came to Southern Dobruja varies between 2,500 and 6,000. Once settled, the Aromanians often engaged in fights and violence with the native Bulgarian communities.

This situation continued until 7 September 1940, when the Treaty of Craiova was signed. Through it, Romania was forced to cede back this region to Bulgaria. A population exchange was carried out in which all the Bulgarians from Northern Dobruja, another region of Romania, were brought to Southern Dobruja, while those Romanians, Aromanians and Megleno-Romanians (another ethnic group from the Balkans that was settled in the region) from Southern Dobruja, all simply regarded as Romanians during the process, were relocated to Northern Dobruja. The Romanian authorities also proposed the exchange of minorities from outside of Dobruja to their respective countries, which would have meant that all the Aromanians of Bulgaria would have been taken to Romania. However, the Bulgarian authorities rejected this.

As a result of the population exchange between Bulgaria and Romania, today, there are around 2,000 to 3,000 or even 6,000 Aromanians in Bulgaria. They are not officially recognized as a national ethnic minority and there is a certain degree of assimilation, with most Aromanians declaring themselves as Bulgarians or "Vlachs" on Bulgarian censuses. Bulgarian Aromanians do not have schools in their own language and their number of ethnic organizations is low. The Holy Trinity Romanian Orthodox Church in Sofia is used by both Bulgarian Aromanians and Bulgarian Romanians for the organization of ethnic activities. Today, the Aromanian Association in Sofia stands out as one of the most vivid supporters of Aromanian culture and rights in Bulgaria, publishing since 1998 the newspaper Armãnlu. Other Aromanian organizations are also present in Dupnitsa, Peshtera and Velingrad, and Aromanian folklore groups exist in almost every place inhabited by Aromanians within the country. Despite this, with the low number of Aromanians existing in Bulgaria, Aromanian cultural and ethnic activities in the country suffer considerable struggle. Bulgarian Aromanians are usually polyglots nowadays, with many knowing Aromanian and Bulgarian but also Greek, Turkish and limited knowledge of Romanian. Ethnic endogamy (that is, people only marrying others of their same ethnic group) is also a traditional feature of the Aromanians of Bulgaria, although in recent times there has been significant interethnic marriage with ethnic Bulgarians.

The Aromanians of Bulgaria have a notable relationship with the Romanians of the country. Both employ the Romanian Orthodox church in Sofia for ethnic activities and there are several cultural and folkloric similarities between the two. Some Bulgarian Aromanians even call themselves "Romanian", but with distinction to actual Romanians living along the Danube in Bulgaria, who are sometimes referred to by the exonym mucan. This has also been recorded in the Aromanians of Romania, who live in Northern Dobruja. In addition, in Bulgaria, Aromanians and Romanians are collectively referred to as "Vlachs". Romanian-speaking Boyash Gypsies are also associated with this term. Another group with which the Aromanians of Bulgaria have a high degree of relationship is with the Sarakatsani (or Karakachans), a transhumant Greek subgroup.

== See also ==
- Aromanians in Albania
- Aromanians in Greece
- Aromanians in North Macedonia
- Aromanians in Romania
- Aromanians in Serbia
