= Bulgaria–Romania relations =

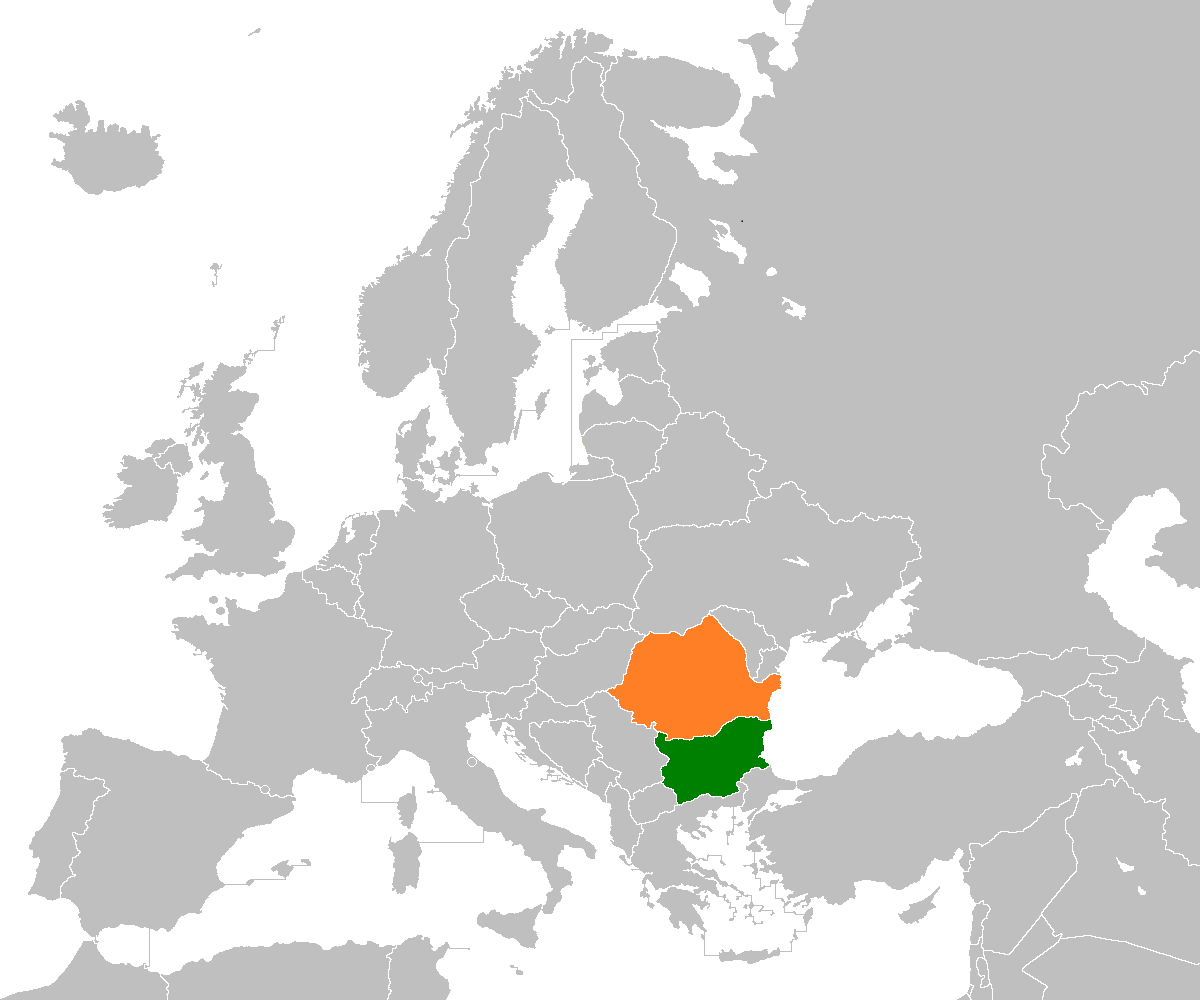

- Bulgaria: Romania

Diplomatic mission
- Embassy of Bulgaria, Bucharest: Embassy of Romania, Sofia

Bulgaria–Romania relations are foreign relations between Bulgaria and Romania. There are 7,336 Bulgarians who are living in Romania and around 4,575 Romanians living in Bulgaria. The countries share 608 km of common borders, mostly along the Danube. Both countries are full members of the European Union and NATO. Both countries joined NATO on 29 March 2004, and then the European Union on 1 January 2007.

== History ==
During the first half of the 20th century, Romania and Bulgaria had a serious conflict over the Dobruja region. This dispute, while now largely forgotten, escalated into all out war in 1913. Romania participated in the Second Balkan War against Bulgaria. According to the Treaty of Bucharest concluded after the Bulgarian defeat, Bulgaria had to hand over Southern Dobruja region to Romania. The territorial dispute between the two countries ended with the Treaty of Craiova in 1940. After the treaty, the two countries carried out a population exchange in the affected areas.

The two countries fought each other in the First World War after Romania's entry in 1916. The Bulgarians took part in the campaign against Romania, the capture of Bucharest and the signing of the Treaty of Bucharest.

PR Bulgaria–Romanian PR relations
- Bulgaria: Romania

PR Bulgaria–SR Romania relations
- Bulgaria: Romania

During the 20th century, Bulgaria and Romania both fought on the side of Nazi Germany during the Second World War. In the cold war, both countries became communist states under the influence of the Soviet Union, but Romania formally left the sphere in 1964. The communist regimes of both countries ultimately collapsed in 1989.

Bulgarian relations with Romania feature regular official visits by their respective presidents. Romanian-Bulgarian relations are developing "very intensively" because of EU accession, since Romania and Bulgaria both joined the European Union in 2007.

There are close relations between Ruse and Giurgiu which have one of the two bridges on the Danube in the section shared by the two countries, the Danube Bridge. The other bridge is the New Europe Bridge located between Vidin and Calafat, its construction was completed in June, 2013.

== 2019 African swine fever controversy ==
A diplomatic row broke out in August 2019 between Bulgaria and Romania over the African swine fever (ASF).

The Bulgarian Prime Minister, Boyko Borisov, accused Romanian tourists of bringing the ASF disease and helping to spread it. Borisov is reported to have said: "There are 57,000 cars crossing from Romania each day into Bulgaria. I’m sure the Romanian tourists brought the disease. They eat on the side of the road, throw the food remains that help spread the swine disease. They are walking around, eating and throwing the remains all over the place. There’s nothing we can do."

The Romanian foreign ministry replied that it was disappointed by Borisov's words and that Romanian tourists boost Bulgaria's GDP: "Beyond the technical arguments that will be offered by the National Veterinary Health and Food Safety Authority to respond to the unfortunate statements of the prime minister of Bulgaria, Boyko Borisov, we are surprised and disappointed by the way the Bulgarian prime minister has referred to Romanian tourists, who make a substantial contribution to the GDP of Bulgaria".

== The European Union and NATO ==
Both countries became members of the European Union in 2007. Both countries became members of NATO in 2004.

== Resident diplomatic missions ==
- Bulgaria has an embassy in Bucharest.
- Romania has an embassy in Sofia.
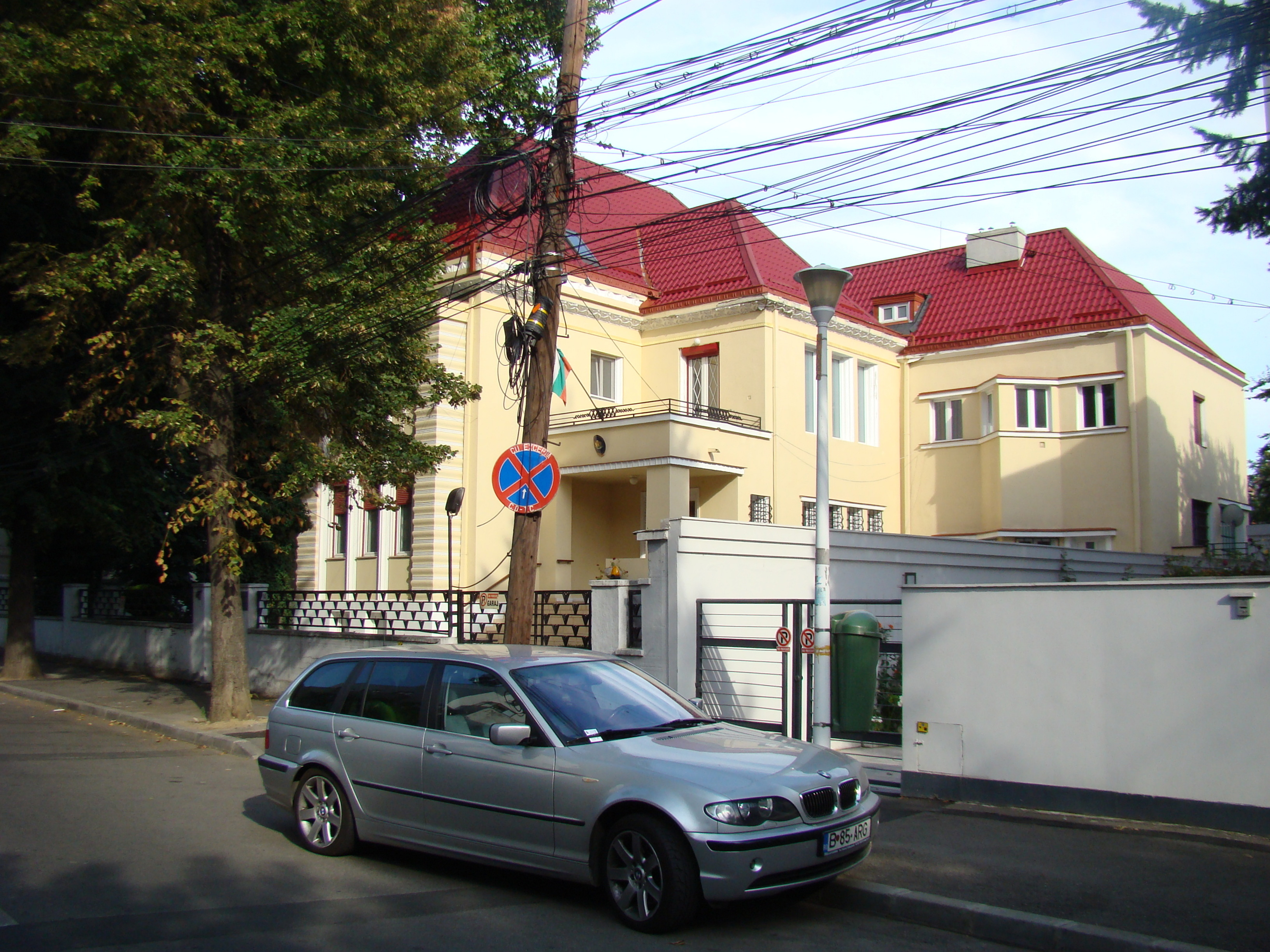
Embassy of Bulgaria in Bucharest

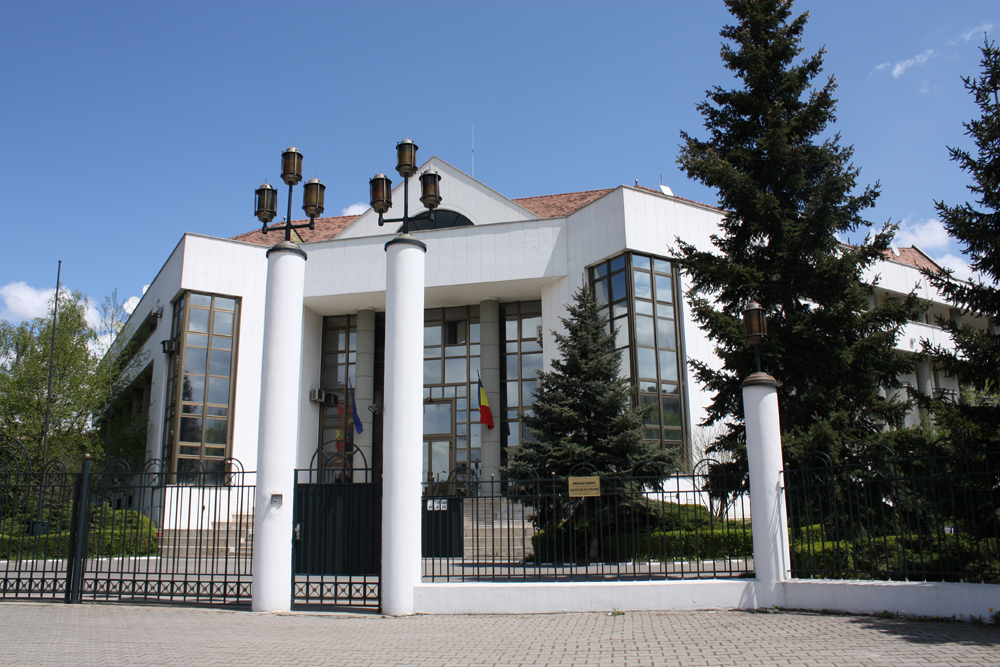
Embassy of Romania in Sofia

== Gallery ==
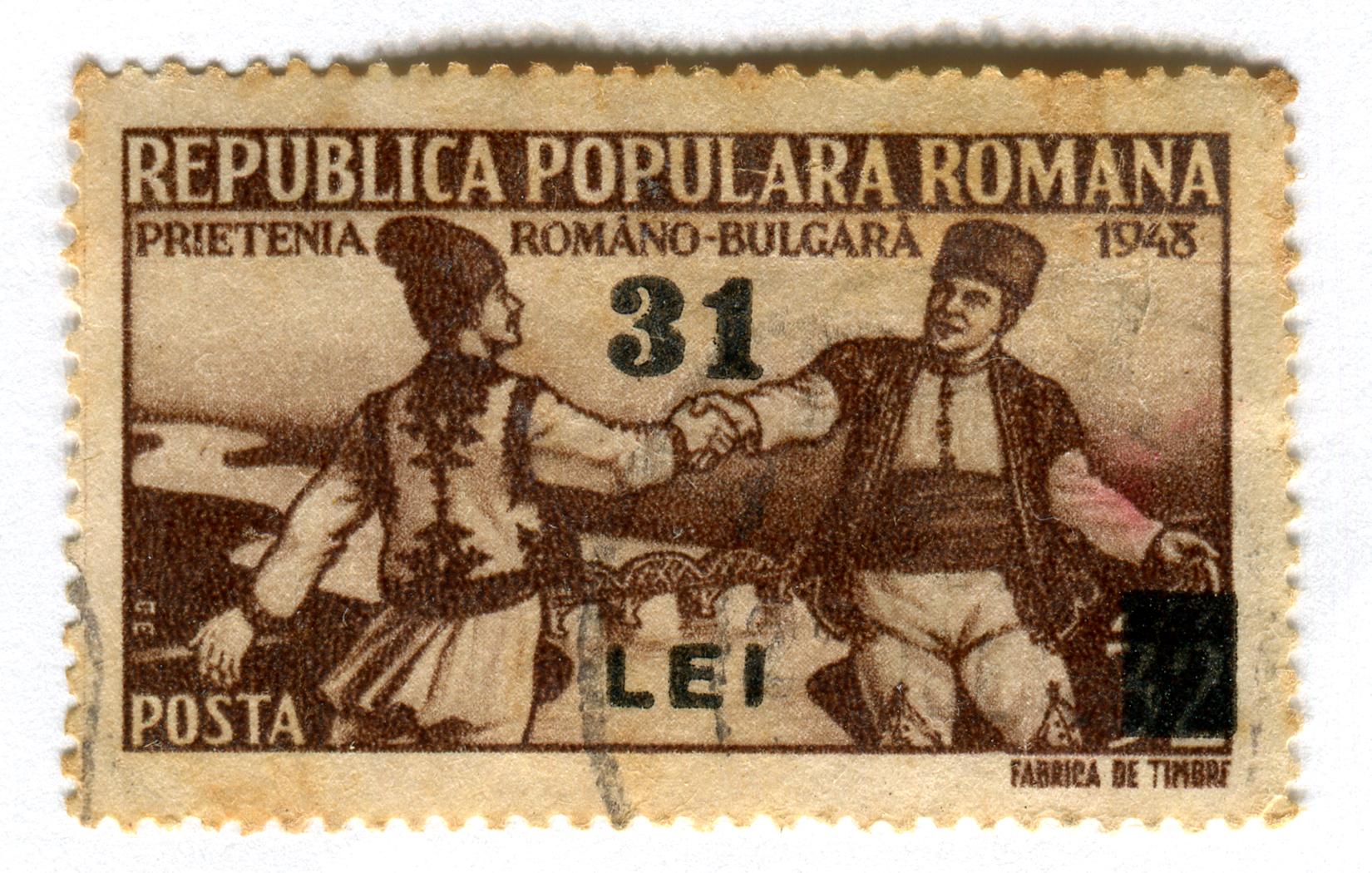
Romanian 1948 stamp depicting Romanian-Bulgarian friendship

== See also ==
- Foreign relations of Bulgaria
- Foreign relations of Romania
- Bulgaria–Romania border
- Bulgarians in Romania
- Romanians in Bulgaria
- Craiova Group
- 2007 enlargement of the European Union
- Union of Bulgaria and Romania
- Population exchange between Bulgaria and Romania
- Ivan Abadzhiev (born 1930)
