= Romanians in Bulgaria =

Ethnic Romanian minority in Bulgaria

Total population
- 891 (2011 census; restricted exclusively to those who declared Romanian ethnicity); 1,643 (2021 census; including all groups designated as "Vlach-speakers", i.e. Romanians, Aromanians and Vlax and Boyash Gypsies)

Regions with significant populations
- Northern Bulgaria, primarily along the Danube

Languages
- Romanian (native), Bulgarian

Religion
- Eastern Orthodoxy (Bulgarian Orthodox Church and Romanian Orthodox Church)

Related ethnic groups
- Aromanians in Bulgaria

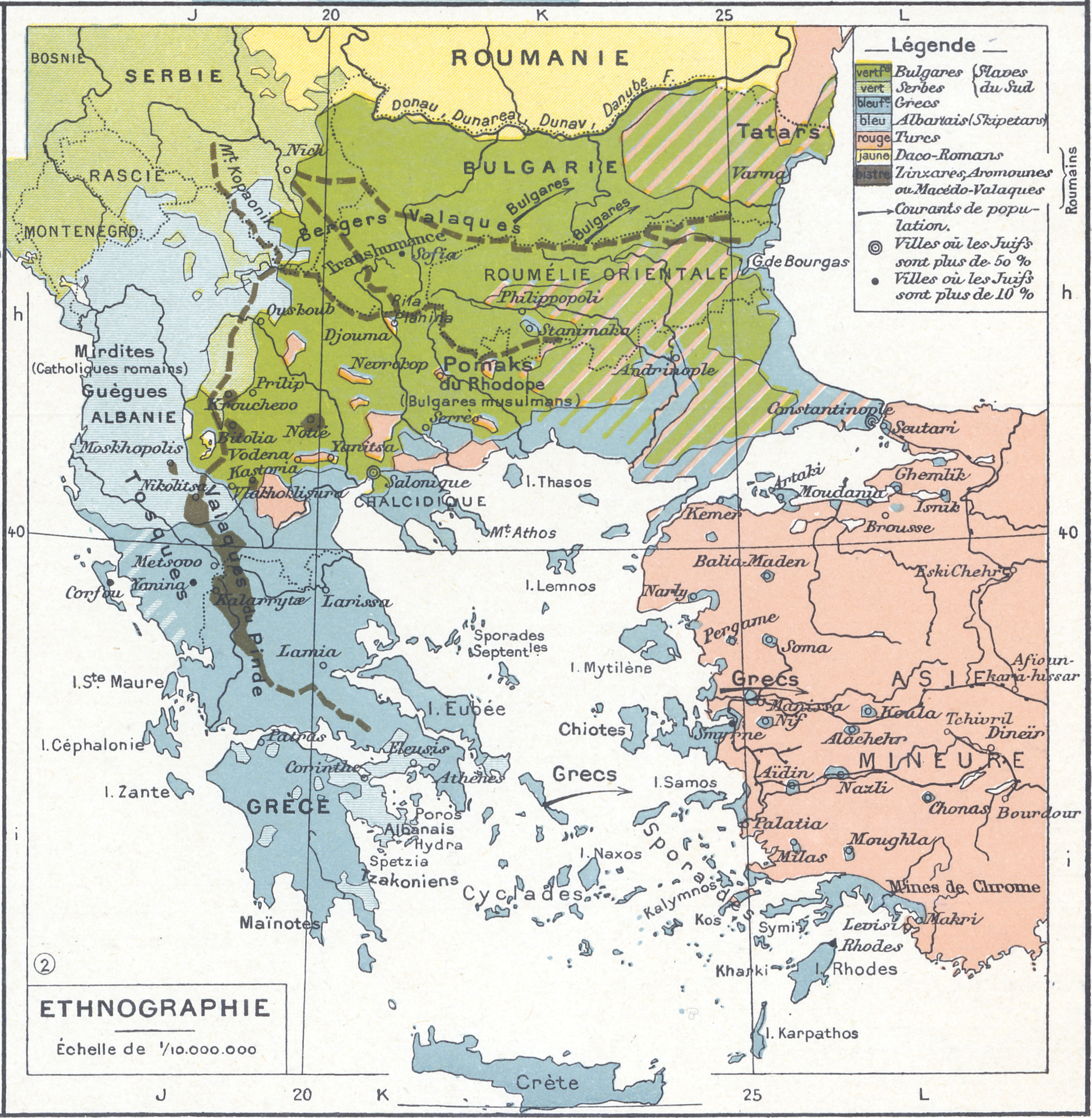
Ethnic map of the Balkans prior to the First Balkan War by Paul Vidal de la Blache

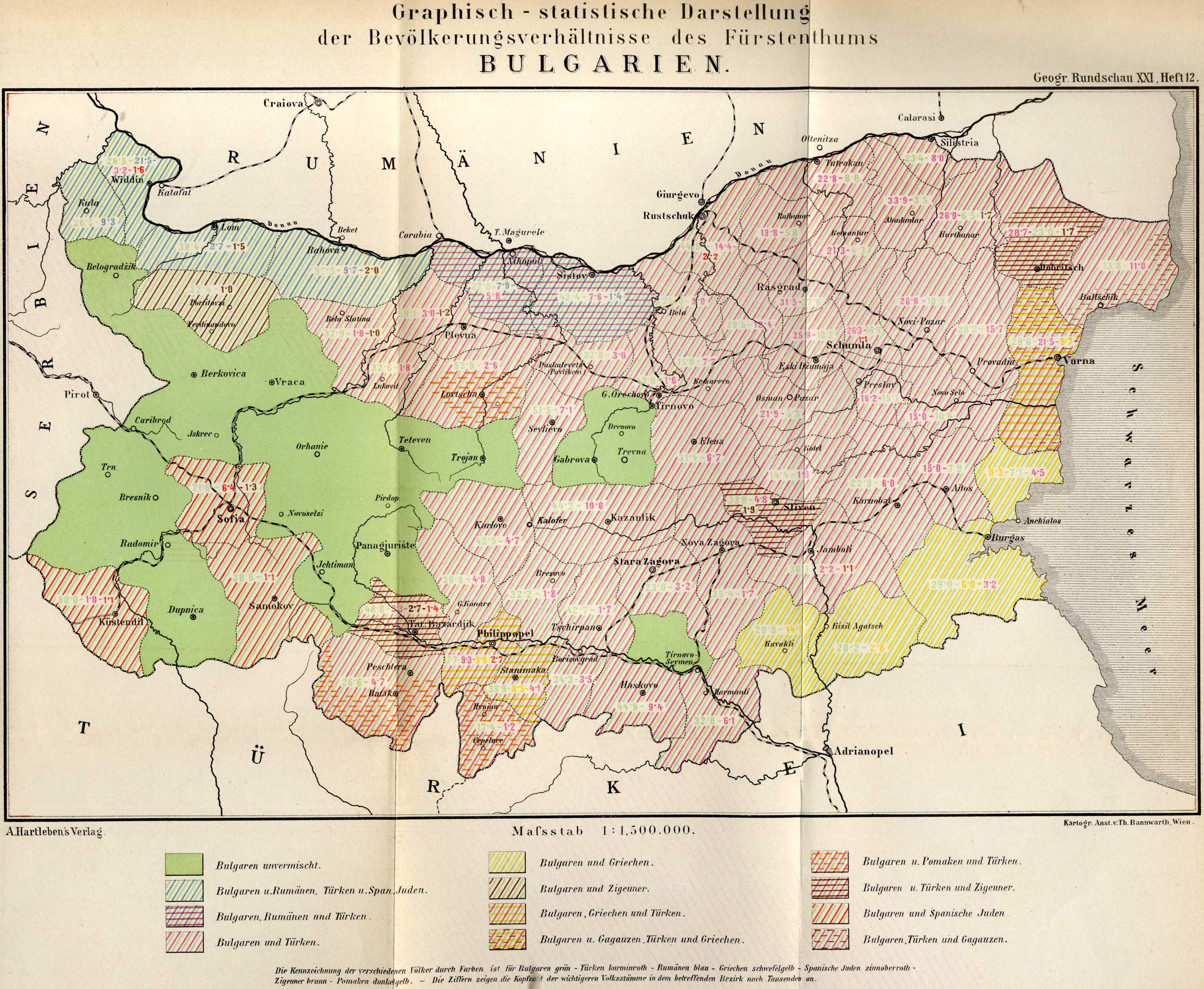
Ethnic map of Bulgaria according to census results from 1892 (blue denotes regions with a Romanian minority)

The Romanians in Bulgaria (Romanian: români or rumâni; Bulgarian: румънци, rumŭntsi, or власи, vlasi), are a small ethnic minority in Bulgaria. In the country, Romanians live in several northern regions, mostly along the Danube. This includes a region between the city of Vidin and the Timok river; these Romanians form a continuous community with the Romanian community in the Timok Valley of Serbia. Another region with a high density of Romanians is located between the towns of Oryahovo and Svishtov. Another goes from Tutrakan to the Bulgaria–Romania border at Northern Dobruja. There also are scattered groups of Romanians within the interior of Bulgaria, such as in Pleven or around Vratsa. The Romanians in Bulgaria are not recognized as a national minority, and they lack minority rights such as schools or churches in their own Romanian language. Many are subject to assimilation.

In Bulgaria, the local Romanians are commonly referred to as "Vlachs". This term is also applied to the Aromanians of the country, as well as to Romanian-speaking Boyash Gypsies. The German linguist Gustav Weigand dealt in the most detailed and concrete way with the Vlach population south of the Danube. In 1905 he undertook a special trip through Bulgaria to establish where the Vlach settlements are located and to characterize their language. According to Weigand, the largest group of Vlach population moved to the Bulgarian lands in the 1830s, when the so-called Organic statute (1831), was introduced in Walachia, by virtue of which men were subject to mandatory military service. Using the data from the population census in the Principality of Bulgaria in 1900, he pointed out that, at the end of the 19th century, 86,000 Vlachs were registered in Bulgaria, of which 11,708 (about 15%) were born north of the river, which means that they moved south of the Danube in the second half of the 19th century.

The Romanians of Bulgaria have several organizations of their own, one of them being the AVE Union of Romanian Ethnicities of Bulgaria (AVE Uniunea Etnicilor Români din Bulgaria), presided by Ivo Gheorghiev, which often organizes cultural events. One example are celebrations for the Romanian Language Day organized in Vidin by this organization. According to the Treaty of Craiova of 1940, Bulgaria and Romania exchanged a large part of the minorities living on their territory.

The following are historical census results showing the presence of Romanians in Bulgaria:

Year	"Vlachs"	Romanians
1881	49,063^{a}	
1905		73,773
1910		79,429
1926		69,080
1937		16,405
2001	10,566 ^{b}	1,088
2011	3,684	891
2021	1643	

^a This number shows those who identified their native language as "Vlach"; the 1881 census did not have a question about ethnicity.
^b The 2001 census recorded 10,566 "Vlachs", most of whom are Romanian-speakers, but the figure includes some Aromanian-speakers as well.

Out of 3,598 self-identified Vlachs, 165 declared their mother tongue as Bulgarian, 1,462 as Vlach, 1,964 as Romanian and 4 as "other" in 2011. Out of 866 self-identified Romanians, 37 declared their mother tongue as Bulgarian, 3 as Vlach, and 822 as Romanian in 2011.

== See also ==
- Bulgaria–Romania relations
- Bulgarisation
- Bulgarians in Romania
- Population exchange between Bulgaria and Romania
