= Union of Bulgaria and Romania =

Unsuccessful proposed union between Bulgaria and Romania

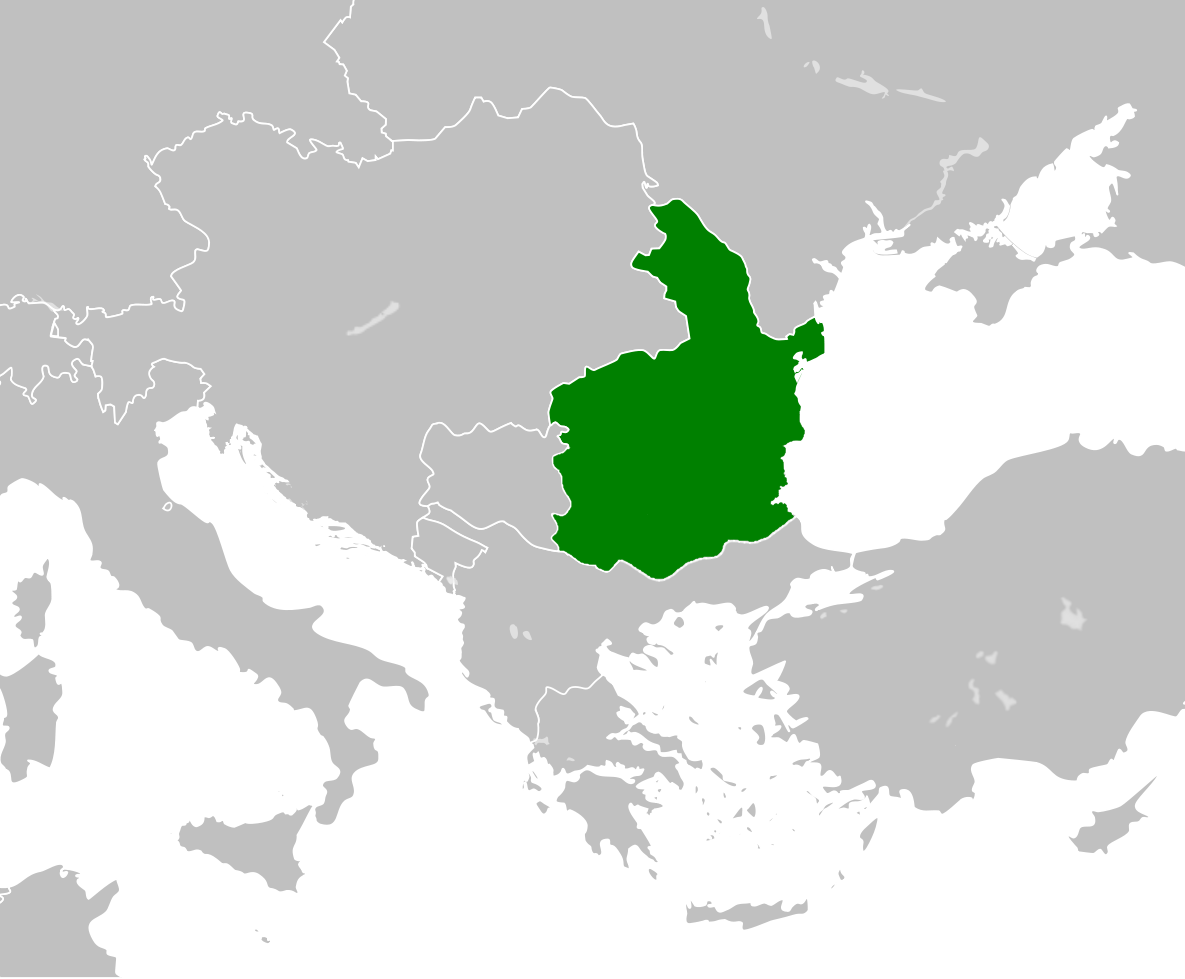
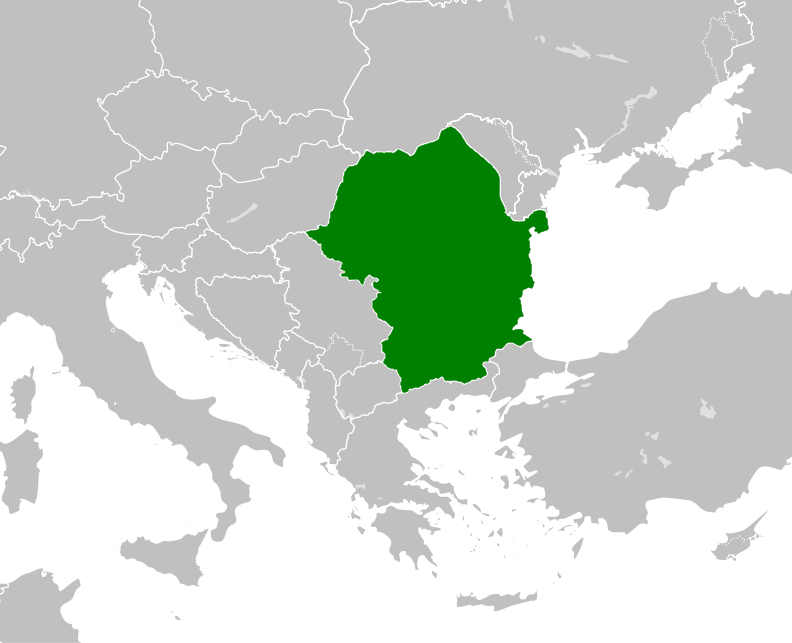
Map of a Bulgarian–Romanian union had it succeeded in 1887 (top) and in the present day (bottom)

Several failed proposals were made during the 19th and 20th centuries to unify Bulgaria and Romania into a common state, under either a federation, a personal union or a confederation. Such ideas found support, especially in Bulgaria, and there were several opportunities to realize them. Proposals usually came from Bulgarians, but it was Romanians who were to hold the leading positions. These proposals ultimately failed because of cultural and political differences between the two peoples and opposition from great powers like Austria-Hungary and especially Russia.

This idea had historical precedents: Bulgarians and Romanians had first lived together under the rule of the First Bulgarian Empire, which extended its power into areas that form part of Romania today; under the Second Bulgarian Empire, established through the cooperation of Bulgarians and Vlachs (Romanians); and under the Ottoman Empire, which defeated the Second Bulgarian Empire and conquered and ruled territories populated by Bulgarians and Romanians for centuries. During the late 18th century, a popular concept emerged in the Balkans: the federalization of the region, aimed at fighting nearby empires and solving conflicts between its peoples. The idea eventually spread in Bulgaria and Romania's predecessors (Moldavia and Wallachia), gaining some support by figures such as Georgi Sava Rakovski. After the establishment of an autonomous Bulgarian principality and the full independence of Romania in 1878, relations between the countries were enhanced and there were several Romanian nominees for the Bulgarian throne. These were King Carol I of Romania and the nobleman Georges Bibescu, son of a former Wallachian prince. They were not taken into account in the final selection, and the eventual choice in 1879 was Alexander of Battenberg, a German prince.

Although Alexander had good relations with Romania, he was forced to abdicate in 1886 following a period of political turmoil in Bulgaria caused by Russia, which tried to exert its influence over the country. Due to this, Stefan Stambolov, who was politically anti-Russian, became leader of the regents. Stambolov tried again to establish a personal union with Romania, and negotiations were conducted. Carol I would be the head of such a state with either two separate governments or a single, united one. Though Carol I had an interest in becoming ruler of Bulgaria, Russia strongly opposed this. Russia threatened to break off diplomatic relations with Romania and to invade both Romania and Bulgaria, forcing Carol I to abandon the possibility. Afterwards, Ferdinand of Saxe-Coburg and Gotha was elected Prince of Bulgaria in June 1887. New approaches to effect a union were attempted decades later in the communist era, especially by Georgi Dimitrov, but the Soviet Union strongly rejected them. Joseph Stalin, its leader, deemed the proposal unthinkable.

A Bulgarian–Romanian union was never established. The disapproval of several great powers, the differences in the Bulgarians' and the Romanians' national goals and the lack of actual interest or even opposition between these peoples, added to the hostile environment of the region in which they lived, prevented it. The idea of the federalization of the Balkans, which had great support in its time, diminished across the region after the conflicts at the beginning of the 20th century that occurred throughout Europe and, later, the violent breakup of Yugoslavia. Despite all this, the European Union, of which Bulgaria and Romania have been members since 2007, puts democratic values and pluralistic visions for European integration on the horizon of the Balkans, which has led to an idea within the academic world that a new federation proposal could emerge in the region as a result of all of this.

== Background ==
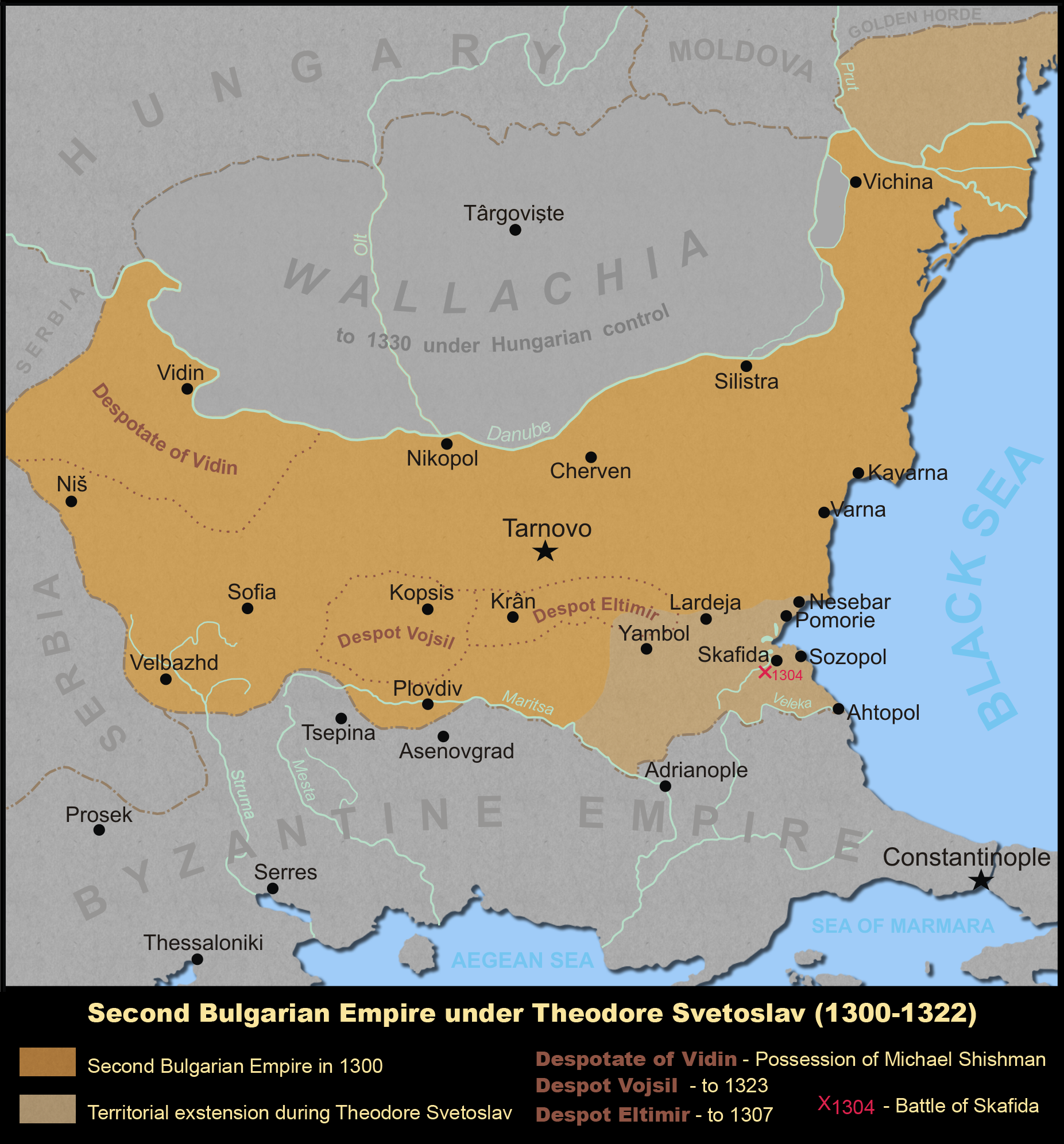
Map of the Second Bulgarian Empire at the beginning of the 14th century. This state was sometimes referred to as a historic similitude between Bulgaria and Romania.

The Bulgarians and Romanians lived under a common state on several occasions. In 680 AD, the Bulgars, a Turkic people from the Pontic–Caspian steppes, crossed the Danube and posteriorly established a state in the area, with its capital at Pliska. They assimilated with the Slavic culture brought there a century earlier, which eventually gave rise to the modern Bulgarian people. The First Bulgarian Empire expanded its territory north of the Danube to the Tisza River and, during the 9th century, covered large parts of Romania's present-day territories. There, the Bulgarians strongly enforced Slavic and Christian influences and cultural elements over the Romanians' ancestors. This state was nevertheless defeated by the Byzantine Empire and incorporated into its dominions in 1018.

In the 12th century, an attempt to restore the empire, the Uprising of Asen and Peter, ended in the establishment of the Second Bulgarian Empire. Numerous Vlachs (Romanians) participated in this rebellion, especially in its initial phase. They played a decisive role during the creation of the new empire, with its first leaders, the brothers Ivan Asen I, Kaloyan and Peter II, described as Vlachs by contemporaneous sources. Kaloyan was given the title imperator Caloihannes dominus omnium Bulgarorum atque Blachorum ("Emperor Kaloyan, Lord of All Bulgarians and Vlachs") by Patriarch Basil I of Bulgaria and the title Rex Bulgarorum et Blachorum ("King of the Bulgarians and the Vlachs") by Pope Innocent II. Additionally, Moesia, the region where the rebellion began, had a high Vlach population at the time of the revolt. Over time, just like the Turkic Bulgars in the first empire, the Vlachs lost their relevance in governance.

Supporters of a Bulgarian–Romanian union looked back to the Second Bulgarian Empire as a common ground between the two, and historians now debate whether its historical heritage is Bulgarian or Romanian. The Turkish Ottoman Empire defeated this state in the late 14th century, and later extended its power over the Romanian principalities of Wallachia (in the 15th century) and Moldavia (in the 16th century). Unlike Bulgaria, these principalities were never directly incorporated as provinces but remained as vassal states.

In the late 18th century, the idea of unifying the Balkans under one federation appeared and gained strength. It was promoted as politically necessary, especially after wars and revolutions. One of the earliest proposals came during the 1790s from Rigas Feraios, a Greek with Aromanian origins, who conceived of the establishment of a Greek-ruled united Balkan state that would succeed the Ottoman Empire. The Balkan peoples saw unification as an opportunity to oppose the imperialist policies of the great powers, particularly those of the Habsburg and Ottoman empires, to ensure a more independent and stable development and to resolve the conflicts between the nations of the region. Proposals included uniting the Balkans alone (Balkan Federation) or with other neighboring nations (Danubian Federation), as well as the union of the Balkan Christians or only of the zone's South Slavs. The main advocates were intellectuals, revolutionaries and politicians from both the right and left wings. Some examples are the Romanian diplomat and politician Dimitrie Brătianu, the Romanian lawyer and politician Aurel Popovici and the Bulgarian writer Lyuben Karavelov. A federation, a confederation, a federal monarchic union or a federal republic were contemplated to accomplish this. A personal union was another option as this was a period when monarchies were numerous.

The Bulgarians and the Romanians were already familiar with the concept of national unification. Bulgaria, which was established as an Ottoman vassal state after a war in 1878, united with the Ottoman autonomous province of Eastern Rumelia in 1885, remaining in a personal union with it until 1908, when Bulgaria proclaimed its full independence from the Ottoman Empire. Romanians consider the brief union of the principalities of Wallachia, Moldavia and Transylvania of 1600 under Michael the Brave the first Romanian national union. Romania itself was the product of a personal union, that of Wallachia and Moldavia between 1859 and 1862 under Prince Alexandru Ioan Cuza. This state was initially known as the "United Principalities of Moldavia and Wallachia", but it was renamed in 1866 to simply "Romania".

== History ==
=== Initial proposals ===
During the 19th century, the idea of federalization was on the minds of both Romanians and Bulgarians. Romanians wanted to accomplish the independence, liberation and unification of the Romanian nation from the Habsburg (or Austrian or Austro-Hungarian), Russian and Ottoman empires, and some thought of using this idea to achieve these aims. Notable supporters of this were Nicolae Bălcescu, Dimitrie Brătianu, Mihai Eminescu and Aurel Popovici, who either suggested the integration of Romania into a larger Balkan state or the federalization of the Austrian or Austro-Hungarian empires in order to pass down power to the Transylvanian Romanians. Members of the Bulgarian liberation movement had similar goals to the Romanians. They looked at allying or uniting with nearly all of their neighbors, be they Romanians, Serbs, Greeks and even Turks, to accomplish them.

A Bulgarian revolutionary, Georgi Sava Rakovski, advocated for unity among the Balkans to liberate themselves from the Ottoman Empire. The uncooperative nationalist attitude of the Greek and Serbian ruling elites disappointed him, and thus, he went to Bucharest in late 1863. After seeing the resistance to control by the Greek Ecumenical Patriarchate of Constantinople (for which measures such as the proclamation of independence of the Romanian Orthodox Church and the establishment of its Holy Synod were taken) and for independence from the Ottomans that was taking place in the Romanian United Principalities, he began to see the country as a favorable option for the liberation of the Bulgarians. In 1864, in the bilingual newspaper Badushtnost (Viitorulŭ in Romanian from that epoch), Rakovski talked about the relations between Bulgarians and Romanians, emphasizing they had always been full of "brotherly love and union" and that cooperation between the two was necessary. He called for a Bulgarian–Romanian rapprochement "based on equality" and described the Second Bulgarian Empire as a "strong state" in which Bulgarians and Romanians lived together. It is likely Rakovski said this envisioning a reestablishment of the empire. The newspaper set itself the goal of defending the rights of Romanians and Bulgarians against the Ottoman Empire and the Ecumenical Patriarch of Constantinople.

It is unclear what Rakovski's exact plans were, but historians have said he supported a "Bulgarian–Vlach dualism" model for unifying the Bulgarians and the Romanians. Dualism refers to a real union between two states, the most famous dual state being Austria-Hungary. Rakovski developed good relations with the Romanian prince, Alexandru Ioan Cuza, but the latter was deposed by a coalition of conservatives and radical liberals known as the "monstrous coalition" in February 1866. As this coup had violated the Ottoman conditions for recognizing Romania's formation, the members of this coalition were concerned about a possible Ottoman military retaliation in favor of the prince, so they searched for allies. One option was Rakovski, but they learned later he was close to the prince, so they allied themselves with a former associate of Rakovski, Ivan Kasabov. Kasabov proposed that Romania support a Bulgarian rebellion in the Ottoman Empire (since a Bulgarian entity did not yet exist) to divert attention from the coup in Bucharest. One document entitled the Act for Sacred Coalition between Romanians and Bulgarians was drafted for settling this. According to it, a certain Bulgarian revolutionary organization in Bucharest was supposed to organize this rebellion, to lead two other Bulgarian revolutionary organizations in Serbia and the Ottoman Empire and to support them until they had funds of their own. After the Ottoman Empire's defeat, independent states that would unite as one confederation were to be established in the lands of and adjacent to modern-day Bulgaria. However, this document was never signed, the project remained unrealized and the Romanian liberals withdrew from the alliance after Carol I, from the German House of Hohenzollern, became prince of Romania in May 1866.

Another suggestion for a union involving Bulgarians and Romanians was that of the Bulgarian writer Lyuben Karavelov. He intended a union of the South Slavs and Romania, Albania and Greece. He presented this in the newspaper Nezavisimost as an "Eastern Federation" composed of three cores: Serbia (including Bosnia and Montenegro), Bulgaria (with the regions of Moesia, Thrace and Macedonia) and Romania, with an Albanian entity and with Constantinople as a free city. Greece could be included as well if it relinquished its efforts to recover former Byzantine lands. Karavelov made partition plans for the Ottoman and Austro-Hungarian territories. It would be a federation modelled after the United States and Switzerland. Another Bulgarian with a proposal was the revolutionary Vasil Levski. He wanted a "Balkan Democratic Republic" composed of Bulgarians, Montenegrins, Romanians and Serbs, all of whom were to be equal to each other. The Bulgarian journalist and poet Hristo Botev supported a South Slavic or Balkan union, being against the proposals of a dual state with the Turks that existed at the time. Regarding Romania, Botev said that its governments "did not particularly love the Slavs" and that Romania was "a product of the Western policy, led by France, which wanted to put a barrier to Eastern Pan-Slavism".

Bulgarian unification projects aimed to solve the Bulgarian church and state questions. They were encouraged by the Russian Empire, the Western powers and other movements (such as anti-Russian Polish nationalist emigrants like Michał Czajkowski). Because of shared opposition to the Ottoman Empire, the Bulgarians and Romanians considered the option of unification several times between the 1860s and 1870s. Still, their overall interests and goals were different. For example, the Bulgarians aimed to obtain a state while the Romanians already had their own, the Bulgarians belonged to the Slavic group while the Romanians identified as Romance and the Bulgarians intended to establish themselves in the Balkans while the Romanians had interests in Central Europe. Furthermore, the Balkan countries' conflicting territorial ambitions hampered cooperation between them, which affected the Bulgarians and their national movement, considered as having developed too late in comparison to others. For example, in the series of Serbian agreements and treaties signed between 1866 and 1868 for an alliance against the Ottomans (known as the First Balkan Alliance), it was suggested that Romania would receive eastern Bulgaria up to a line between Ruse and Varna while Serbia would receive the rest. This proposal was rejected by the Romanian Government, an action that Bulgaria later appreciated.

=== Search for a Bulgarian prince ===
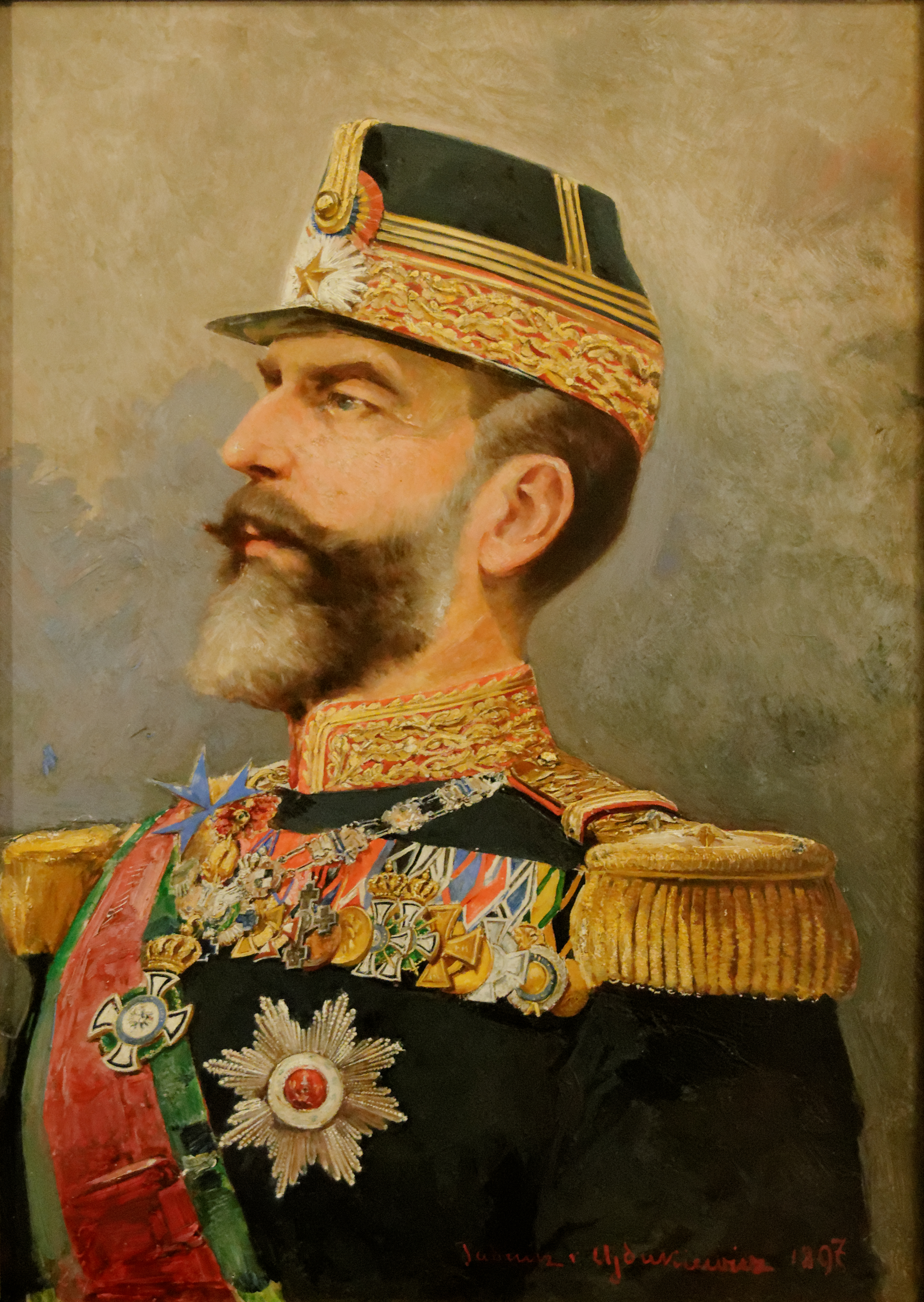
Prince Carol I of Romania, proposed candidate to the Bulgarian throne during 1878 and 1879

As a consequence of the Russo-Turkish War of 1877 and 1878, Bulgaria was established as an autonomous principality under Ottoman control. Its emergence saw the federalist proposals with Romania replaced by the possibility of a personal union as Bulgaria looked for a prince. Some viewed Prince Carol I of Romania as the most suitable person for this. Carol I had gained prestige as commander-in-chief of the Romanian Army in the war (in which Romania had also participated alongside Russia), ending in the country's full independence as determined by the Treaty of Berlin.

According to Romanian sources, at the end of the war, Nikolay Pavlovich Ignatyev, the Russian ambassador to the Ottoman Empire, "had whispered to Prince Carol I to assume the liberated Bulgarian land under his control", but this never happened supposedly because of the Romanian–Russian dispute over Southern Bessarabia. This contradicts notes published by Ignatyev himself, which say that Carol I wanted to be elected in Bulgaria and that Prime Minister Ion C. Brătianu supported him in this. Ignatyev said the Romanians' intention was "to establish a personal union between Bulgaria and Romania in order to use the former to their own advantage".

Before the election of the first Bulgarian prince began, Carol I was among the proposed nominees. The primary intention of his supporters was to establish a dual Bulgarian–Romanian state. According to the Bulgarian historian Simeon Radev, the United Kingdom supported this idea to counter Russian influence in the region. The Bulgarian politician Marko Balabanov said that in April 1879, the Englishman William Palgrave was trying to convince him and other Bulgarians of the advantages and importance of a union with Romania. Balabanov responded saying no decision would be made without Russian consent. Austria-Hungary and Russia opposed the idea, probably because of concerns that a new state would become a competitor in the region. Furthermore, the Bulgarian press said the Romanians would hardly defend Bulgarian interests and their national unification.

Carol I was not the only Romanian proposed for the Bulgarian throne. The son of the Wallachian prince Gheorghe Bibescu (who ruled between 1843 and 1848), Georges Bibescu, who was a naturalized Frenchman, was discussed as a potential candidate as well. Backed by the French politician Léon Gambetta and some Austrian ones, he sent envoys to Bulgaria to propose himself for the throne. Supporters of Bibescu also emerged from the Bulgarian side, including Svetoslav Milarov, who published the newspaper Balgarskiy lev in Veliko Tarnovo (Bulgaria); and Hristo Bachvarov and Dimitar Krastev Popov, authors of the newspaper Balgarin published in Giurgiu (Romania). Both newspapers expressed support for Bibescu to be the new prince of Bulgaria. In fact, the editors of Balgarin published a pamphlet in Vienna (Austria-Hungary) extolling the candidate's high qualities and saying that Bibescu would do the same as his father did in Wallachia: remove the "legacy of the bad Turkish administration and the Phanariot Caimacams". Pro-Bibescu propaganda said he was a descendant of boyars (nobles) from Veliko Tarnovo, the capital of the Second Bulgarian Empire.

Bibescu had several opponents, such as the newspaper Maritsa and various Bulgarian politicians. One of them was Petko Karavelov, who said that "Prince Bibescu was not a Bulgarian prince" and that "he would hardly be honored even to be a head of stable of the future Bulgarian prince". In the end, neither Carol I nor Bibescu, both of whose proposed nominations encountered opposition in some way or another, was discussed in the assembly for the election to the Bulgarian throne, and a German prince, Alexander of Battenberg, was elected on 17 April 1879 and approved by the great powers and the Ottoman Sultan. Later, it was proposed that Carol I adopt Alexander to unite the two countries, but the German Empire and Austria-Hungary rejected the idea.

=== Bulgarian crisis of 1886–1887 ===
During Alexander's reign, relations between Bulgaria and Romania remained good, reinforced by their opposition to Russian influence. According to Brătianu, who had been in a meeting with Carol I (now King of Romania since 1881) and Alexander in May 1886, the latter suggested the creation of a Balkan confederation in which Carol I would be the head of state and commander-in-chief of the army. The reason for this was because of the negative reactions of Russia and other powers that followed the unification of Bulgaria and Eastern Rumelia in 1885, and the "liberation" of the region of Macedonia from Ottoman rule. Supposedly, this state would have two separate governments but a common military command in case of war. Brătianu communicated this to the Bulgarian diplomat Grigor Nachovich. Bulgaria later denied these claims, although the friendship between Bulgaria and Romania and the desire for a Balkan confederation was confirmed.

Between 1886 and 1887, Bulgaria faced a crisis as Russia accused Alexander of opposing it. This effectively divided Bulgaria between Russophobes (supporters of Alexander) and Russophiles (supporters of Russian policies). The crisis began on 9 August 1886, when Russophiles launched a coup that forced Alexander to abdicate, followed shortly after by another coup by Russophobes that restored him as monarch. Russia disapproved of these events, which made Alexander, who did not wish to rule facing Russian hostility, abdicate again on 25 August. Bulgaria, still controlled by Russophobes, had Stefan Stambolov taking power as the regents' leader. Between August 1886 and June 1887, a new search for a prince who could rule Bulgaria began. This made a personal union between Bulgaria and Romania possible again. Around 20 candidates were discussed, including the neighboring monarchs of Romania, Serbia and the Ottoman Empire, as well as Montenegro. Russia and Austria-Hungary disapproved of all of these candidates, fearing that their interests could be affected by the establishment of a large state in the region.

The press, politicians and citizens of Bulgaria received the Bulgarian–Romanian union initiative with enthusiasm. It was seen as an opportunity to break Russia's influence in the Balkans decisively. Still, Carol I was not among the leading candidates, although he was more popular than the sovereigns of Bulgaria's other neighbors. The regency, and especially Stambolov, supported initiatives for a Bulgarian–Romanian personal union. Negotiations were held in 1886 to determine how a dual Bulgarian–Romanian state would function. It was agreed that the country would be under the rule of Carol I and that ethnic Romanians would occupy the key positions of its ministry of defense. According to the Romanian historian Alex Mihai Stoenescu, this was supported by Germany, the United Kingdom and even Austria-Hungary at some point, although France stayed on the Russian side. Stoenescu thought this powerful Bulgarian–Romanian state, with control of the western Black Sea, could act as a buffer state, which, added to some other factors, could have even prevented World War I.

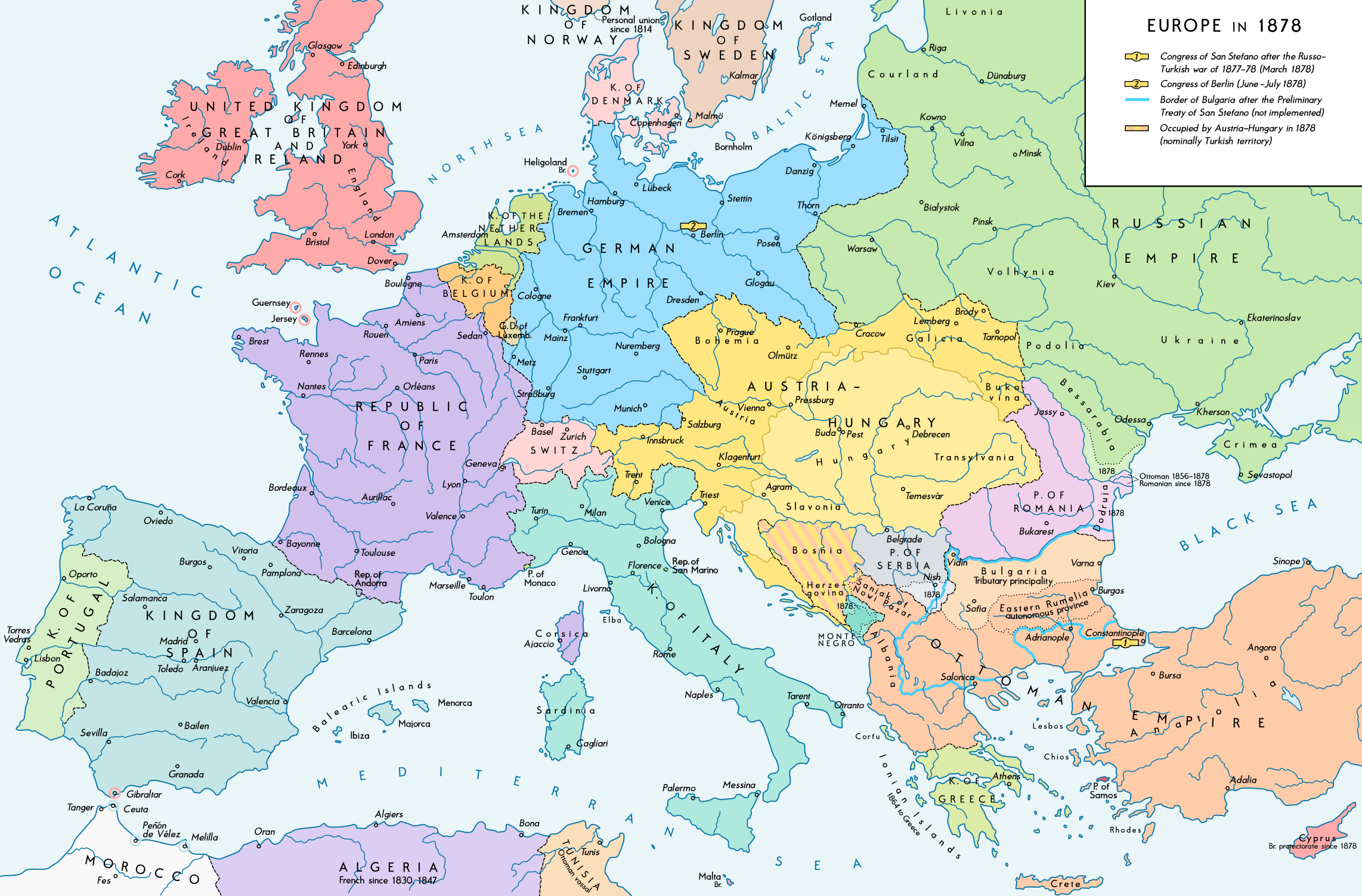
Political situation of Europe in the late 19th century, including Russia, Romania and Bulgaria

The regents hoped a union between Bulgaria and Romania would solve the crisis and be the first step towards a strongly anti-Russian wider Balkan confederation. Due to the great presence nationalism had in the Balkans during this epoch, this view is regarded as questionable by some historians. The regents turned to the British diplomat in Bulgaria, Frank Lascelles, since the United Kingdom vehemently defended the country's anti-Russian policies. He recommended them to abandon the idea since Carol I, being king of an independent country, would not accept the vassal status the title of Prince of Bulgaria still had towards the Ottoman Empire until 1908, when Bulgaria gained its independence. Stambolov began a new series of negotiations in October 1886 for a Bulgarian–Romanian confederation, this time with a single government; these extended into May 1887. Meanwhile, Russian actions in the two countries continued. On 4 September, there was an unsuccessful assassination attempt against Brătianu. It is thought that Russia could have been involved, since it happened shortly after the political events in Bulgaria. This prompted an aggressive response from the Romanian population, which began attacking newspaper editorial offices considered "Russian agents". As for Bulgaria, in November 1886, Russia broke relations with it until 1896.

Throughout the crisis, Romania adopted a neutral position because of the intensification of the great powers' struggle for influence in Bulgaria. It offered Alexander asylum but also allowed Russophiles behind the coup to enter the country. In late 1886, Carol I recommended that Bulgaria reconcile with Russia and choose a Bulgarian native as prince. According to Radev, Carol I was careful about his movements towards Bulgaria so as not to become a direct opponent of Russia. There was a chance the Romanians would oppose a union because of fear of Bulgarian influence on Romanian politics. Furthermore, a Romanian government minister whose identity was never revealed allegedly stated that a union could jeopardize Romanian control over Northern Dobruja, a region with a significant Bulgarian ethnic minority.

Following the Ottoman Sultan's rejection of a proposed Bulgarian–Turkish dual state after a new search for candidates to the throne in early 1887 started, the regents again turned towards Romania in February 1887. They first made another union proposal to the Romanian consul in Ruse and, on 27 February, Stambolov went to the Romanian embassy in Sofia and said he wanted to see Carol I as ruler of Bulgaria. However, Stambolov never made an official request as he thought the King of Romania would reject it for fear of offending the Triple Alliance. This was a secret alliance between Germany, Austria-Hungary and Italy, formed in 1882, which Romania had joined a year later. Russia's influence in the Balkan states further weakened after the Romanian political activist Zamfir Arbore published evidence for Russian espionage activity in Romania, which provoked outrage among other great powers.

After all of these events, Russia, which saw the possibility of the Romanian monarch taking the Bulgarian throne as a violation of the Treaty of Berlin, threatened on 10 June 1887 to break diplomatic relations with Romania. Carol I contacted German and Austro-Hungarian representatives, who informed him that Russia would invade Bulgaria and Romania if he accepted the Bulgarian crown at some point. Therefore, Carol I, despite his interest in a union with Bulgaria, informed Russia on 15 June that he would not accept a Bulgarian–Romanian state without Russian consent, thus ending the union project. In the end, Ferdinand of Saxe-Coburg and Gotha, who came from a German-speaking dynasty related to most European ruling houses at the time, was elected Prince of Bulgaria as Ferdinand I on 25 June 1887. This did not end the matter in Romania. On 16 July, in its 12th issue, the Romanian newspaper Sentinela published the article Unirea Bulgariei cu România în persoana Regelui Carol I ("The union of Bulgaria with Romania in person of King Carol I") about the Bulgarian idea of a dual state.

=== Communist period ===
The next and last time that a potential union involving Bulgaria and Romania was seriously considered was during the beginning of the communist period of their history. Bulgaria was officially a socialist state between 1946 and 1990, while Romania was officially one between 1947 and 1989. Since their appearance in the late 19th century, Balkan socialists had been particularly interested in the concept of a Balkan federation. Notable figures that supported this included several Bulgarian (Dimitar Blagoev, Christian Rakovsky, Yanko Sakazov) and Romanian (Constantin Dobrogeanu-Gherea) socialist leaders. Socialists saw unification as a potential solution to imperialism and nationalism in and over the Balkan countries and as an opportunity to begin a transition from capitalism to socialism in the region. Outside a socialist context, Balkan federal ideas had remained with some support for a few decades, but they lost much of it due to the outcome of the Balkan Wars and World War I, conflicts which divided the Balkans, including Bulgaria and Romania, into "winner" and "loser" countries. During them, Bulgaria and Romania had been in conflict in 1913, in the brief Second Balkan War in which Romania joined against Bulgaria and took Southern Dobruja; and between 1916 and 1918, when they fought on opposite sides during World War I, although there were no territorial changes between them this time.

These conflicts rendered any union proposal with the participation of both Bulgaria and Romania nearly impossible for years, with socialists remaining as some of the few people who continued to support similar ideas. Relations in the Balkans nevertheless began to improve after the war due to several events (such as the signing of the Kellogg–Briand Pact or the Great Depression), and, during the 1930s, conferences and the creation of the Balkan Entente in 1934 between Romania, Yugoslavia, Greece and Turkey reactivated the federation idea in the Balkans. Some non-socialist intellectuals and politicians, specially left-wing ones, continued to want Bulgarians and Romanians to establish a larger and more powerful state with other ones. For example, in 1936, the Romanian historian Victor Papacostea proposed a confederation under Romanian leadership that he called "Balkania" designed to solve regional conflicts. However, the only advances on the topic of a union in the Balkans were made under communist rule. It is in this period when Yugoslavia, which was a kingdom, became a socialist federal republic in 1945. Negotiations began between Yugoslavia and Bulgaria in late 1944 and early 1945 to establish a South Slavic federation. Albania and Romania were sometimes seen as countries that could eventually be influenced and included into a larger Balkan communist federation. However, the negotiations failed because of disputes over the region of Macedonia and discrepancies in the status of Bulgaria with respect to Yugoslavia. Negotiations between both began again in 1947 and early 1948, when a Balkan or Balkan–Danubian federation was proposed with the possibility of Romanian participation.

The pro-Soviet and pro-communist governments established in Bulgaria and Romania at the end of World War II somewhat improved the previously damaged relations between the two. In fact, when the war was still happening, Bulgaria recovered Southern Dobruja following the signing of the Treaty of Craiova, done under Nazi German pressure. When World War II ended, both countries were diplomatically isolated, subordinated to the Soviet Union and occupied by its army. The Soviet Union considered Romania as being in an "inferior" situation. This was probably due to the bad relations that Romania and the Soviet Union had during the interwar period and to the important Romanian contribution to the Nazi German invasion of the Soviet Union between 1941 and 1944. In comparison, during the war, Bulgaria had kept its army in the Balkans, avoiding any participation in the Eastern Front and limiting itself to collaborative operations on Axis-occupied lands in the Balkans. From the Soviet perspective, the priorities of the Bulgarians were more important, and their country was seen as an opportunity to expand Soviet interests over Romania, Greece and Turkey. This gave Bulgaria a "protagonist" role in the Balkans. Between Bulgaria and Romania, even if there continued to be national and political differences, the subject of federation was still active. In an interview with the Romanian journalist Gheorghe Zaharia in November 1946, the Bulgarian Prime Minister Georgi Dimitrov, who now ruled over a formal people's republic after a falsified September 1946 referendum, said Romania could join a possible future Balkan federation. This statement provoked the revocation of the initial permission given for Zaharia to publish the interview in the newspaper Scînteia since it angered Gheorghe Gheorghiu-Dej, leader of the Romanian Communist Party (PCR). The reason for this reaction was probably the desire not to irritate the Soviet Union.

On 12 July 1947, a meeting in Sofia between Bulgarian and Romanian governmental officials was organized. The leaders of both countries, Dimitrov (Bulgaria) and Petru Groza (Romania), discussed a rapprochement, with Groza saying "these Chinese walls" (referring to the borders) had to be torn down to "get to know the neighboring peoples better", perhaps subtly suggesting a union. During the meeting, Gheorghe Tătărescu, then Romania's Minister of Foreign Affairs, said "Nothing separates us anymore. We have no contrary interest and I see only one policy: of collaboration and understanding". Romania's diplomatic and political situation worsened after the abdication of its king, Michael I, on 30 December 1947, day in which the Romanian People's Republic was declared. Romania was now even more isolated and institutionally incompetent than before. Under these circumstances, Bulgarian influence over Romania increased, and Romanian communists started to study and even imitate the Bulgarian communist regime. The Romanian Communist Party press began to idealize the Bulgarian leader, mention Bulgarian achievements and talk about the benefits that a union between the two could bring. However, during this period, there were no proposals or suggestions of a union from any Romanian official.

Map of the Eastern Bloc in Europe, including the Soviet Union and its satellite states

On 15 and 16 January 1948, during Dimitrov's visit to Bucharest, the Bulgarian–Romanian Treaty of Friendship, Cooperation and Mutual Assistance was signed. The actual motivation behind this treaty could have been the hope for a Bulgarian–Romanian union. While on his visit, Dimitrov wanted to speak to the Romanian lawyer and journalist Petre Pandrea. Pandrea, a relative of the communist activist Lucrețiu Pătrășcanu, felt Romania should advocate for neutrality, with Switzerland being the example to follow and thus supporting the concept of "Helvetization". Dimitrov supported the application of his ideas to all of the Balkans and later spoke the German-language phrase Dreimal Schweiz! ("three times Switzerland!"). Pandrea was later convicted of being involved in a plot to attempt "the Helvetization of Romania" in 1959. Once imprisoned, he said that what Dimitrov meant was the incorporation of the concept of neutrality in Romania, Bulgaria and Yugoslavia. According to the Bulgarian historian Blagovest Nyagulov, this can also be interpreted as the subsequent federalization of the three countries following the Swiss model.

When Dimitrov returned from Bucharest, he gave a press conference during which he proposed a Balkan and Danubian confederation, including Bulgaria and Romania, which Poland and Czechoslovakia could later join. The leader of the Soviet Union, Joseph Stalin, called this statement harmful to Moscow. The newspaper Pravda criticized Dimitrov's words on 18 January and on 10 February. Later, a meeting was organized with Bulgarian, Soviet and Yugoslav representatives during which Dimitrov said, likely insincerely, that his statements were "harmful and wrong" and that he would not repeat them. The reason for this Soviet reaction was probably to ensure control over its satellite states and because Dimitrov's proposal could serve the United States' opposition to the emerging Eastern Bloc. Stalin precluded and was against the possibility of a federation between Bulgaria and Romania or the improvement of relations between the two. According to him, a union between the two countries was "unthinkable" and "stupid" since there were not "any Bulgarian–Romanian historical ties", repeating the Russian opposition to a Bulgarian–Romanian union once again.

In the end, any attempt at a federation involving Bulgaria and Romania died out. Soviet influence over Romania increased significantly in late 1947 and early 1948, and the Tito–Stalin split later in 1948 forced Bulgaria and Yugoslavia to renounce a potential South Slavic federation.

== Conclusion ==
=== Failure ===
Map of the European Union

Over time, the idea of federalizing the Balkans faded. The Balkan Wars and World War I overshadowed the possibility and fueled nationalism and geopolitical conflicts. The main achievement of the Balkan federalist movements was the federation implemented in socialist Yugoslavia. However, the dissolution of this state in the 1990s was violent and dramatic, making a pan-Balkan federation even less popular and reinforcing the idea of culturally and ethnically homogeneous nation states.

Problems regarding the idea of federation also arose between Bulgaria and Romania. Although both countries shared Orthodox Christianity, strong economic and cultural ties and a desire for independence from the Ottomans, nationalism and the intervention of external powers poisoned the friendship between them. Shortly before World War II, they were filled with ethnic and territorial hostilities. During the communist era, although their relations improved, Bulgaria and Romania followed different foreign policies, as the former was loyal to the Soviet Union while the latter sought greater autonomy from it.

According to Nyagulov, there are several reasons a Bulgarian–Romanian union failed to materialize. Unionist proposals always came from the Bulgarian side, since Romania would give Bulgaria certain political advantages. However, their national priorities were not the same. The Bulgarians focused on the Balkans, while the Romanians focused on Central Europe. Furthermore, these projects were launched in an attempt to be liberated and independent and not because of any real interest in each other, and the model of a nation state and territorial claims over other countries, which were not unusual in the region, made a possible acceptance of a union proposal more difficult. Another important reason was the strong opposition from the great powers to a Bulgarian–Romanian union that occurred on several occasions, such as in 1878 and 1879, when Austria-Hungary and Russia objected to the nomination of Romanian candidates for the Bulgarian throne; in 1886 and 1887, when the same countries opposed the election of a monarch from Bulgaria's neighbors and Russia threatened to invade Bulgaria and Romania if the Romanian monarch tried to take the Bulgarian crown; and in 1947 and 1948, when Romania rejected any federative proposal with any other country to avoid Soviet disapproval and the Bulgarian leader was recriminated for his federative ideas. This fierce opposition, especially from Russia (or the Soviet Union), was probably because of a fear of a strong and influential state that could compete against the great powers, following the "divide and rule" principle. Even without external influence, some Bulgarians and Romanians opposed a possible union.

After the fall of the communist regimes in 1989, old and new disagreements emerged between Bulgaria and Romania. Nevertheless, the accession of both countries to the European Union in 2007 has strengthened their relations and cooperation between them. For example, in 2011, Bulgarian Prime Minister Boyko Borisov proposed buying jointly fighter aircraft with Romania, Turkey and Croatia. Nickolay Mladenov, the Bulgarian Minister of Foreign Affairs, went a step further by proposing to unify Bulgaria's air and naval forces with those of Romania. Many politicians and military experts have made similar suggestions because doing so would make maintenance of aircraft and pilot training cheaper.

The efforts to effect European integration in the Balkans have provoked comments on a possible federation once again. The European Union and its democratic values impose common visions for the development of its various societies, which could also include a future federation proposal on the region according to Nyagulov.

=== Comparison ===
The following is a comparison between modern-day Bulgaria and Romania, based on recent years rather than the 19th and 20th centuries for convenience and data accessibility. Demographic data has been taken from each country's 2011 census, while economic, geographic and military data originates from the information available on 30 March 2021 on CIA's reference resource The World Factbook.

Comparison between Bulgaria and Romania
Statistics	Bulgaria	Romania
Population (2011)	7,364,570	20,121,641
Area	110,879 km^{2} (42,811 mi^{2})	238,391 km^{2} (92,043 mi^{2})
Density (2011)	66.42/km^{2} (172.03/sq mi)	84.41/km^{2} (218.61/sq mi)
Ethnic composition (2011) (Note: The number of people whose ethnicity has been registered in the 2011 censuses is 6,611,513 (out of 7,364,570) in Bulgaria and around 18,884,800 (out of 20,121,641) in Romania.)	Bulgarians (84.8%), Turks (8.8%), Romani people (4.9%), others (1.5%)	Romanians (88.9%), Hungarians (6.5%), Romani (3.3%) others (1.3%)
Capital	Sofia	Bucharest
Coastline	354 km (220 mi)	225 km (140 mi)
Elevation	Average: 472 m (1,549 ft); Lowest: 0 m (0 ft), Black Sea; Highest: 2,925 m (9,596 ft), Musala	Average: 414 m (1,358 ft); Lowest: 0 m (0 ft), Black Sea; Highest: 2,544 m (8,346 ft), Moldoveanu
Currency	Euro (EUR)	Leu (RON)
GDP (2019 estimate)	PPP: $162 billion Nominal: $68.5 billion	PPP: $580 billion Nominal: $250 billion
Military size (2020 estimate)	Around 32,000 active personnel	Around 65,000 active personnel

== See also ==
- Bulgaria–Romania relations
- Greek–Yugoslav confederation
- Union of Hungary and Romania
- Intermarium
- List of proposed state mergers
