= Bulgaria–Romania border =

International border

Bulgaria–Romania border Граница между България и Румъния Granița între Bulgaria și România
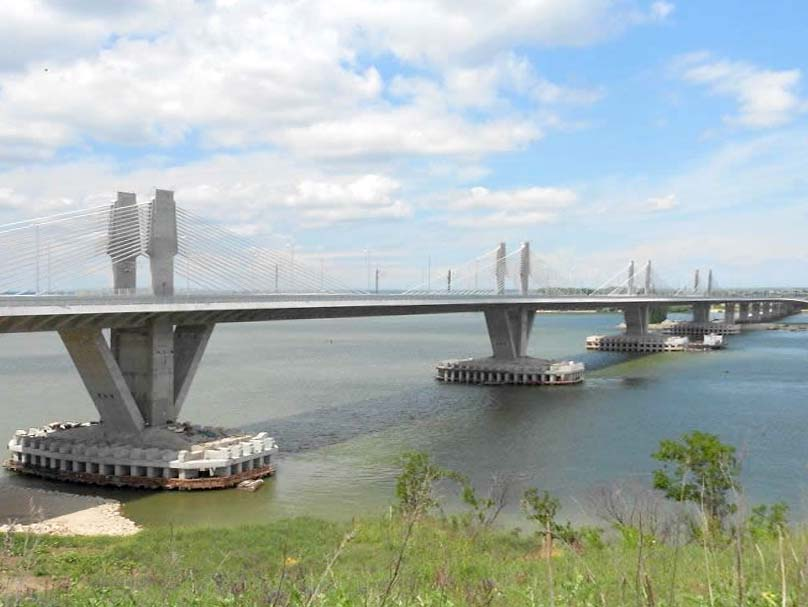
- New Europe Bridge between Vidin/Bulgaria and Calafat/Romania

Characteristics
- Entities: Bulgaria Romania
- Length: 631.3 kilometers

History
- Established: 1878; Signing of the Treaty of San Stefano at the end of the Russo-Turkish War (1877–1878)
- Current shape: 1940; Treaty of Craiova
- Treaties: Treaty of San Stefano (1878); Treaty of Berlin (1878); Protocol of St. Petersburg (1913); Treaty of Bucharest (1913); Treaty of Bucharest (1918); Treaty of Neuilly-sur-Seine (1919); Treaty of Craiova (1940); Paris Peace Treaties (1947)

The Bulgaria–Romania border (Bulgarian: Граница между България и Румъния, romanized: Granitsa mezhdu Bŭlgariya i Rumŭniya, Romanian: Frontiera între Bulgaria și România) is the state border between Bulgaria and Romania.

For most of its length, the border follows the course of the lower Danube, up until the town of Silistra. From Silistra, the river continues north into the Romanian territory. East of that point, the land border passes through the historical region of Dobruja, dividing it into Northern Dobruja in Romania and Southern Dobruja in Bulgaria. The land border was first set in Article XLVI of the Treaty of San Stefano (signed in Berlin on July 13, 1878), as "a line starting from the east of Silistra and terminating on the Black Sea, south of Mangalia." It was subsequently revised in several treaties, and eventually confirmed at the Paris Peace Treaties on February 10, 1947.

The Bulgaria–Romania border has been an internal border of the European Union since 1 January 2007 when Romania and Bulgaria became EU members. Since both countries fully joined the Schengen Area on 1 January 2025, border controls have been formally abolished.

== Border crossings ==
- Vidin–Calafat (New Europe Bridge): road, railway
- Oryahovo-Bechet: ferry
- Nikopol-Turnu Măgurele: ferry
- Svishtov-Zimnicea: ferry
- Ruse–Giurgiu (Danube Bridge): road, railway
- Silistra–Ostrov: road
- Kaynardzha–Lipnița: road
- Krushari–Dobromir: road
- Kardam–Negru Vodă: road, railway
- Durankulak–Vama Veche: road

== Maps ==
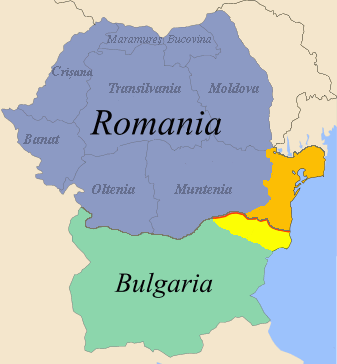
Bulgarian-Romanian border in Dobruja (in red)

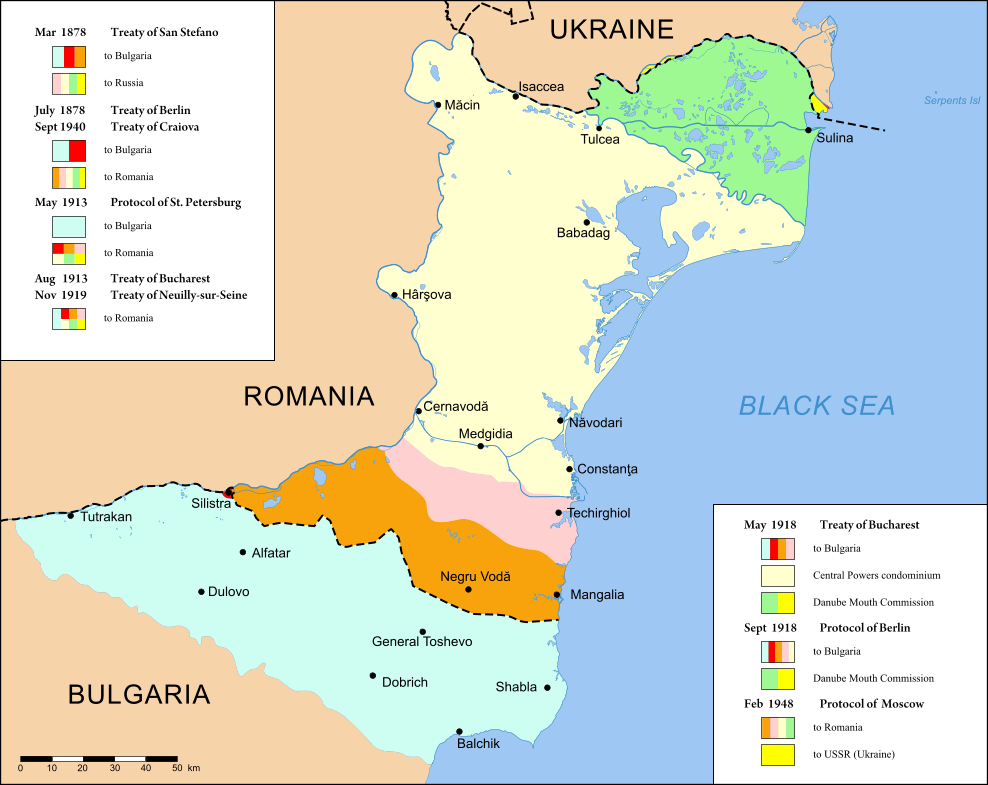
Border changes in Dobruja since 1878

== See also ==
- Bulgaria–Romania relations
- Union of Bulgaria and Romania
