= Badushtnost =

Bilingual newspaper publicated in Romania by Bulgarians

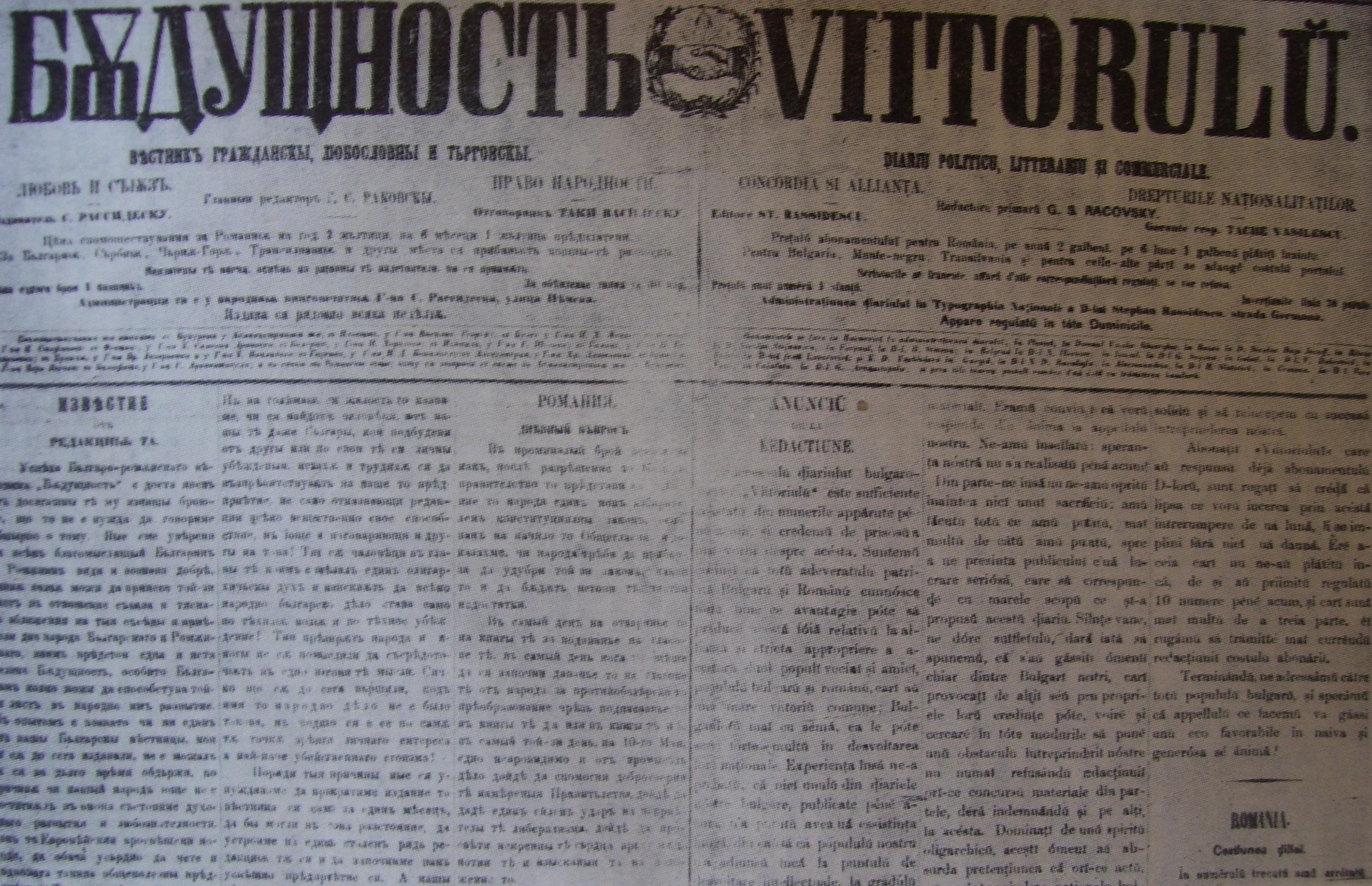
- Issue 10 from 17 May 1864
- Type: Weekly newspaper
- Editor: Georgi Rakovski
- Founded: 8 March 1864
- Language: Bulgarian, Romanian
- Ceased publication: 17 May 1864

Badushtnost (Bulgarian: Бъдущност, romanized: Bŭdushtnost; Romanian: Viitorulŭ; both meaning "The Future") was a bilingual weekly newspaper published in Bucharest, in the Romanian United Principalities, in 1864 by Georgi Rakovski. The first issue came out on March 8 on the same year from Ștefan Rasidescu's printing house in Kazanlak, just like the other nine issues. The funds for printing the newspaper were procured by shareholders from the Bulgarian emigrants in Romania with assistance from the government of Mihail Kogălniceanu. The newspaper was distributed in Alexandria, Giurgiu and other Romanian cities, as well as in Bulgarian lands despite the prohibitions by the Ottoman authorities.

In Badushtnost, Rakovski published articles and comments regarding the problem of the Bulgarian Orthodox Church, directed against the efforts of the Ecumenical Patriarchate of Constantinople to convulse the Bulgarians. He talked about the Megali Idea and advocated for equality and unity between the Balkan peoples to resolve the Eastern Question. He actively supported the reform efforts of Kogălniceanu and the Prince Alexandru Ioan Cuza: the seizure of church property, the landowning of the Romanian peasants and the democratization of the electoral law. Rakovski considered these changes favorable for the Bulgarians.

Rakovski also claimed to defend the rights of the Bulgarians and Romanians against the Ottoman Empire and the Ecumenical Patriarchate of Constantinople, and advocated rapprochement between the two peoples. He himself was a supporter of a union of Bulgaria and Romania, and future historians have declared that he sought a "Bulgarian–Vlach dualism" model.

From the very beginning, Badushtnost encountered financial difficulties and obstacles from Hristo Georgiev, Georgi Atanasovich and other wealthy Bulgarians in Romania who did not share Rakovski's revolutionary thoughts and support for Cuza's reforms. At the end, the lack of funds led to the closure of the newspaper in May 1864.
