= Treaty of Bucharest (1918) =

Peace treaty between Kingdom of Romania and the Central Powers

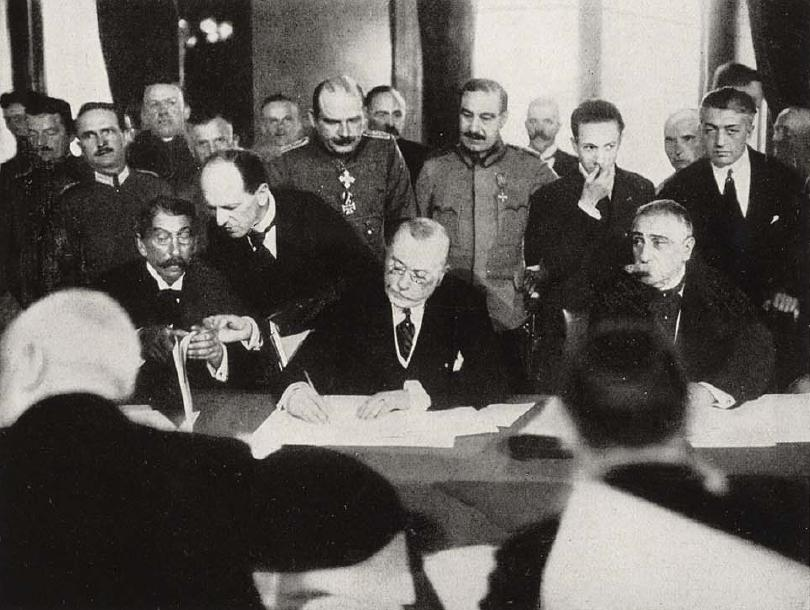
- Romanian prime minister Alexandru Marghiloman signing the treaty
- Signed: 7 May 1918
- Location: Cotroceni Palace, Bucharest, Kingdom of Romania (Note: Under Central Powers' occupation since December 1916)
- Condition: Ratification by Romania and the Central Powers
- Signatories: (German Empire) Richard von Kühlmann; (German Empire) Paul von Koerner; (German Empire) Johannes Kriege; (German Empire) Generalmajor Emil Hell; (German Empire) Kapitän zur See Hans Bene; (Austria-Hungary) Stephan Burián von Rajecz; (Tsardom of Bulgaria (1908–1946)) Vasil Radoslavov; (Tsardom of Bulgaria (1908–1946)) Dimitar Tonchev; (Tsardom of Bulgaria (1908–1946)) Major General Zanttloff; (Tsardom of Bulgaria (1908–1946)) Lyubomir Miletich; (Ottoman Empire) Ahmed Nessimy Bey; (Ottoman Empire) Ahmed Izzet Pasha; (Ottoman Empire) Hikmet Bey; (Kingdom of Romania) Alexandru Marghiloman; (Kingdom of Romania) Constantin C. Arion; (Kingdom of Romania) Ion Papiniu; (Kingdom of Romania) Mihail Burghele
- Parties: German Empire; Austria-Hungary; Ottoman Empire; (Tsardom of Bulgaria (1908–1946)) Bulgaria; (Kingdom of Romania) Romania
- Languages: German, Romanian, Hungarian, Bulgarian, Ottoman Turkish

The Treaty of Bucharest (1918) was a peace treaty between Romania and the opposing Central Powers following the stalemate reached after the campaign of 1917. This left Romania isolated after Russia's unilateral exit from World War I (see the Armistice of Focșani and Treaty of Brest-Litovsk).

Following the Central Powers' ultimatum issued during the meeting between King Ferdinand I of Romania and Austro-Hungarian Foreign Minister Ottokar Czernin on 27 February [O.S. 14 February] 1918 at the Răcăciuni railway station, Ferdinand summoned a Crown Council on 2 March [O.S. 17 February] in Iași, the Romanian capital-in-exile. After long and difficult discussions, which lasted three days, and despite the strong opposition of Queen Marie and General Constantin Prezan, the Crown Council decided to accept the ultimatum and send envoys to Buftea to negotiate a preliminary peace treaty. The preliminary peace treaty was concluded on 5 March [O.S. 20 February] 1918, by which Romania agreed to border rectifications in favor of Austria-Hungary, to cede the whole of Dobruja to Bulgaria, to demobilize at least eight divisions, to evacuate the Austro-Hungarian territory still in its possession, and to allow the transport of Central Powers troops through Western Moldavia and Bessarabia towards Odessa.

Alexandru Marghiloman, then Prime Minister of Romania, signed the final treaty at the Cotroceni Palace, Bucharest, on 7 May [O.S. 24 April] 1918. It was ratified by the Chamber of Deputies on 28 June and by the Senate on 4 July 1918. However, King Ferdinand refused to sign or promulgate it.

== Terms ==
- Romania and the Central Powers declared the end of the state of war between them and that the diplomatic and consular relations between them would be resumed.
- Demobilization of the Romanian forces
  - Of Romania's 15 infantry divisions, divisions 11th to 15th were to be disbanded. Of the remaining 10 infantry divisions, the two in Bessarabia were allowed to remain on a war footing, together with the Vânători battalions left over from the disbanded Vânători divisions, and the two Romanian cavalry divisions. These would remain active until the military operations carried out by the Central Powers in Ukraine would eliminate the danger at the Romanian eastern frontier. The remaining eight divisions would remain on a reduced peace footing: four infantry regiments of three battalions each, two cavalry regiments of two squadrons each, two field artillery regiments of seven batteries each, one battalion of pioneers and the necessary technical troops and convoys. The total force of these eight infantry divisions could not exceed 20,000 men, that of the cavalry 3,200 men and that of the artillery 9,000 men. The divisions in Bessarabia were also to be decreased, in case of demobilization, to the same peace footing as the other eight divisions mentioned above.
  - The ordnance, machine guns, small arms, horses, wagons, and munitions made available by the reduction or disbanding of Romanian troops were to be transferred to Central Powers and to be guarded by Romanian depot troops. Ammunition left with the Romanian divisions on peace footing was limited to 250 cartridges per rifle, 2,500 cartridges per machine gun, and 150 rounds for each piece of ordnance. The divisions in Bessarabia were allowed to retain the ammunition needed for the state of war.
  - The demobilized troops were to remain in Moldavia until the evacuation of the occupied Romanian territory by the Central Powers, with the exception of the depot troops mentioned at article V. The troops in active service had to secure the permission of the Central Powers' high command if they wanted to pass into the occupied territory.
  - Romania and the Central Powers would each appoint an officer from their respective General Staffs as liaison officer to the other party.
  - The Romanian fluvial and maritime forces were allowed to remain intact until the conditions in Bessarabia were cleared up; afterwards they were to be reduced to a peace footing status, except for the fluvial and naval forces needed to protect the commercial navigation and the reestablishment of navigable lanes. The military and naval personnel who in peace time was employed in the ports and in navigation were to be demobilized first, so that they could resume their former activity.
- Cession of Romanian territory
  - Romania returned Southern Dobruja (the Cadrilater) and ceded the southern part of Northern Dobruja (see the maps) to Bulgaria. The rest of the province (starting south of Cernavodă-Constanța railroad up to the Danube and the Sfântu Gheorghe branch, thus leaving the Danube Delta to Romania) was ceded by Romania to the Central Powers and thus remained under joint Central Powers control. The Central Powers guaranteed the commercial road to the Black Sea for Romania by way of Cernavodă and Constanța.
  - Romania gave to Austria-Hungary control of the passes of the Carpathian Mountains (see the maps).
  - State properties in the territories ceded by Romania passed without indemnity to the acquiring states. The acquiring states were to enter with Romania into agreements over the rights of option and emigration for the Romanian inhabitants in the ceded territories, the apportionment of the properties of the communal districts severed by the new frontiers, the attribution of archives, of judicial, administrative, and personal civil records, the management of the new frontiers, and the effect of the new frontiers upon dioceses and political treaties.
- All parties renounced war indemnities, except for special agreements regarding the regulation of war damages.
- Romania leased its oil fields around Ploiești to Germany for 90 years.
- The Central Powers recognized the Union of Bessarabia with Romania.
- The German and Austrian occupation of Romania was to continue until a date "later to be determined".
- All of occupation costs were to be paid by Romania.
- All of Romania's "surplus" agricultural production was to be handed over to Austria-Hungary and Germany, with an Austro-German commission deciding what was "surplus" and what price was paid.
- All railroads, telephones, telegraphs, and postal systems in Romania were to remain under the control of Germany and Austria-Hungary.
- German civil servants with the power to veto decisions by Romanian cabinet ministers and to fire Romanian civil servants were appointed to oversee every Romanian ministry, in effect stripping Romania of its independence.

== Aftermath ==
The treaty put Romania in a unique situation compared to other German-occupied countries. It completely respected Romania's de jure independence, and Romania ended up with more territory after the union with Bessarabia, though the requirement that German civil servants with the power of veto power be stationed in Bucharest together with the German occupation to continue until a date "later be determined", effectively turned Romania into a de facto German protectorate.

Germany was able to repair the Ploiești oil fields and by the end of the war had pumped a million tons of oil. They also requisitioned two million tons of grain from Romanian farmers. These materials were vital in keeping Germany in the war to the end of 1918.

Although Bulgaria received a part of Northern Dobruja, the fact that it could not annex the whole province had a strong effect on the Bulgarian public opinion. Bulgarian Prime Minister Vasil Radoslavov was forced to resign on 16 June 1918 after the failure to acquire the whole of Dobruja. Nevertheless, Bulgaria continued to lobby Germany and Austria-Hungary for the annexation of the whole province, including the condominium established by the Treaty of Bucharest. Representatives of Bulgarian Dobrujans held a second general assembly in Babadag on 23 September, adopting a final resolution requesting Dobruja's incorporation into Bulgaria. After negotiations, a protocol regarding the transfer of the jointly administered zone in Northern Dobruja to Bulgaria was signed in Berlin on 24 September 1918, by Germany, Austria-Hungary, the Ottoman Empire, and Bulgaria. In return, Bulgaria agreed to cede the left bank of the Maritsa river to Turkey. The protocol was deemed a desperate attempt by the Central Powers to keep Bulgaria on their side during the Vardar Offensive on the Macedonian front. In the end, the agreement was short-lived: five days later, on 29 September, Bulgaria capitulated in the face of the advancing Allied forces (see also the Armistice of Salonica).

The treaty was denounced in October 1918 by the Marghiloman government. Romania re-entered the war on 10 November 1918, the day before it ended in Western Europe, and the 1918 Treaty of Bucharest was nullified by the Armistice of 11 November 1918. In 1919, Germany was forced in the Treaty of Versailles to renounce all the benefits provided by the 1918 Treaty of Bucharest. The territorial transfers to Austria-Hungary and Bulgaria were annulled by the Treaty of Saint-Germain-en-Laye (1919), and the Treaty of Neuilly-sur-Seine (1919), respectively; and the Treaty of Trianon (1920) settled Romania's border with Hungary.

== Maps ==
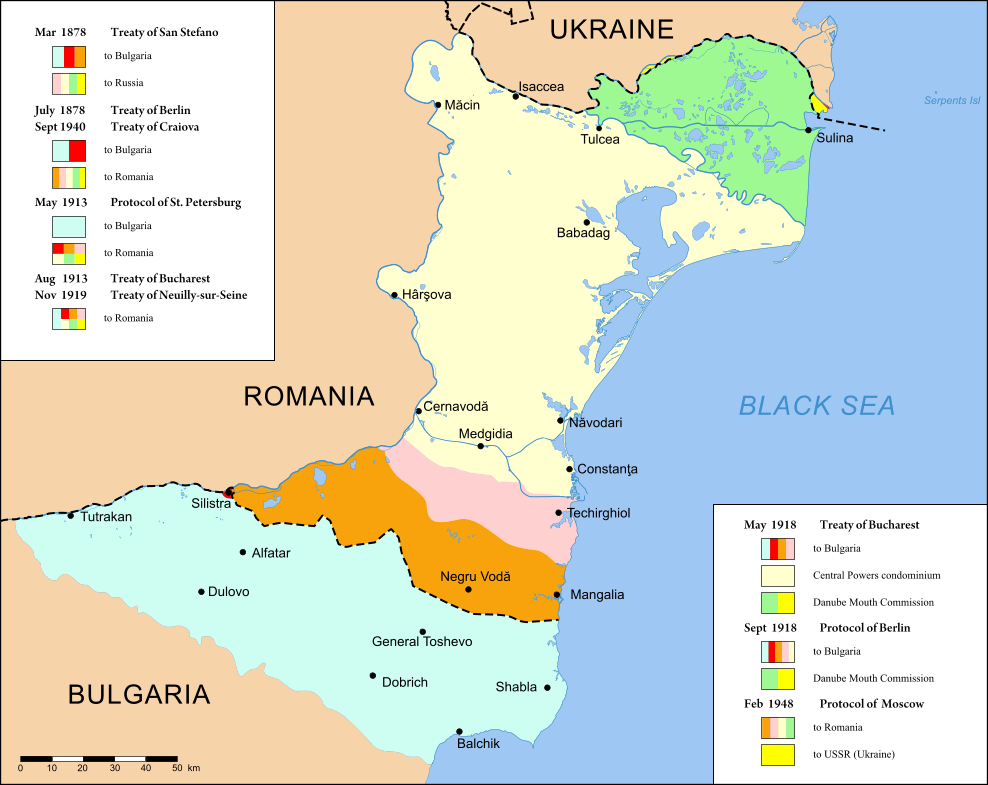
Map of Dobruja (areas in light blue, orange and pink were annexed by Bulgaria, while the area in yellow was to be administered jointly by the Central Powers)

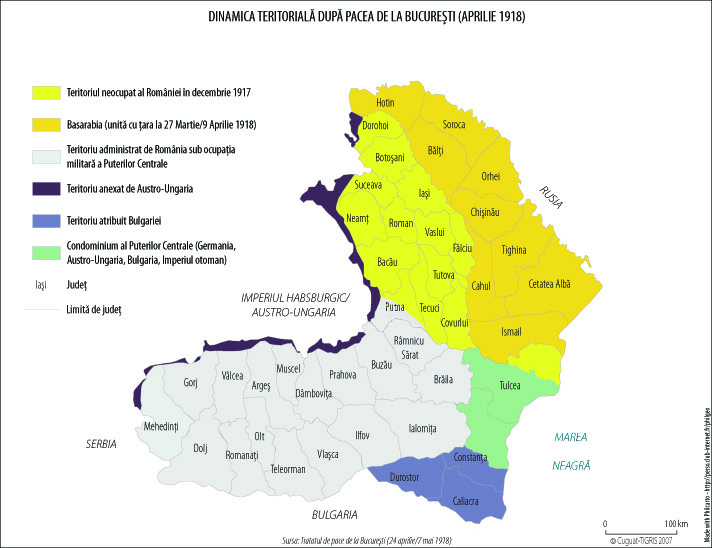
Romanian territories ceded to Austria-Hungary (purple), Bulgaria (blue), and the Central Powers (green) through the Treaty of Bucharest. These changes were reversed by the Treaty of Versailles.

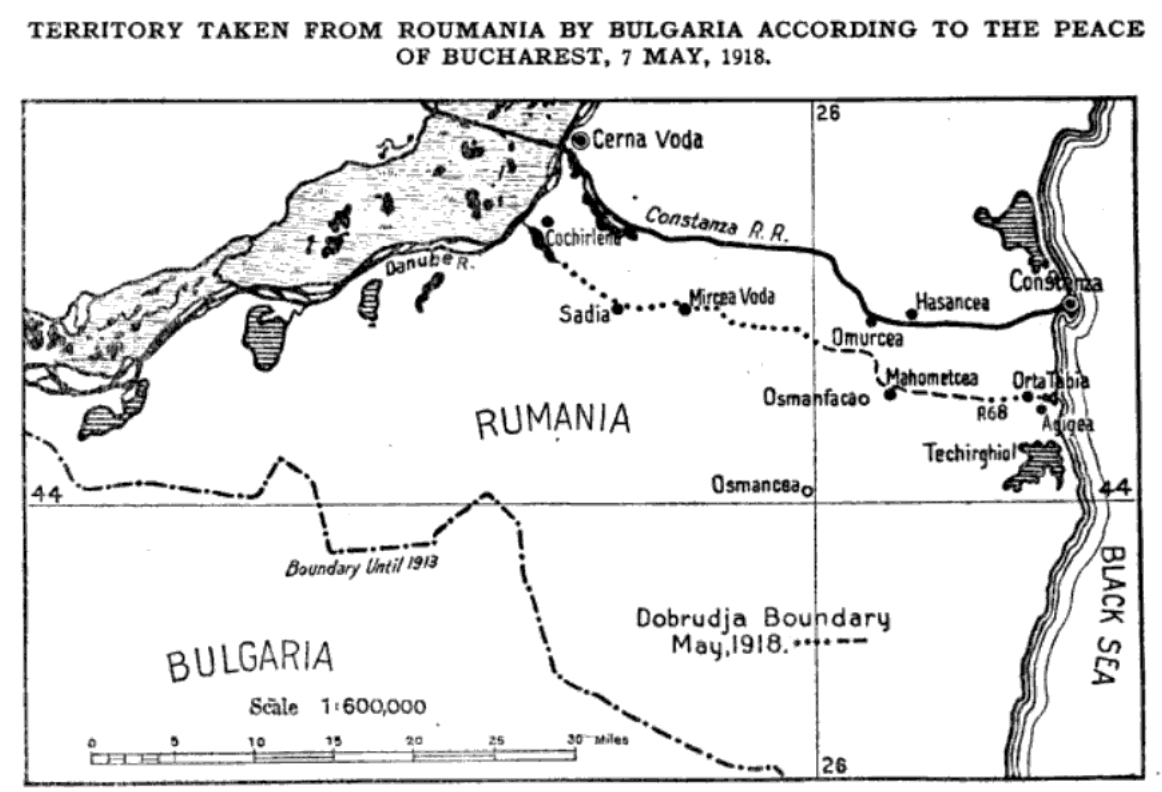
The Bulgaria–Romania border in Dobruja according to the Treaty (source: US Department of State, 1918)

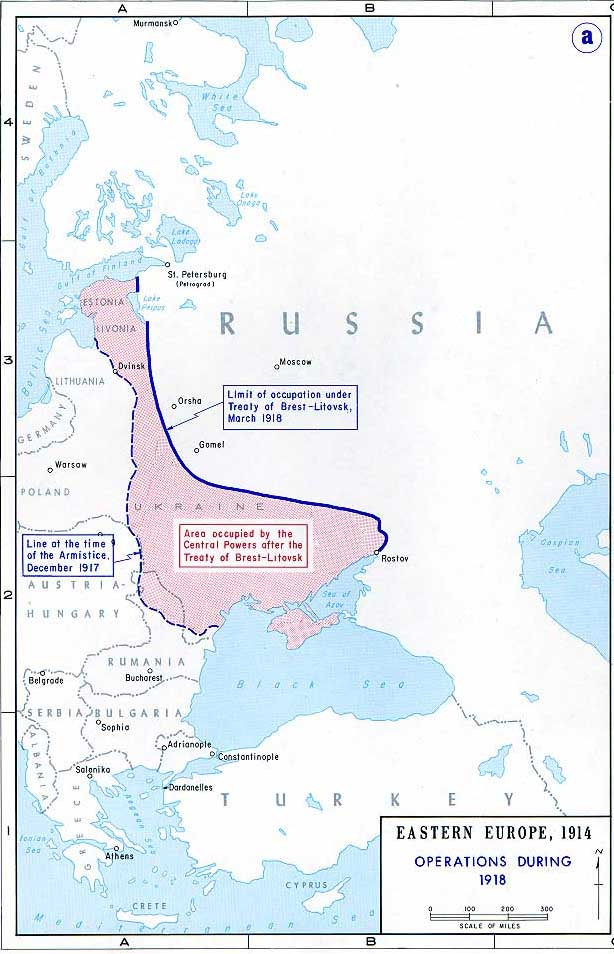
The situation on the Eastern Front in March 1918 (after the completion of the Operation Faustschlag)

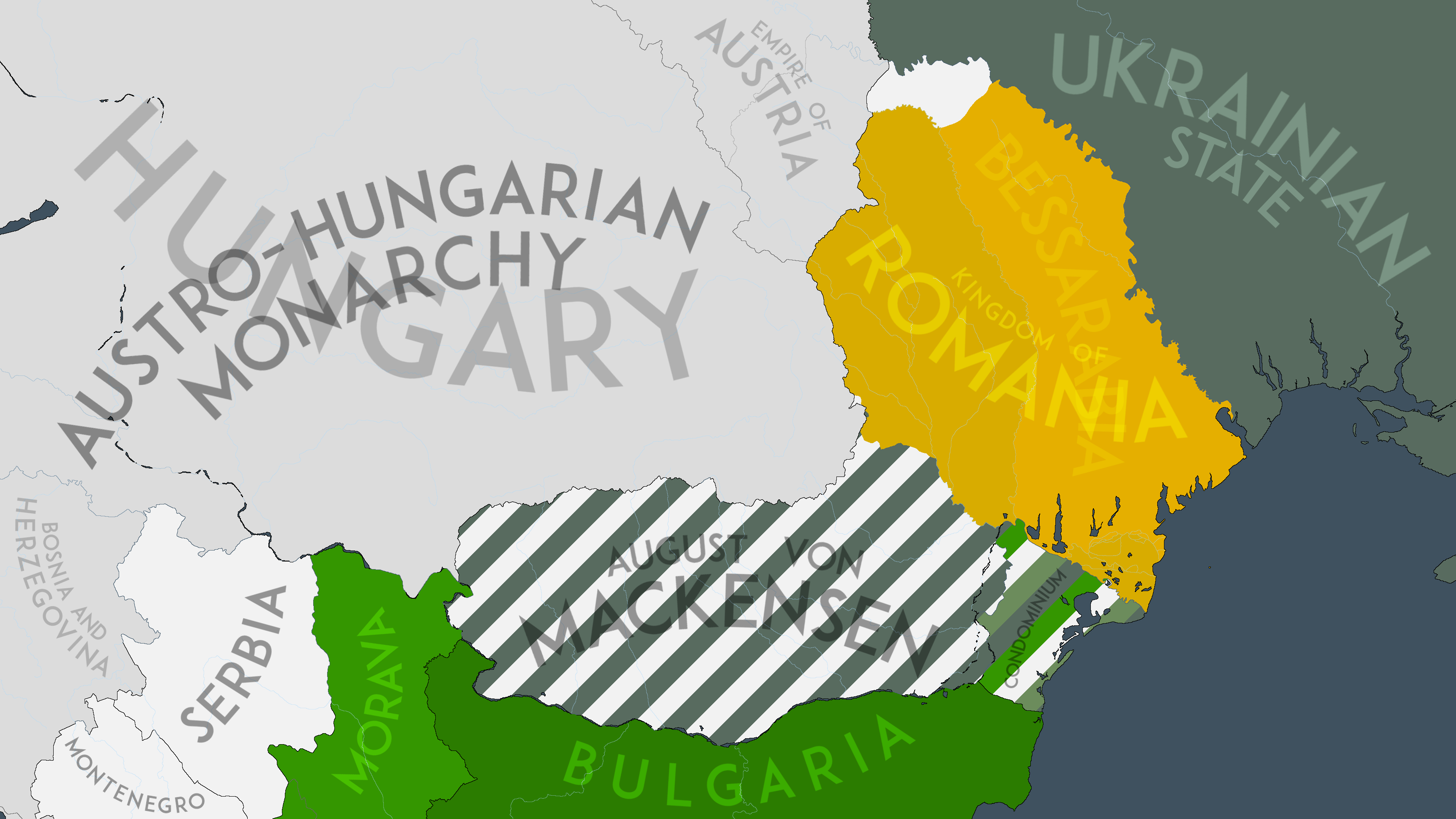
Romania on 7 May 1918, after the Treaty of Bucharest. The Treaty, while signed by Prime Minister Alexandru Marghiloman, was never ratified by King Ferdinand I.

== Image gallery ==
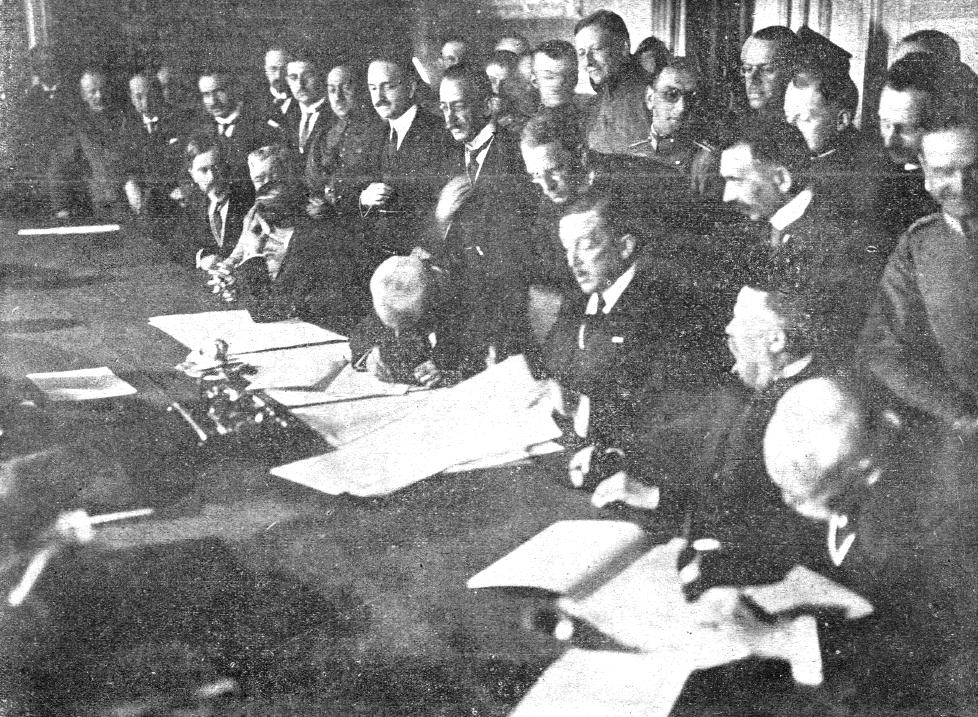
Foreign Minister of Austria-Hungary, Stephan Burián von Rajecz, signing the treaty

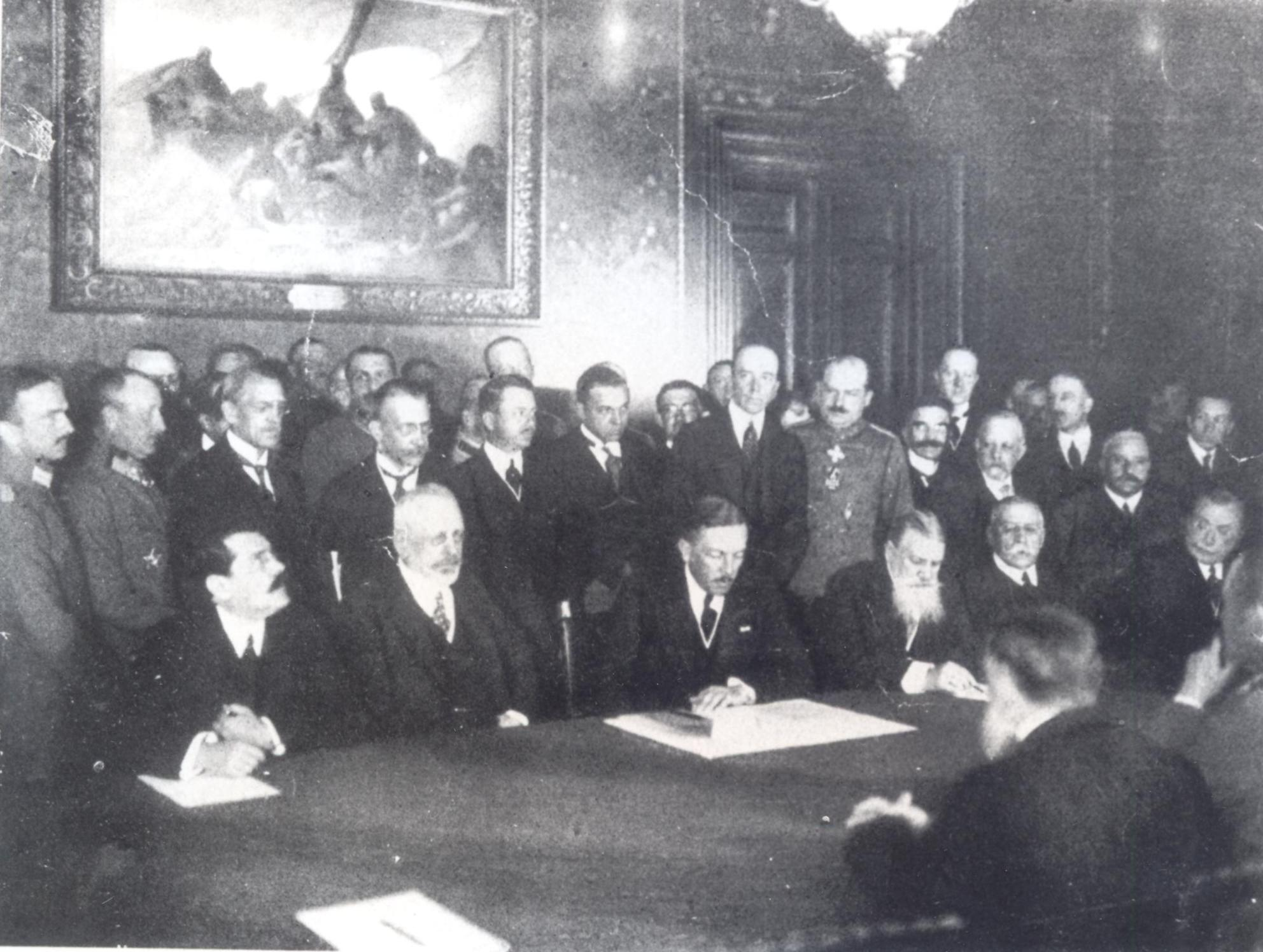
Picture taken at the signing of the treaty (Bulgarian State Archives). Bulgarian Prime Minister Vasil Radoslavov is fourth from the left, sitting.

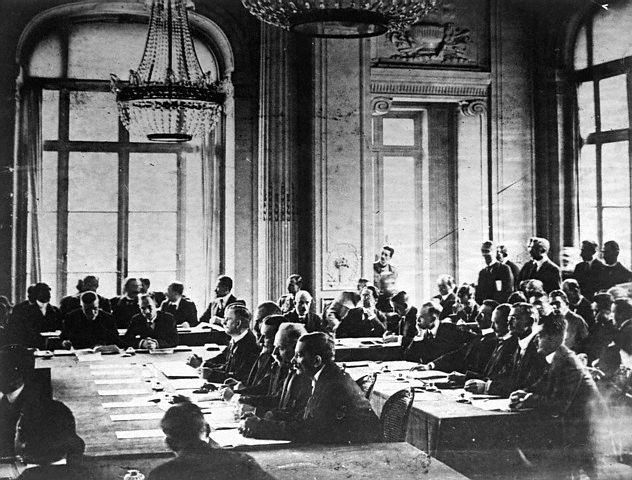
Delegates at the signing of the treaty

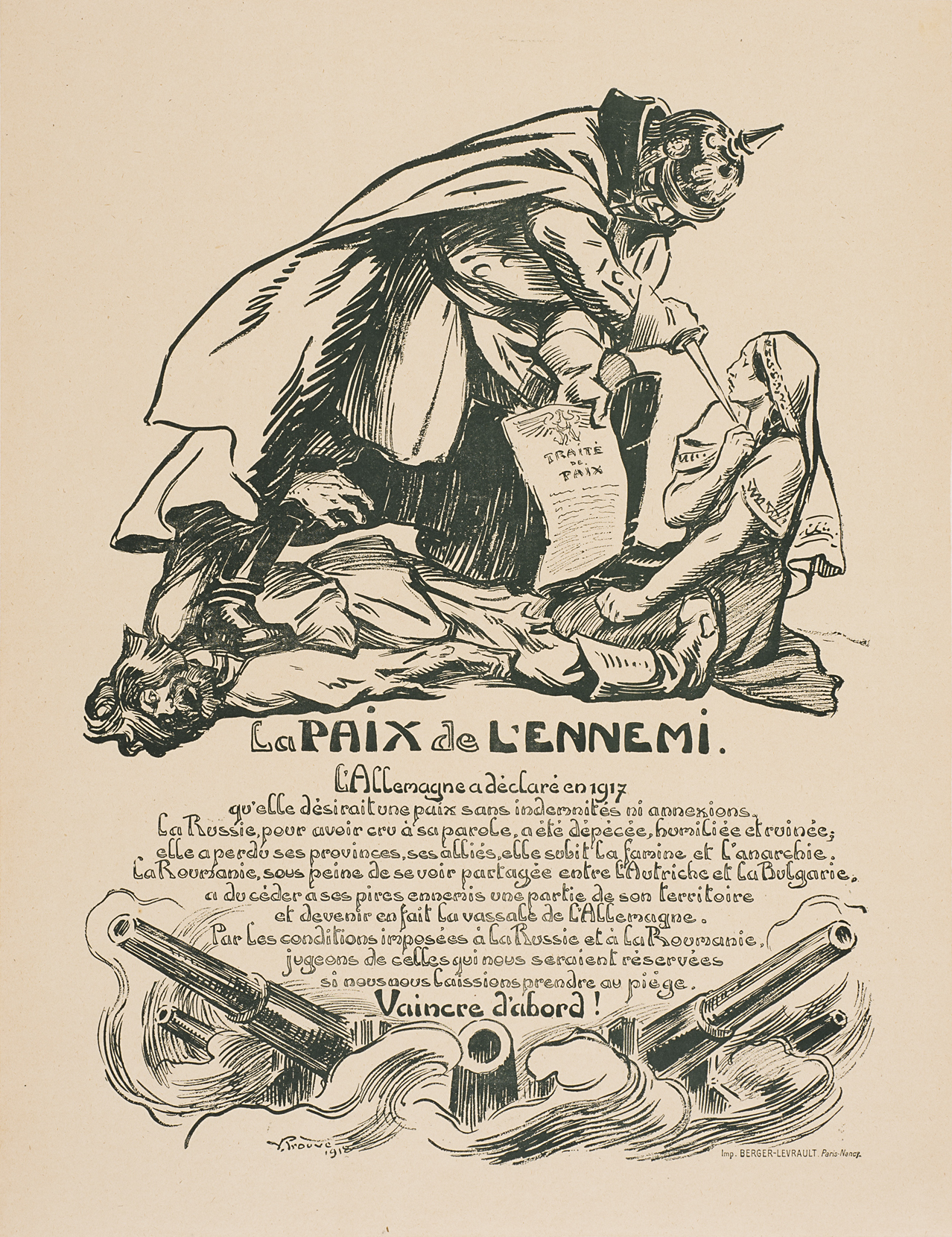
French caricature on the Romanian-German peace: Kaiser Wilhelm II pointing a dagger at a woman (Romania), while showing her the terms of the treaty and stepping on the throat of a man (Russia)

== See also ==
- Romania during World War I
- Treaty of Bucharest (1812)
- Treaty of Bucharest (1913)
- Treaty of Bucharest (1916)
