= Population exchange between Bulgaria and Romania =

1940 population exchange

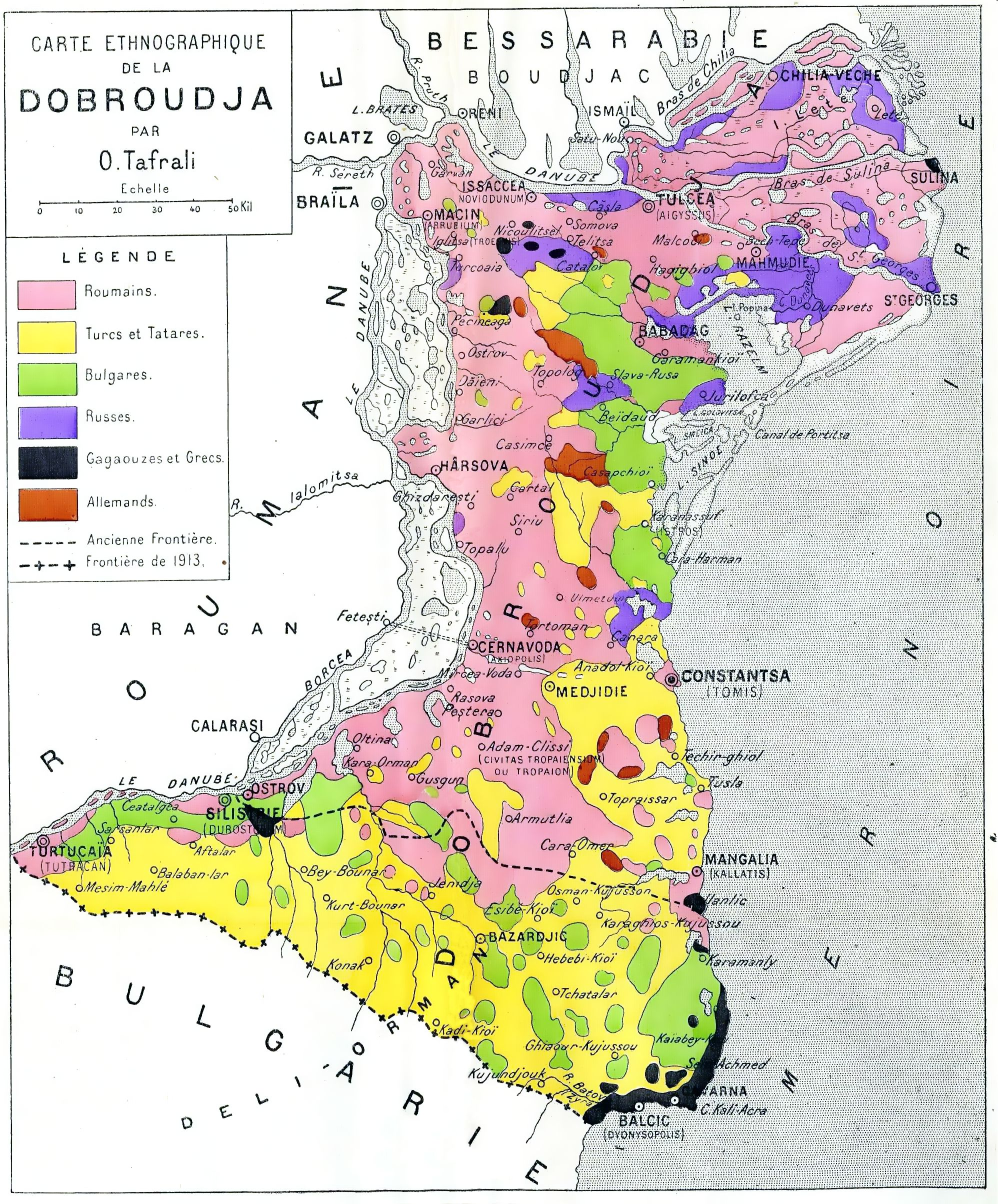
Ethnic groups in Dobruja around 1918. For the following two decades, the Romanian state would apply a policy of colonization in the southern part.

In 1940, after the transfer of Southern Dobruja to Bulgaria by Romania, the countries carried out a population exchange. It involved 103,711 Romanians, Aromanians and Megleno-Romanians living in Southern Dobruja and 62,278 Bulgarians from Northern Dobruja. After this operation, the application of a population exchange in other cases such as Transylvania was considered.

== History ==
In 1913, the Kingdom of Romania conquered Southern Dobruja after the Bulgarian defeat in the Second Balkan War. The country had already acquired Northern Dobruja in 1878. This sparked revisionist feelings in Bulgaria. Following the occupation of the Romanian regions of Bessarabia and Northern Bukovina by the Soviet Union in June 1940, Romania sought protection among the Axis powers, but it was demanded to first resolve its territorial disputes with its neighbors. Thus, on 30 August, Romania ceded Northern Transylvania to Hungary in the Second Vienna Award, while at the Treaty of Craiova of 7 September, Romania returned Southern Dobruja to Bulgaria.

Unlike Northern Transylvania, Southern Dobruja was seen as much less important by Romanian nationalists. Those ethnic Romanians who remained in Northern Transylvania were encouraged to remain there, and some nationalists promised to reconquer the region. On the other hand, in Southern Dobruja, the Romanian authorities insisted on carrying out a population exchange with Bulgaria. A total of 103,711 Romanians living in the region were transferred to Romania, while 62,278 Bulgarians native to Northern Dobruja were evacuated to Bulgaria. The Aromanian settlers, most of whom were native to Greece, were counted as Romanians and therefore left the zone as well. The same thing happened to the Megleno-Romanians from the region. These were settled in the village of Cerna, where they replaced the native Bulgarian population. The population exchange was carried out in compliance with the international laws of the time. Romania also proposed to exchange the rest of their respective minorities still residing outside Dobruja in the two countries, but Bulgaria did not approve this.

After the population exchange, in Romania, out of the 21,897 mostly peasant families that arrived, 11,678 were settled in Northern Dobruja, while the rest were settled in groups all over the country where land was available for them.

== Aftermath ==
The population exchange, perceived by some Romanian government figures of the time as a success, gave the idea more popularity in Romania. In fact, some people like Sabin Manuilă planned to carry out another one between Hungary and Romania to solve the Transylvanian dispute, but this never happened.

== See also ==
- Bulgaria–Romania relations
- Aromanians and Romanians in Bulgaria
- Bulgarians in Romania
- Population exchange between Greece and Turkey
