= Treaty of Craiova =

1940 territorial settlement between the kingdoms of Romania and Bulgaria

- Map of Southern Dobruja, ceded from Romania to Bulgaria according to the Treaty of Craiova
- Signed: 7 September 1940; 85 years ago
- Location: Craiova, Kingdom of Romania
- Signatories: Bulgaria; Romania
- Languages: French and Romanian

The Treaty of Craiova (Bulgarian: Крайовска спогодба, romanized: Krayovska spogodba; Romanian: Tratatul de la Craiova) was signed on 7 September 1940 and ratified on 13 September 1940 by the Kingdom of Bulgaria and the Kingdom of Romania. Under its terms, Romania ceded Southern Dobruja back to Bulgaria, which Romania had gained after the 1913 Second Balkan War. Bulgaria had to pay 1 million lei as compensation for the investment provided to the region by Romania.

The treaty stipulated that a population exchange between Bulgaria and Romania had to be made. Thus, 103,711 Romanians, Aromanians and Megleno-Romanians living in Southern Dobruja were forced to move to Northern Dobruja (part of Romania), and 62,278 Bulgarians located in the north were forcibly moved to the south. The Dobrujan Germans, who were affected by these relocations, would eventually be transferred to Nazi Germany.

Unlike all other territorial treaties mediated by Nazi Germany, the Treaty of Craiova was not reversed by the Allies after World War II, and Southern Dobruja remained Bulgarian.

== Background ==
Territorial losses of Romania in 1940, including Southern Dobruja

The Second Vienna Award, arbitrated by Nazi Germany and Fascist Italy, signed on 30 August 1940, assigned the territory of Northern Transylvania from Romania to Hungary. Although the devolution of Northern Transylvania had been made under the diplomatic pressure of Germany, the country did not directly intervene in the Treaty of Craiova. However, it was also implemented by the indication of Adolf Hitler, who on 31 July 1940 expressed his wish for the south of Dobruja to be returned to Bulgaria to restore the 1912 Bulgaria–Romania border.

The government of Romania received Hitler's message with surprise and expressed the wish to preserve at least the port of Balchik and the city of Silistra. The German ambassador declared that Romanian sacrifices to Bulgaria would make Hitler more sympathetic towards Romania in negotiations between Hungary and Romania on the Transylvania dispute. The Romanians attempted to keep both cities, but the Bulgarian government refused since it was aware of the German support.

Formal negotiations began on 19 August 1940 in the city of Craiova after previous contacts had been made, in which the positions of the two parties had become clear. The negotiations were not easy, and it was only in the face of the threat of Italian–German arbitration during the Hungarian-Romanian negotiations on 29 August when Romania was trying to achieve the benevolence of the Axis powers, that the Romanian delegation announced its readiness to cede all of Southern Dobruja. The Romanians also attempted to delay the talks while they tried to persuade the Germans to maintain the territorial integrity of Romania.

== Terms ==
Ethnic and religious makeup of Southern Dobruja as of 1930

The Treaty of Craiova finally crystallized in a return to the 1912 borders. The southern part of the Dobruja, which had been conquered by Romania during the Second Balkan War, was returned to Bulgaria and assumed by Romania the loss of a territory with an area of 7,142 km^{2} (2,758 sq mi) and a population of which ethnic Romanians made up 25% or 28.4% (depending on the source). The agreement was signed on 7 September 1940 by Alexandru Cretzianu and Henri-Georges Meitani, representing King Michael I of Romania, and Svetoslav Pomenov and Teokhar Papazoff, representing Tsar Boris III of Bulgaria. The treaty was ratified on the Romanian side on 13 September by Prime Minister and Conducător Ion Antonescu, but not by King Michael I.

The loss of Southern Dobruja did not cause an uproar in Romania, unlike the transfer of Northern Transylvania to Hungary in the almost-simultaneous Second Vienna Award, since Northern Transylvania was more important in the nationalist ideal, with the Romanian government successively insisting on recovering it. The surrender of the Cadrilater ("Quadrilateral", another name for Southern Dobruja) was interpreted by the Romanian political class as "a mutilation of the country" forced by the pressures of the Axis, and by the authorities in Bulgaria as the "correction of an injustice".

On the insistence of Romania, the treaty involved a population exchange. The 103,711 Romanians who lived in the area were forced to leave their homes and move to Northern Dobruja, and the 62,278 Bulgarians residing in the northern part were forced to move to the south. Most of those Romanians were settlers who had emigrated to Southern Dobruja after the 1913 Treaty of Bucharest, which had assigned the region to Romania. The Aromanian settlers, most of whom were native to Greece, were counted as Romanians and also left the zone. The case of the Megleno-Romanian settlers was not different; they were deported from Southern Dobruja and settled in the village of Cerna within Romanian borders.

Bulgaria had to compensate the displaced Romanians for their losses of equity and pay Romania 1 million lei for investments made in the region. Although the bilateral treaty involved the forced displacement of hundreds of thousands of people, it was carried out peacefully and in accordance with the international laws at the time: this contrasted sharply with Romania's concessions to the Soviet Union and to Hungary at this time, as both of those events saw considerable violence. Romania additionally proposed to exchange all members of the respective ethnic minorities residing in the rest of the two countries, but this was rejected by Bulgaria.

The forced relocations also affected the Dobrujan Germans, most of whom lived in Northern Dobruja, under Romanian rule, although some of them also lived in the Bulgarian southern part. They were ultimately transferred to Nazi Germany through the Heim ins Reich ("back home to the Reich") policy.

== See also ==
- Bulgarians in Romania
- Molotov–Ribbentrop Pact
- Romanians in Bulgaria
- Soviet occupation of Bessarabia and Northern Bukovina
