= Southern Dobruja =

Geographical region in north-eastern Bulgaria

Southern Dobruja Южна Добруджа/Добруджа (Bulgarian) Dobrogea de Sud/Dobrogea Nouă (Romanian)
- Historical region of Southeastern Europe
- 1913–1940
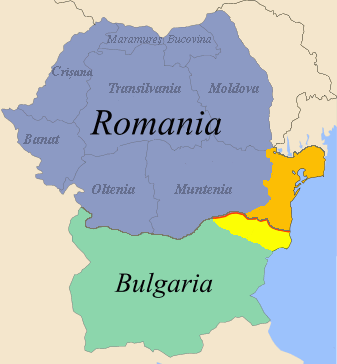
- Map of Bulgaria and Romania with Southern Dobruja or Cadrilater highlighted in yellow. Northern Dobruja is highlighted in orange.
- Area
  - 1913: 7,412 km^{2} (2,862 sq mi)
  - 1940: 7,412 km^{2} (2,862 sq mi)
- Population
  - 1913: 286,000
  - 1940: 400,000 (before population exchange)
- History
  - Treaty of Bucharest: 10 August 1913
  - Treaty of Craiova: 7 September 1940
- Political subdivisions: Provinces: Dobrich Province; Silistra Province
Preceded by	Succeeded by
Kingdom of Romania	Kingdom of Bulgaria
- Today part of: Bulgaria

Southern Dobruja or South Dobruja (Bulgarian: Южна Добруджа, romanized: Yuzhna Dobrudzha or simply Добруджа, Dobrudzha; Romanian: Dobrogea de Sud or Dobrogea Nouă, lit. 'New Dobruja'), also the Quadrilateral (Romanian: Cadrilater), is an area of north-eastern Bulgaria comprising Dobrich and Silistra provinces, part of the historical region of Dobruja. It has an area of 7,412 square km and a population of 358,000.

It is historically noteworthy as a point of contention in Bulgarian-Romanian relations. Part of Bulgaria between 1878 and 1913, the region was annexed by Romania in the Treaty of Bucharest (1913), targeted by Bulgaria during World War I (1914–18), and subsequently remained Romanian until 1940, when Bulgaria regained control in the Treaty of Craiova, which went along with a compulsory population exchange. Southern Dobruja has been part of Bulgaria since 1940.

== History ==
At the beginning of the modern era, Southern Dobruja had a mixed population of Bulgarians and Turks with several smaller minorities, including Gagauz, Crimean Tatars and Romanians. In 1910, of the 282,007 inhabitants of Southern Dobruja, 134,355 (47.6%) were Bulgarians, 106,568 (37.8%) Turks, 12,192 (4.3%) Roma, 11,718 (4.1%) Tatars, and 6,484 (2.4%) Romanians.

Southern Dobruja was part of the autonomous Bulgarian principality from 1878 and part of the independent Bulgarian state from 1908 until Bulgaria's defeat in the Second Balkan War, when the region was ceded to Romania under the Treaty of Bucharest (1913).

In 1914, Romania demanded all landowners prove their property and surrender to the Romanian state one third of the land they claimed or pay an equivalent of its value. This was similar to the agrarian reforms in Romania which occurred the previous century, in which the landlords had to give up two-thirds of their land, which was then handed over to the peasants. In Southern Dobruja, many of the peasants who received the land were settlers, including tens of thousands of Aromanians from Macedonia, as well as Megleno-Romanians from the same place and Romanians from Wallachia, which led to claims that the reforms had a nationalist purpose.

On 7 September 1940, Southern Dobruja was restored to Bulgaria under the Treaty of Craiova. The treaty was followed by a mandatory population exchange: about 110,000 Romanians (almost 95% of whom settled there after 1913), Aromanians and Megleno-Romanians were forced to leave Southern Dobruja, whereas 77,000 Bulgarians had to leave Northern Dobruja. Only a few hundred Romanians and Aromanians are now left in the region.

== Demographic history ==
Ethnicity	1910^{1}	1930^{2}	2001	2011
All	282,007	378,344	357,217	283,395^{4}
Bulgarian	134,355 (47.6%)	143,209 (37.9%)	248,382 (69.5%)	192,698 (68%)
Turkish	106,568 (37.8%)	129,025 (34.1%)	76,992 (21.6%)	72,963 (25.75%)
Roma	12,192 (4.3%)	7,615 (2%)	25,127 (7%)	12,163 (4.29%)
Tatar	11,718 (4.2%)	6,546 (1.7%)	4,515 (1.3%)	808 (0.29%)
Romanian	6,348 (2.3%)^{3}	77,728 (20.5%)	591 (0.2%)^{3}	947 (0.33%)
^{1}Slightly lower figures for ethnic Bulgarians, but the same (2.33%) for the number of Romanians according to Popescu.^{2}According to the 1926–1938 Romanian administrative division (counties of Durostor and Caliacra), which included a part of today's Romania (chiefly the communes of Ostrov and Lipnița, now part of Constanța County) and excluded a part of today's Bulgaria (parts of General Toshevo and Krushari municipalities).^{3}Including persons counted as Vlachs in Bulgarian Census^{4}Only includes persons who answered the optional question on ethnic identity. The total population was 309,151.

== Administrative divisions ==
Between 1913 and 1940, during the Romanian rule, the region covered two counties: Durostor and Caliacra. Nowadays, the territory of Southern Dobruja forms the provinces of Silistra and Dobrich.

== See also ==
- Northern Dobruja
- Balchik Palace, summer palace residence of Queen Marie of Romania
