= Monument to Dante =

Statue of Dante Alighieri in Florence, Italy

- Monumento a Dante Alighieri
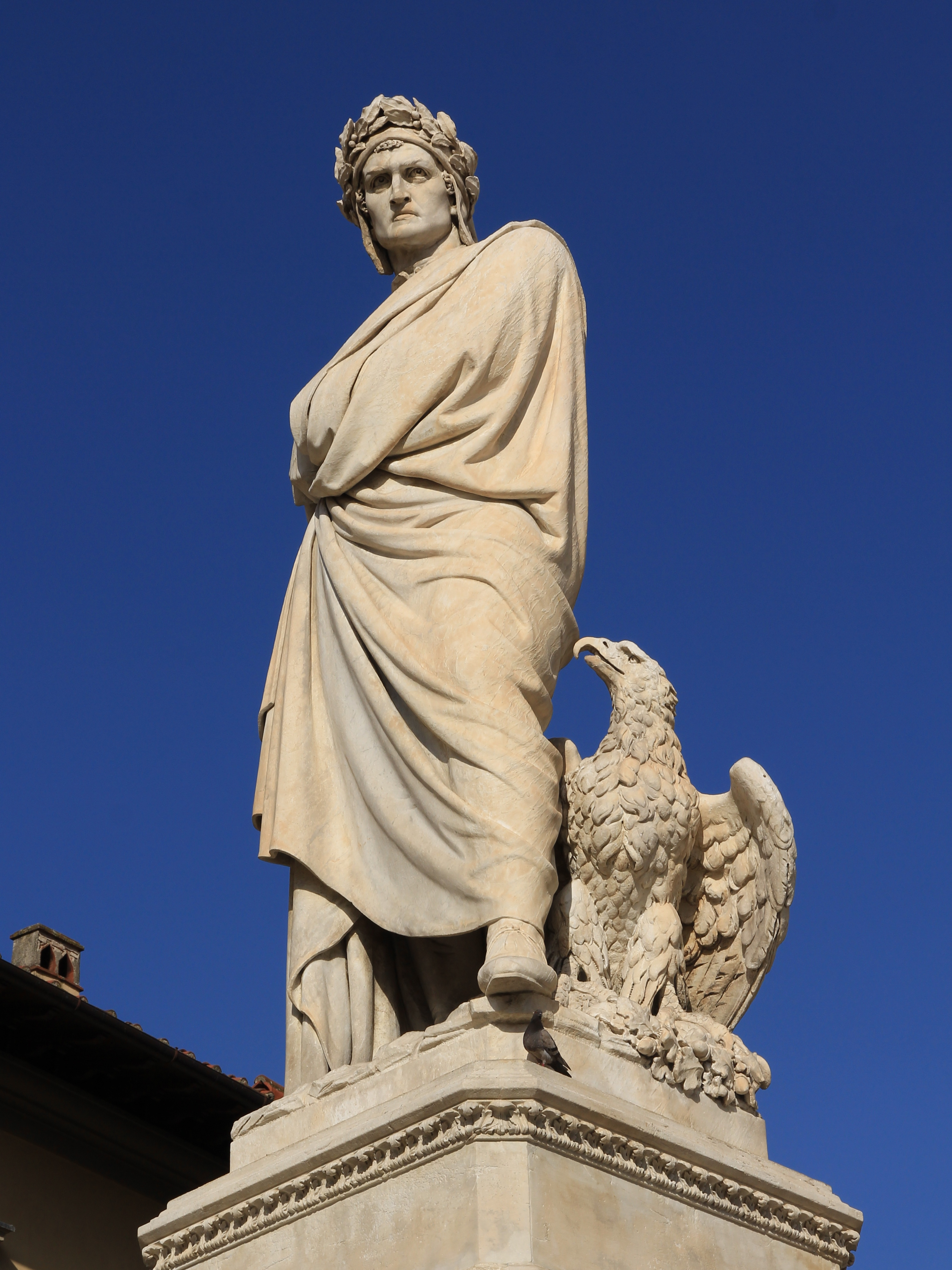
- Statue of Dante Alighieri
- Interactive map of Monument to Dante
- Location: Piazza Santa Croce, Florence, Italy
- Coordinates: 43°46′08″N 11°15′44″E
- Designer: Enrico Pazzi
- Type: Memorial
- Completion date: 1865
- Dedicated to: Dante Alighieri

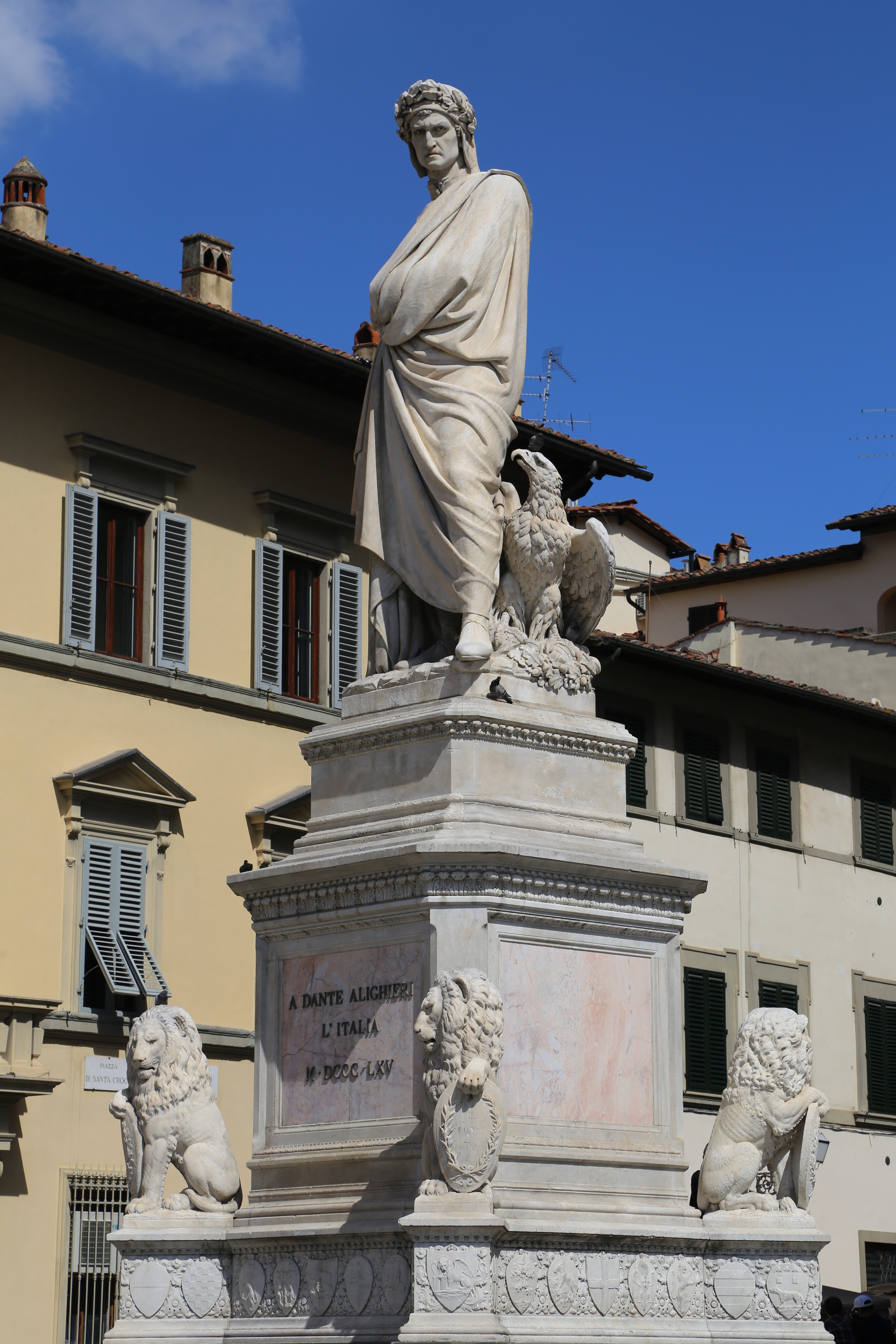
Statue of Dante

The Statue of Dante Alighieri (Italian: Monumento a Dante Alighieri) is a monument to Dante Alighieri in Piazza Santa Croce, outside the Basilica of Santa Croce, in Florence, Italy. Erected in 1865, it is the work of the sculptor Enrico Pazzi.

== History ==
In the early 1850s, a project for a statue of Dante in a piazza in Ravenna was declined. Pazzi subsisted on small private projects for tomb monuments and house decorations. He completed for Giovanni Dupré a commission for a nativity scene, destined for the Signora Bianchi of Siena; however, he had difficulty in getting paid.

In 1857–1859, a move was made to complete the Dante statue, but now for Florence. The patriotic Pazzi recalls an unfortunate episode when Prince Leopold, Count of Syracuse (brother of the King of Naples) visited the studio accompanied by the interior minister of Leopold II, Grand Duke of Tuscany. The visiting Prince inquired why Dante was surrounded by beasts. Pazzi indicated that the lions were the Marzocchi, long a symbol of Medici Florence. However, when asked why the eagle did not have a double head, the symbol of the Habsburg dynasty, Pazzi impertinently replied that this was a Roman eagle, arising from the ashes of the fallen Roman Empire. With this, the retinue left. It would be nearly half a decade before Pazzi's statue was erected in the piazza.

The statue was erected in 1865 to celebrate the 600th anniversary of Dante's birth. The pedestal was designed by Luigi del Sarto. The creation of a statue of a famous Florentine by a sculptor from Ravenna caused some rumblings. Florence and Ravenna had for years disputed who was to hold the remains of Dante: his native city or the city of his exile. The church of Santa Croce, which stands on the same piazza as this statue, has an elaborate but empty tomb monument to the poet.

The pedestal has four Marzocco lions with shields holding the names of minor works by Dante and the symbols of various Italian cities who contributed to the cost of the sculpture.

The statue, initially placed in the center of the Piazza, was moved after the flood of November 1966 to a position in front of the flank of the façade of the basilica.

== See also ==
- Prince Mihailo Monument
- Monument to Savonarola
