= Studentski Trg =

Studentski Trg Студентски Трг
- Urban neighbourhood
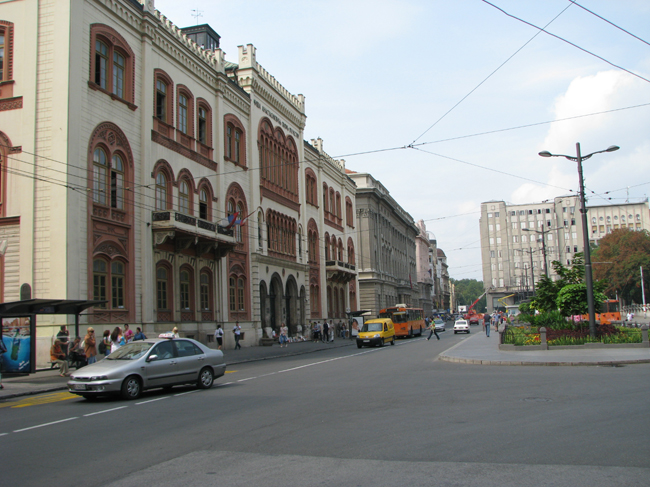
- University of Belgrade's rectorate building is located at Studentski Trg.

- Location within Belgrade
- Coordinates: 44.818918°N 20.457442°E
- Country: Serbia
- Region: Belgrade
- Municipality: Stari Grad
- Time zone: UTC+1 (CET)
  - Summer (DST): UTC+2 (CEST)
- Area code: +381(0)11
- Car plates: BG

Studentski Trg (Serbian Cyrillic: Студентски Трг), or Students Square, is one of the central town squares and an urban neighborhood of Belgrade, the capital of Serbia. It is located in Belgrade's municipality of Stari Grad. In the Classical Antiquity, area of the modern square was the center of Singidunum, Roman precursor of modern Belgrade.

== Location ==
Studentski Trg is located halfway between the Republic Square (to the east) and the Kalemegdan park-fortress (to the west). It is adjacent to the Academy Park. To the north it extends into the neighborhood of (Upper) Dorćol, while the pedestrian zone of Knez Mihailova is located to the south.

== History ==
=== Roman period ===
Predecessor of Belgrade was Singidunum, Celtic and, later, Roman fortified town. The original earthen and wooden fort stretched around the Studentski Trg and Knez Mihailova Street. The oldest Roman graves were discovered in this section, dated to the 1st and early 2nd century. The central axis of the city grid was in the modern Uzun Mirkova-Studentski Trg-Vasina-Republic Square direction, thus the area od modern square was the "heart" of ancient Singidunum. Part of the main axis was an additional turning at modern Rajićeva Street. There was a gate at the entrance into the military camp. The gate was located where the City Library, the last building in the Knez Mihailova Street before the Kalemegdan Park, is located today.

Northern section of the Academy Park was excavated in 1968 in the project of building a furnace oil tank for the boiler room of the Belgrade's City Committee of the League of Communists located nearby. Under the lawn, the remnants of the ancient Roman thermae were discovered, including the frigidarium (room with the cold water), laconicum (room with the warm water), caldarium (room with the two pools of hot water) and tepidarium (room where people would sweat and prepare). The site became an archaeological dig in 1969 and 8 rooms in total were discovered, including the remains of the brick furnace which heated the water. Despite the military character of Singidunum, it was a public unisex bath. It is dated to 3rd or 4th century. Almost the entire building was unearthed, covering 150 m^{2} (1,600 sq ft) with walls being preserved up to the height of 140 m (460 ft).

The building had the system of floor and wall heating, made of special, hollow bricks which allowed for the hot air to circulate through the rooms (tegula mammata and tubula). The canals which conducted the water to the thermae, and were discovered in 2013 when the manhole was dug in front of the Ethnographic Museum. The canals were connected to the main aqueduct built by the Romans, which conducted water from the springs in modern Mali Mokri Lug. The thermae was built by the Roman military, as attested by the inscriptions on the bricks which contain markings of the Legio IV Flavia Felix. The entire area of the park is actually within the borders of the "Protected zone of Roman Singidunum". It is situated in the area that used to be the civilian sector of the city, outside the fortress. The remnants were visible until 1978 and due to the lack of funds to continue excavations or to cover it with the roof or a marquee, the remains were conserved and buried again. There are remains of another thermae, at the nearby Faculty of Philosophy Plateau. They are still visible and are used as benches.

In general, the entire surrounding area is rich in Roman remains from the 1st to the 3rd century AD. They also include remains below modern Faculty of Philosophy, hotel Square 9 (locality Studentsi trg 9) and Ethnographic Museum (canals in front of the entrance in the museum). Below the roundabout are extremely well preserved 1-metre-tall (3 ft) walls, surrounded by the intact Roman floors and barriers. This section was discovered in 1989, but wasn't archaeologically surveyed.

Some of the oldest remains are those discovered under the faculty building. They are dated to c.100 and were still made of wattle and lep, a wall plaster made of mud. Apart from the thermae, there are also remains of a large building, with three apses and floor heating system.

=== Ottoman period ===
During the Ottoman period, the area was occupied by the Turkish cemetery, mezarlık. The cemetery stretched to the modern streets of Knez Mihailova and Zmaj Jovina. Numerous remains from this period were discovered since the 1950s, during the various communal works conducted on the square and the surrounding areas.

=== Great Market ===
At the place of the modern square, there was an open green marketplace for over a century. At the beginning of the 19th century, farmers were selling goods at the entrances to the city. However, Turkish soldiers would often forcibly buy goods from them at the small prices, and then sell it themselves in the city for much higher amounts. After constant complaints from the farmers, vizier of Belgrade, after counseling with the city merchants, agreed to choose one place for the market: da se učini u Beogradu jedno pazarište ili Toržište ("a bazar or a marketplace is to be founded in Belgrade").

Also, in 1821, the state government decided to put the food trade in order and to establish the quantity and quality of the goods imported to the city. Part of the project was introduction of the excise on the goods (in Serbian called trošarina) and setting of a series of excise check points on the roads leading to the city. That same year, the city's first proper greenmarket became operational. Originally, it opened in 1824 right across the Belgrade Fortress, in the modern Pariska street, stretching between the Uzun Mirkova and Knez Mihailova streets, where the City Library is today. Only 4 days later, it was moved to the location above the old, defunct Turkish cemetery. The chosen location was situated above the Tekija building and the Kizlar Aga's Mosque, close to the starting section of the Tsarigrad Road. The market was soon equipped with market stalls for selling fruits and vegetables and barracks for the dairy products, eggs and dried meat. Raw meat was not allowed at the market. Poultry was sold alive and only in pairs. Other meat was prepared and sold in butcher shops and, since there were no refrigerators, had to be sold by noon. Apart from being the first arranged and planned market in the city, it also was the first to have a sanitary inspection which checked the hygiene, quality and freshness of the goods.

As per Serbian-Turkish agreement anyone could bring and sell goods, the market quickly grew and became city's commercial center. Though it was officially named "Saint Andrew's Market" it became known as the Great Market (Serbian: Velika pijaca or Veliki pijac).

=== Formation of the square ===
The square developed around the market, also occupying parts of the former Turkish graveyard. It was originally called Veliki trg ("Great Square"). As the ceremony of proclamation of Serbia into the kingdom in 1882 was held here, the square was renamed to Kraljev trg ("King's Square"). In 1863 the Captain Miša's Mansion was built and the Great School moved in. In the direction of Kalemegdan, municipal administration of Belgrade was located and the building was later used for the municipal court. Later city administration building was also located here, just on the northern side. At the corner with the Zmaja od Noćaja Street, the fire brigade was situated. They used the lookout on the top of the Captain Miša's Mansion to inspect the city. As the city had no tall buildings at the time, the guard from the lookout was able to pinpoint a specific house anywhere in the city if the fire broke out. He would then alarm his colleagues below using a trumpet. In the kafana Kod Rajića junaka serbskog, prince Mihailo Obrenović organized festivities after he was handed over the keys to the city from the Ottomans, who had to evacuate the Belgrade Fortress.

Prince Mihailo was assassinated on 10 June 1868. The Board for the erection of the monument was formed already on 14 June 1868 and decided to collect donations for the construction of both the church in Košutnjak, at the assassination location, and a monumental sculpture in the city itself. Russian sculptor Mikhail Mikeshin, after arriving in Belgrade in October 1868, and inspecting the city, in cooperation with the government and the Board, proposed two designs for the monument to the prince, which was to be erected at the Great Market. After the public display, the citizens apparently liked the designs and approved the building. However, the process of building the memorial dragged on, and in 1871 Mikeshin's propositions were rejected. Also in 1871, the government opted to build only the monument in the city. It announced the international design competition but dissatisfied with the results, the government repeated the competition in 1873. This time, the location for the monument was set at the Theatre Square (modern Republic Square), across the National Theatre in Belgrade, which was built by prince Michael. Its were the Prince Mihailo Monument was ultimately built in 1882.

In one of the houses at the future square, the Red Cross of Serbia was founded on 6 February 1876. During the Serbian-Ottoman wars from 1876 to 1878, Mikhail Chernyayev headed a corps of Russian volunteers to Belgrade. A mobile military church dedicated to the Holly Prince Alexander Nevsky also came from Russia and followed them to the battlefields. It was located at the Great Market in 1876, and was used for eucharists and requiem masses. When the church was permanently moved in 1876, residents of Dorćol formed a board for the construction of the church and a small, stone church was built further down the hill and a bit below the modern one, dedicated to Alexander Nevsky, too. In turn, it was demolished in 1891 and modern Church if the Holy Alexander Nevsky was finished by 1930.

First modern Belgrade's urbanist Emilijan Josimović suggested dislocation of the market in 1887, as it was placed in the sole center of the city. Plus, he deemed it inappropriate for the Great School to be across the market. But when the horse-drawn tram was introduced in Belgrade 1892, and it passed through this part of the city, the market actually bloomed even more. Josimović met with much resistance and only some time before his death, he managed for the city to decide to split the market in two and to form a park in one of the sections. The open space area around the market, which was now a defunct Turkish cemetery, and the northwestern section were turned into the park, as Josimović originally envisioned. He also proposed for the nearby buffer zone between the city and the Fortress to be adapted into the Kalemegdan Park, as he considered parks the "air reservoirs". The park was opened on 11 May 1897, just two weeks before Josimović's death. On the same day, the monument to Josif Pančić, work of sculptor Đorđe Jovanović was erected in the park. As the monument was covered with cloth for a long time, citizens colloquially nicknamed the square a "plateau of the bagged man".

The market itself continued to operate until 1926 when was finally closed. With the closing of the Great Market, city government built several other markets in the city, bit further from the downtown: Zeleni Venac, Kalenić market, Bajloni market and Jovanova market. The park that was created was named Pančićev Park, after his monument in the park, and is today known as the Akademski Park. Pančić's monument was coupled with the monument dedicated to Dositej Obradović in 1914, which was transferred to the Akadameski park in the early 1930s from his previous location at the end of the Knez Mihailova street. The square was finally formed in its present shape by 1927, with the park in the central part. Park was planned by architect Đorđe Kovaljski while the recognizable enclosure and the gates were added in 1929, on the project of Milutin Borisavljević.

== Characteristics ==
Studentski Trg was projected as the first in a succession of squares around Belgrade's central route from Kalemegdan to Slavija: Studentski Trg-Trg Republike-Terazije-Cvetni Trg-Slavija.

In time, Studentski Trg and Terazije pretty much lost their square functions, becoming streets, while Cvetni Trg, with final changes in the early 2000s, is completely defunct as a traffic object. Studentski Trg is turned into the turning point and terminal station for bus line number 31 and majority of Belgrade's trolleybus lines (19, 21, 22, 22L, 28, 29 and 41). Trolleybuses were transferred to the square from the terminal in the nearby Rajićeva Street in 2003. Dorćol, below the square, hosts the central depot for city trolleybuses, in the Dunavska Street. After the new city government took over in 2013, an idea of abolishing the trolleybus network was raised, due to the possible creation of the pedestrian zone in the entire central section of Belgrade. Propositions include the change of the routes in downtown, the relocation of the central terminus from Studentski Trg to Slavija Square and of the depo from Dorćol to Medaković. After public protests, the idea was modified in 2015 and the city announced that the terminus from Studentski Trg will be relocated to the Dunavska Street, extending the trolleybus lines to Dorćol, as a temporary solution. As of July 2022 nothing has been done regarding the trolleybuses relocation. The central area of the turning point, which contains some greenery, covers 0.14 hectares (0.35 acres).

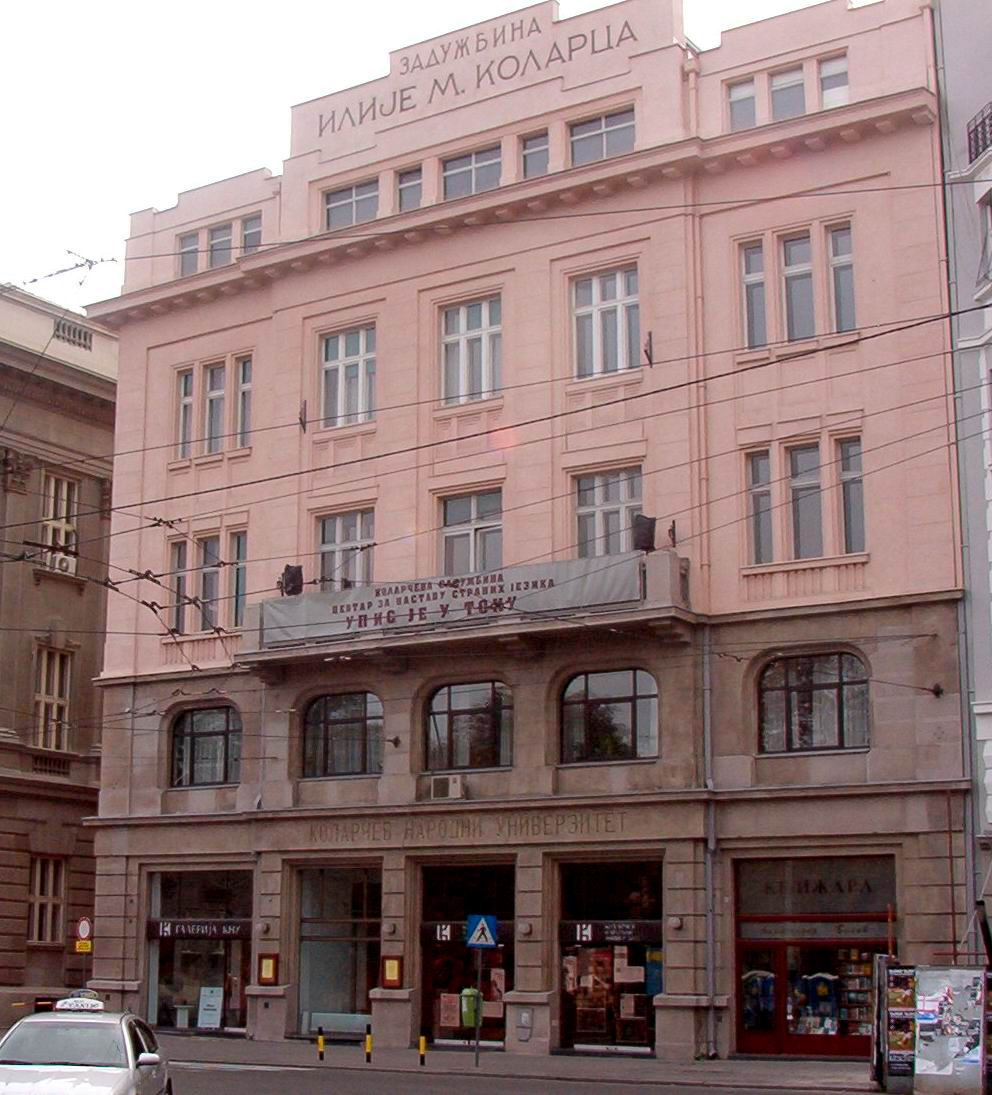
Kolarac University

Studentski Trg is location of many educational and cultural institutions, thus the names (Students Square, Academy Park, etc.). They include:

- Rectorate of the University of Belgrade in the representative Captain Miša's Mansion;
- Faculty for Natural Sciences and Mathematics (University of Belgrade);
- University of Belgrade Faculty of Philosophy;
- University of Belgrade Faculty of Philology;
- Kolarac Public University, with concert hall, ceremonially opened on 4 February 1932; though smaller, due to its famous acoustics the venue has been dubbed the Serbian Carnegie Hall.
- Ethnographic museum;
- A monument to Petar II Petrović Njegoš on the Faculty of Philosophy Plateau;
- A monument to Karl Malden, in front of the Yugoslav Film Archive, dedicated in November 2018;

=== Glavnjača ===
On the northern, Dorćol side, a building was constructed in 1864 which served as the seat of the Belgrade city administration. But it was also a seat of the city police and the cellar of the building was divided into several rooms which served as the prison cells. The convicts in time named the cells according to their use: Ćorka, the smallest one which had no windows (Serbian: ćorav, "blind"); "Female salon", the female cell; "Gentlemen's room", the cell for the distinguished citizens; Glavnjača, the main and the largest cell (Serbian: glavno, "main"). In time, word ćorka became a usual Serbian slang for prison in general, while by the early 20th century Glavnjača was colloquially adopted as the name for the entire building.

From the start, both the criminals and the political prisoners were jailed, but after 1921 when the Communist party was forbidden by the state, the jail became packed with the political prisoners, separatists and nationalists. Glavnjača gained a notoriety because of the bad conditions, regular torture of the prisoners and for being overcrowded. The cell, which was projected for 60 to 70 people usually had up to 350 people crammed inside. Only in 1921, 15,000 people were incarcerated in Glavnjača.

During the 1944 liberation of Belgrade, the building was burned to the ground. The remains were completely demolished in 1953 and the massive building of the Natural Sciences and Mathematics Faculty was built on its location later. In 1974, a memorial was placed in front of the faculty building, celebrating 30 years of the liberation. Work of Milorad Tepavac, it consists of a mosaic with the inscriptions, a slab of marble on it and the bronze flower on the slab.

=== Faculty of Philosophy Plateau ===
In the 19th century, before hotels in Belgrade were founded, numerous khans existed in the city. Oriental variant of the roadside inn, they provided travelers with food, drink and resting facilities. One of the largest in Belgrade at the time was the Turkish Khan (Turski han), located where the modern plateau is.

In 1964 the request for tender for the new building of the Faculty of Philosophy on the location of the former hotel "Grand" was announced. As the several surrounding small houses were also demolished, one of the propositions was the wide space between the new faculty building and the Captain Miša's Mansion. Svetislav Ličina, only 34 at the time, won, despite many distinguished architects took part in the tendering. The work was finished in 1974. Ličina projected an elevated four-storeys connection between the new and the old building, leaving a wide open connection between the Studentski Trg and Knez Mihailova Street. That way, the small square, piazzetta, formed by the streets of Knez Mihailova and Čika Ljubina, with the drinking fountain, continued into the newly formed plateau on Studentski Trg. The plateau is also known as the Academy Plateau. It covers an area of 2,139 m^{2} (23,020 sq ft).

Since the early 1900s there were ideas of erecting a monument to Petar II Petrović Njegoš. During the Interbellum several boards for erection of the monument were formed, which included some of the culture's most prominent people like Branislav Nušić or Ivo Andrić, and the Royal Karađorđević dynasty even donated money, but due to the disagreements of the convenient location, the monument wasn't built. After World War II, the task of carving the monument was given to Sreten Stojanović who finished it in 1952 and garnered numerous praises. Serbian government decided to place it on Cvetni Trg, across the Yugoslav Drama Theater, but the city government, supported by the public stalled the process as on this location, the monument to such an important person would be placed next to the public toilet. During this delay, Montenegrin government reacted and placed the monument in Titograd. On 22 June 1989 city assembly decided to place the replica of Stojanović's work in Belgrade. The 800 kg (1,800 lb) heavy duplicate was cast in the "Plastika" foundry in Dorćol. Within the plateau, architect Branko Bojović arranged the surrounding area of the monument which was officially dedicated on 29 June 1994 by novelist Milorad Pavić.

Below the plateau is the depot of the Faculty of Philosophy's Department of Psychology. The depot contains some 60 instruments which were used by Wilhelm Wundt in his laboratory for psychological research at Leipzig University. Wundt's work in this famed laboratory, founded in 1879, helped to develop psychology as an independent field of study. Most of the instruments were constructed specifically for Wundt by Emil Zimmermann and Belgrade collection makes a majority of Wundt's instruments. They arrived in Serbia after World War I as part of the German war reparations. The instruments were placed at their present location in 1974 and were placed under state care and protection in the 1990s.

Due to the years of poor maintenance, the plateau tiles deteriorated, and it became devastated by 2020. The faculty urged the city to renovate it, but city administration refused, with deputy mayor Goran Vesić claiming the faculty owns the area and it should fix it. This was disputed by the faculty and former city officials, reminding that Vesić himself announced reconstruction in 2018. The faculty is the user, not the owner, of the part which is under the building, while the devastated area is public, pedestrian square of which the city has jurisdiction anyway, just as it maintained it in previous decades. Vesić said that he would commit crime if the city would renovate the plateau. He also responded that if professors already know everything and know how to criticize the government, then they should fix the tiles, too, and sent city inspection which ordered the faculty to "return the plateau into the previous condition". The faculty refused, also due to the fact that the area is under several layers of legal protection and can't be simply patched.

== Future ==
In July 2016 city administration announced the complete reconstruction of Studentski Trg and its adaptation into the pedestrian zone, construction of the underground garage and erection of a monument to the assassinated prime minister Zoran Đinđić. The project of the reconstruction was designed by Boris Podrecca, but it was met with almost universal criticism from the architects, urbanists and public alike.

Architects opposed the general redesign of the square which appears to be planned with the absolute liberty, as if there aren't any cultural, architectural, archaeological or legal limitations due to the protection of the area and that, as such, damages and violates the cultural-monumental protection of the square. Creation of one single, large pedestrian zone from the Republic Square to Kalemegdan and the ban of the traffic was deemed "not realistic". The project was labeled as the pompous, undeveloped designing intervention based solely on the aesthetic principle and the superficial interpretation of projects seen elsewhere. Other descriptions include the total lack of cultural arguments, lack of ideas, spirit, style and other things which marks the culture and identity of Belgrade.

Part of the criticism concerns the public and professional debate on the project, that is, almost complete lack of it. The process of the architectural design competition has been described as "we draw the project, without previous thorough analysis and propositions, we win the award and the realization begins!", and the entire project was deemed as "major incompetence". Process was to be reversed: a team of local intellectuals, artists and professionals, well familiar with history, culture and spirit of the locality was to be summoned, and then their conclusions should be handed over to the architects to frame everything. This way, the result is a "modern design without any program idea", a "vain solution witch speaks nothing, except for the present vogue of the design beauty".

Podrecca was directly criticized for some of his previous problematic projects (Maribor, Trieste, etc.) and his construction of the lifeless and soulless squares. Decision on the removal of the traffic was brought without any proper idea what to do with it and where to conduct it, in the manner of "sweeping it under the rug". The removal of traffic from this section of the city needs a systematic solution on a much wider city area but the city government didn't provide any. Apparently, by the propositions, author of the project had no obligation to take care of the traffic, so he didn't. The position of Podrecca to decide what will be turned into the pedestrian zone instead of just projecting the square, and the city's decision to close for the traffic streets in downtown has been disputed.

Construction of the two-level underground garage is also criticized. As if there is no archaeological locality beneath the park, while the protruding Roman elements, visible on the Faculty of Philosophy Plateau, remain isolated. Handling of these two localities is described as the typical indifference towards the archaeological remains and lack of concern for the cultural heritage. Area of the modern square is the first among the most important urban zones of old Belgrade and is especially important as the locality of ancient Singidunum which developed along the Terazije ridge. The locality has not been properly explored, historically or archaeologically, and now all the Roman and later Byzantine remains will be permanently destroyed. The area of the square was described as having the deepest "cultural and historical sedimentation" in the city and the original source of the urban culture of Belgrade.

It was pointed out that Studentski Trg is one of such ambient spaces which is defined by the elements important for the collective memory. aesthetic, spiritual or emotional experience of the majority of the citizens. That way, such spaces, especially in large cities, have public importance and with preserving the deeper historical layers in time achieve a status of specific historical, social or cultural identity and character. Despite all the criticism, deputy mayor Goran Vesić announced in September 2018 that the construction will start "in the fall". In April 2019, Archaeological Institute in Belgrade stated that they have been notifying city administration about the problems with the project and the way the remains should be preserved since December 2014, but that they never received any reply.

In July 2019, city urbanist Marko Stojčić said that if the "central part of Singidunum is to be discovered", there will be no underground garage, which would then be moved to the Republic Square. In February 2020 Stojčić said that "public procurement for the geological excavations" is on the way, that 3 to 5 survey pits will be dug and if there are remains of Singidunum below, the garage project will be terminated. Instead, pedestrian underground corridor, 2.5 m (8 ft 2 in) deep, will be built so that remains will be accessible to visitors. Despite claiming that Podrecca's project will be preserved, with abandoning the garage, introducing the tram tracks and dislocating proposed Đinđić's monument, the project will be significantly changed.

=== Monument to Zoran Đinđić ===
The look of the future monument to the assassinated prime minister was announced on 21 October 2017. A modernist installation, work of sculptor Mrđan Bajić and dramatist Biljana Srbljanović, represents a "bent arrow, broken in the middle, but then continued to unstoppably fly to the skies". The arrow will be accompanied by the sound installations, with the recorded voice of Đinđić. The overwhelmingly negative reaction from the public and professionals resulted in a heated debate, which tackled not only architectural, cultural and visual sides of the project, but also the morality of the idea.

Location of the Đinđić monument, across the Njegoš monument, has been labeled as the politically opportune, while the monument itself is described as "appearing poor and unsustainable." The design competition was said to be a "missed opportunity" and the direction of the arrow as wrong, as it directs the pedestrians to the sky, instead to Europe, where Đinđić was leading Serbia. The installation was depicted as inferior compared to the classical Prince Mihailo Monument on the Republic Square and denied its symbolism as "Đinđić himself, as a personality, was a symbol of the future". It was suggested that probably the better place for such installation would be the vicinity of the Building of the General Staff, demolished in 1999 NATO bombing of Serbia. Author and artist Mileta Prodanović, on the other hand, liked the proposition. Opposing voices also mentioned a fact that a monument, which represents a person or an event, in order to remain in the permanent memory, must associate on that person or an event. That passers-by and tourists can't have with them dictionary of symbols all the time. Also, was it a competition for a monument or an installation, in which case the jury missed the point.

Association of the Serbian Architects (ASA) asked for the competition to be annulled, citing procedural reasons. They claim the jury digressed from the basic propositions. It includes the anonymity as Bajić directly collaborates with two jury members (Vladimir Veličković and Dušan Otašević), while he circled his cipher on the presented work, by which, they allege, he indicated to the jury that it was his work. The ASA also accused Podrecca of the conflict of interest. As a "financially interested party", being the author of the square reconstruction, he shouldn't serve as the jury president.

At the time, city government planned to place the monument on 12 March 2018, on the 15th anniversary of Đinđić's assassination. As it was planned to be placed at the central part of the present carriageway, the project of transforming the square into the pedestrian zone had to be done first. However, the authorities went quiet on this project, additionally introducing the idea of a tram line across the chosen location. In February 2020, city announced that the monument will be "dislocated" from its planned position. In May 2022 it was announced that the monument has been finished "a long time ago" in Novi Sad, and that it will be dedicated on 12 March 2023, marking the 20th anniversary of Đinđić's assassination. The monument is 6 metres (20 ft) tall, made of inox, while the bars which keep it upward are made of corten steel. This was later changed to "expectations" that the monument will be placed by the end of 2023.
