= Palazzo Cocchi-Serristori =

Coordinates: 43°46′9.38″N 11°15′38.37″E

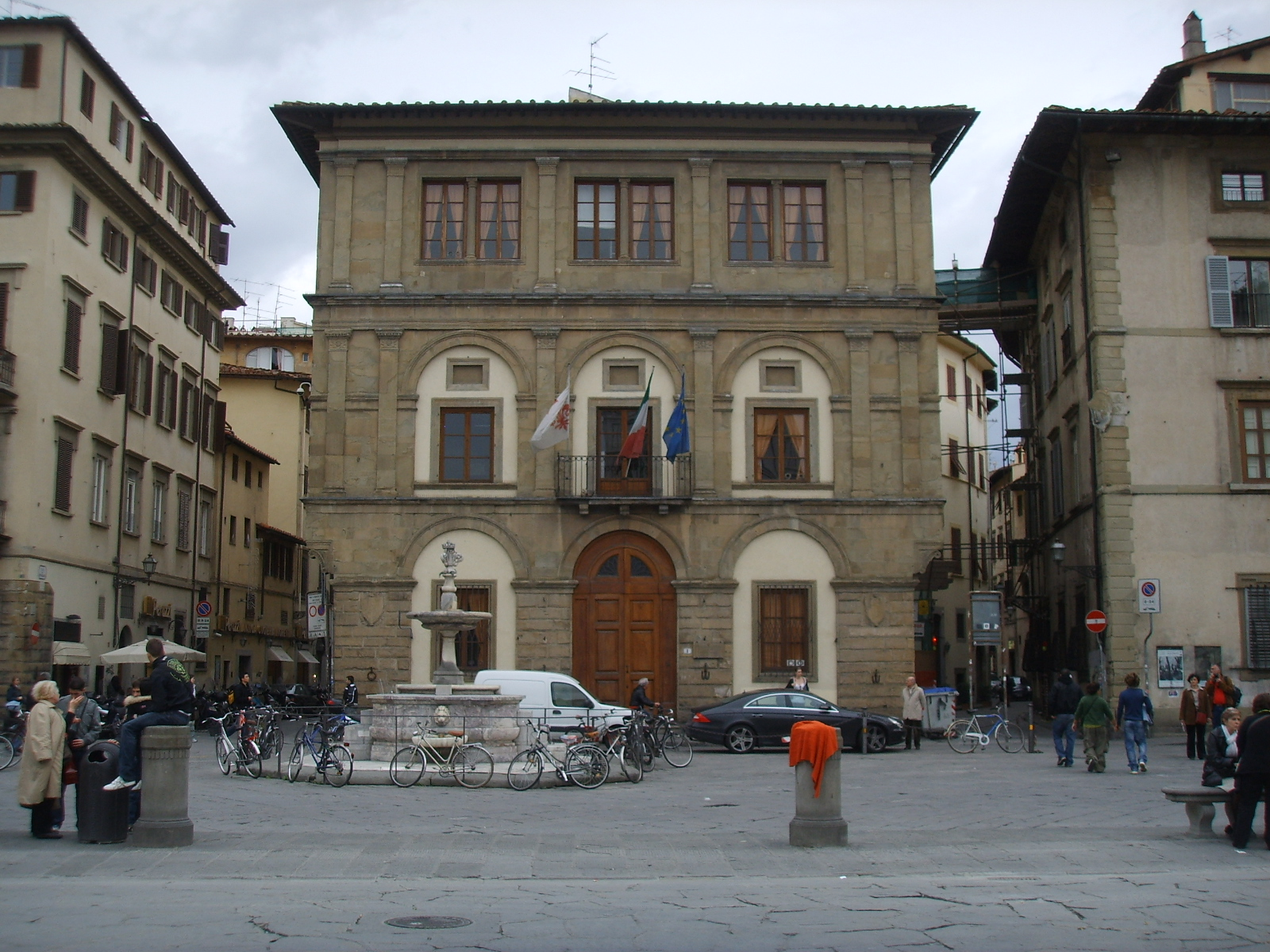
Palazzo Cocchi-Serristori.

Palazzo Cocchi-Serristori is a Renaissance-style palace in Piazza Santa Croce, Florence, Italy. It presently houses offices of a regional council of Florence.

== History ==
It is situated opposite to the church of Santa Croce, in the place where the city's 12th-century walls passed. Facing the church, on the right side of the piazza is the frescoed facade of the Palazzo dell'Antella.

The Cocchi-Serristori palace is a reconstruction of a pre-existing medieval edifice (owned by the Peruzzi), attributed to Giuliano da Sangallo, Baccio d'Agnolo or Simone del Pollaiolo. It has a cubic shape, built with polished stone, with three arcades in the façade enclosed in the original 14th-century piers. At the two upper floors are pilasters with finely sculpted capitals.

In the interior are a frescoed private chapel and, in the staircase, 18th-century frescoes attributed to Atanasio Bimbacci, Dionisio Predellini, and Giuseppe Collignon.

== Sources ==
- Vannucci, Marcello (1995). Splendidi palazzi di Firenze. Florence: Le Lettere.
