= Aromanian =

Aromanian may refer to:

- Aromanians, an ethnic group native to the Balkans
  - Aromanians in Albania
  - Aromanians in Bulgaria
  - Aromanians in Greece
  - Aromanians in North Macedonia
  - Aromanians in Romania
  - Aromanians in Serbia
- Aromanian language, their language, part of the Eastern Romance family
- Aromanian settlements, in the Balkans

== See also ==
- Aromanian dialect (disambiguation)
