= Vlachs of Serbia (disambiguation) =

Vlachs of Serbia are a Romanian-speaking group in eastern Serbia.

Vlachs of Serbia may also refer to:

- Romanians in Serbia, an ethnic Romanian group mainly living in the Banat region
- Vlachs in medieval Serbia, ethnic groups referred to as "Vlachs" throughout the Middle Ages in Serbia
- Aromanians in Serbia, sometimes referred to in Serbia as "Vlachs" but more usually as "Tsintsars"
- Megleno-Romanians in Serbia, another ethnic group sometimes known as "Vlachs"

== See also ==
- Vlachs in Bulgaria (disambiguation)
- Vlachs of North Macedonia (disambiguation)
