= University of Belgrade Faculty of Philology =

University faculty in Belgrade, Serbia

- Филолошки факултет Универзитета у Београду
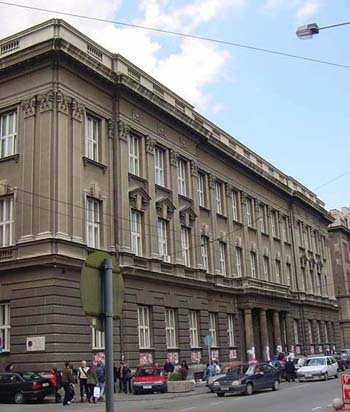
- Type: Public
- Established: 1808
- Dean: Iva Draškić Vićanović
- Academic staff: 311
- Students: 8,029
- Location: Belgrade, Serbia; 44.818976°N 20.457116°E
- Campus: Urban
- Website: fil.bg.ac.rs

The Faculty of Philology is one of the constituent schools of the University of Belgrade. The school's purpose is to train and educate its students in the academic study or practice in linguistics and philology.

== History ==
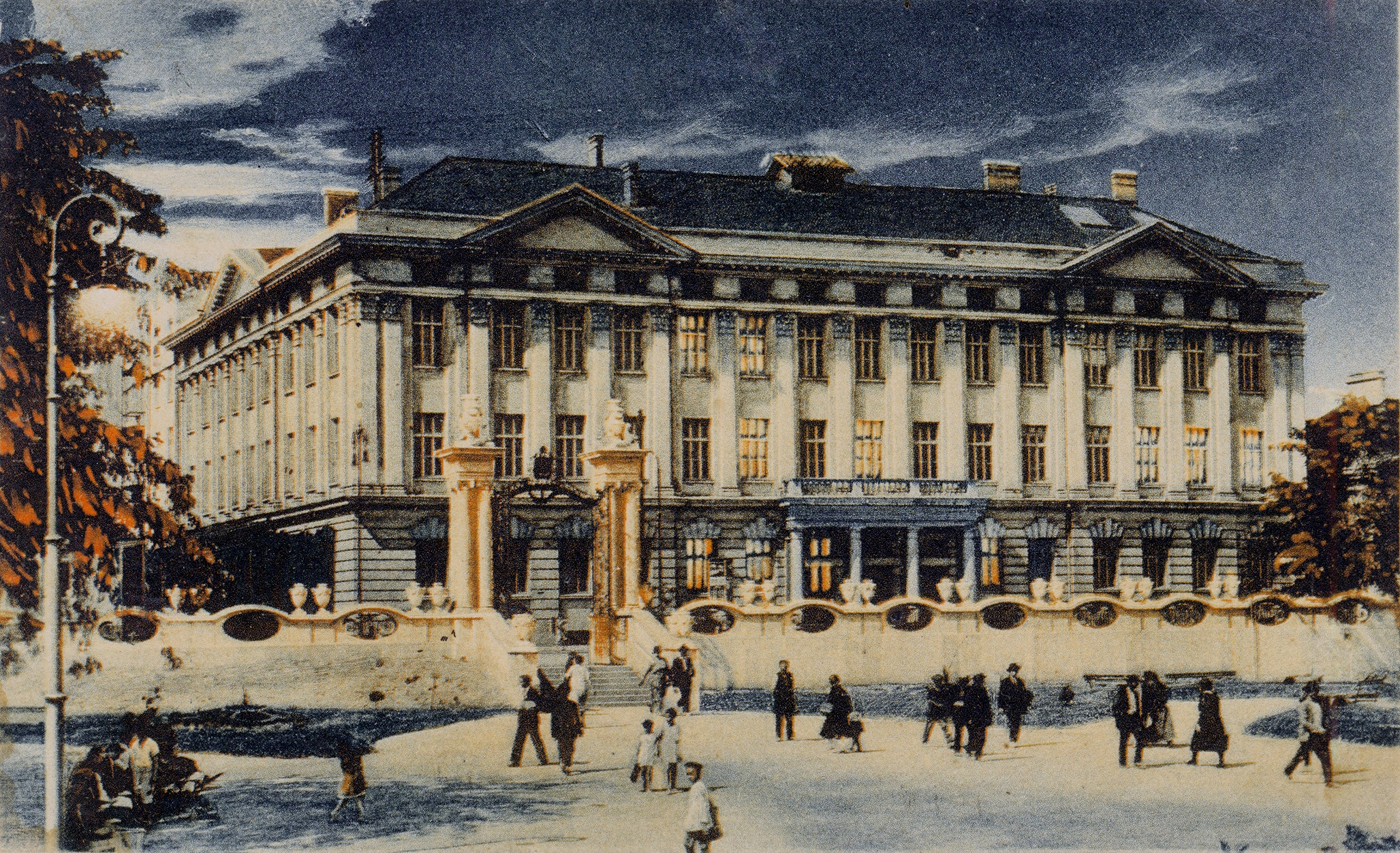
The building of the Faculty of Philology of Belgrade was built in 1922 according to the plans of the architect Petr Gačić. On a postcard printed between the two world wars, you can see the old appearance of the building when it was still used as a building of the Technical Faculties.

The study of philology was established in Belgrade within the Belgrade Higher School's Department of Philosophy in 1808. The Department of Philology gained independence from the University of Belgrade Faculty of Philosophy in 1960. Many eminent international philologists contributed to the development of the Faculty of Philology. For example, Russian Slavist Platon Kulikovsky, who was a visiting professor at the Higher School between 1877 and 1882, was the founder of Russian studies in Serbia; Englishman David Law started teaching English language and literature classes in 1907 and paved the way for the English Department (founded in 1929). Bruno Gujon from Italy worked at the Faculty from 1912 to 1914 and paved the way for Italian studies. During the post Second World War period the school established new departments, e.g. Romanian Language and Literature (1963), Spanish Language and Literature (1971), Arabic and Turkish Language and Literature Departments (1960), Chinese Language and Literature (1974), Japanese Language and Literature (1985), Scandinavian Languages (Swedish, Danish, Norwegian in 1986, starting with Norwegian Lectorate in 1979), Lectorates for Dutch (1987), Ukrainian (1989), Hebrew (1990), Library Science Department (1963), General Linguistics Department (1990), Hungarian Studies Department (1994), Greek Language and Literature Department (1995), et at.

== Organization ==
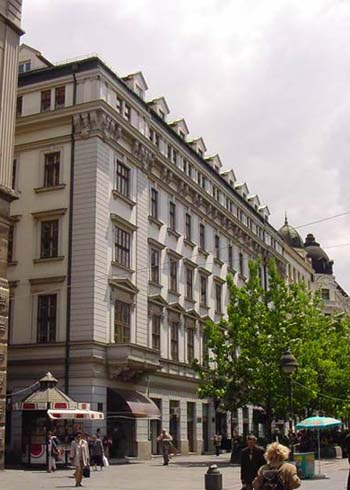
Faculty of Philology, view from Prince Michael Street

The school is divided into departments, including: Romance Studies, Iberian Studies, Italian Studies, Oriental Studies, Library Science and Information Technology, General Linguistics, Central and South-East Europe Studies, and 8.Social Sciences and Humanities Seminar. The departments offer academic courses in Serbian, Slavic, Bulgarian, Russian, Polish, Czech, Slovak, Ukrainian, Italian language, French language, Romanian language, Spanish language, German language, Scandinavian languages, Dutch, English, Arabic, Turkish language, Oriental philology, Japanese, Chinese, Albanian, Greek, Hungarian, General linguistics, and library studies. Numerous other languages are available as minor fields of study. Optional classes given in Aromanian and organized by the Lunjina Serbian–Aromanian Association to help the Aromanian minority in Serbia have also been proposed.

=== Department libraries ===
All school's departments possess their own libraries with unique collections built up over the years. In year 2000 the stock of all libraries comprised about 600 thousand items.

=== Periodical publications ===
The school's most known periodicals include: Prilozi za književnost, jezik, istoriju i folklor (as of 1921), Anali Filološkog fakulteta (1961) and Filološki pregled (as of 1997).

=== Research centers ===
The school hosts several centers, such as: Postgraduate and Doctoral Studies Center, International Center for Slavic Studies, Center for Serbian as a Foreign Language, Publishing, Science and Research Center, and East Asian Studies Center.
