= Ilija M. Kolarac Endowment =

- Задужбина Илије М. Коларца
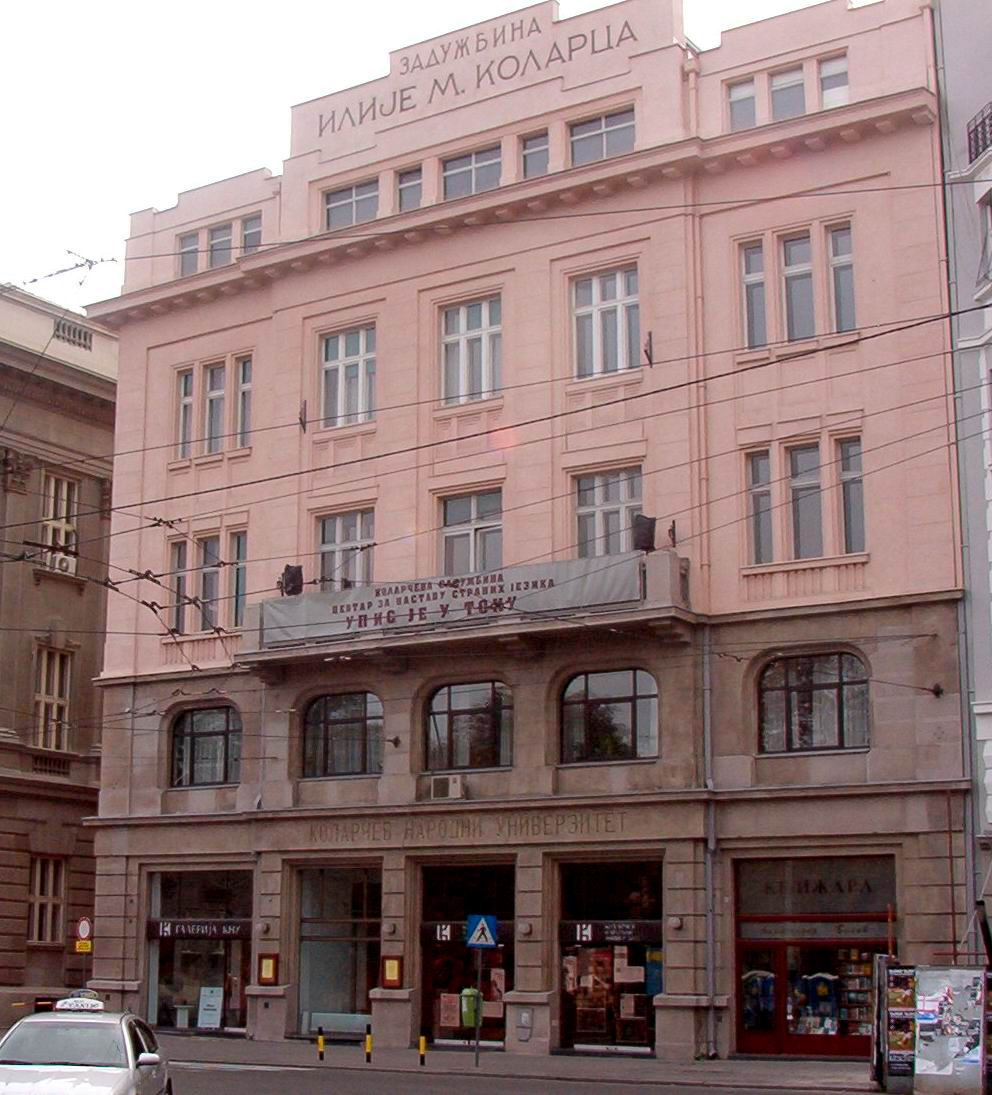
- View from outside

- Location within Belgrade

General information
- Location: 5 Students' Square, Belgrade, Serbia
- Coordinates: 44°49′08.8″N 20°27′22.7″E
- Construction started: 1929
- Completed: 1932
- Opened: 1932; 94 years ago

Design and construction
- Architect: Petar Bajalović

Ilija M. Kolarac Endowment (Serbian: Задужбина Илије М. Коларца, romanized: Zadužbina Ilije M. Kolarca), also known as the Kolarac People's University Building, is at 5 Students' Square in the heart of Belgrade. The building is a monument of a great cultural and historical importance and as such was declared as the immovable cultural property.

== History ==
The Kolarac People's University Building was erected at the time of the raising awareness about Belgrade as the capital of the new country and the needs of the metropolitan environment for the cultural centre. The first ideas about the construction of the building for the needs of public lectures and performances according to the program of a "people's university" appeared in 1928, when the competition for the Kolarac People's University Building at the Republika Square was announced. The first prize was won by the architect Andrej Papkov. However, since the regulation of this part of the Square – between Makedonska and Francuska Street was not definitely determined, the investor gave up the construction on this terrain, and in 1929 made the decision to erect the building on the endowment plot at 5 Students' Square. No competition was announced for the new location at the Students' Square; instead of that the project was directly assigned to the architect Petar Bajalović (1876–1947), a professor at the Technical Grand School and the author of significant buildings from the period before the First World War (The Pavilion in Rome, the residential building at 31 Francuska Street etc.). The construction of the building started in 1929, as the object in the inner part of the lot, in the courtyard of already existing two-storey building on the plot of the endowment of Ilija Milosavljević Kolarac. The idea was to use the old part of the object as the place for selling the tickets for the performances. In 1930a large concert hall with the capacity of around 1200 seats was erected, and was the largest one in Belgrade at the time. The next year, the decision was made to erect a new, four-storey building facing the street. Considering the fact that the endowment did not have enough material resources, the new object at the Students' Square was intended for rent, so the business premises were designed on the ground floor. The entrance with the cloakroom connected to the concert hall at the back was also designed in that area. Mezzanine was also intended for the rent, whereas upper floors were conceived as the reading room, smaller classrooms and rooms for the administration of the Kolarac People's University. The building was completed in 1932. In 1946 the building hosted the First Congress of the Association of Writers of Yugoslavia.

== Architecture and urbanism ==
The building covers almost entire irregularly shaped lot, on the corner of Students' Square and 1300 Kaplara Street. To the west, the lot was separated from the neighbouring lots by a one-way alley, whereas to the north it borders the line of residential and business objects as well as with the newly built Belgrade Philharmonic Orchestra building. Since it was built in phases, on the irregularly shaped lot, the building does not have its naturally developed structure. The layout and the architecture directly followed the changeable intentions of the investor. In general, the object bears the characteristics of moderate academism specific for the Belgrade of that time, and it does not differ a lot from many similar objects from the same period. There is an engraved inscription on the front facade "Ilija M. Kolarac Endowment".

== Cultural monument ==
The Kolarac People's University Building is the building of the monumental value, first of all because of its purpose and irreplaceable cultural role. It is conceived as the institution which through the cycles of lectures and other forms of education at the highest expert and scientific level, affects the development of the cultural environment. The lectures include various areas of human knowledge, from medicine, technics, philosophy, to the History of Art, and refer to world accomplishments as well as to the researches in local environment. The acoustic hall is particularly valuable, and even nowadays it is the venue of gathering of the music youth and the place of live concert activities. It is known as the most acoustic if not the only really acoustic hall in Belgrade. That is why it is the concerts of the most famous musicians in the world are organized in that hall. Except for the great hall, there is also a small hall on the first floor, where various lectures and promotions are held every day. Usually, these lectures are organized in cycles, and are held on certain days. Kolarac People's University is also important as the representative of the idea of endowment which remained preserved up to present time, and which enriched Belgrade for some of the most representative buildings. The programme concept of the art gallery on the ground floor is directed towards the artistic work of the young visual artists. One part of the Gallery is reserved for the selling of the artistic works of the artists who displayed their works in the Gallery. The bookshop "Aleksandar Belić" is oriented towards selling books from humanistic and social sciences. The People's University Building was declared as the cultural monument (The Decision, "The Official Gazette of the City of Belgrade", no. 23/84).

== See more ==
- Spisak spomenika kulture u Beogradu
- Ilija Milosavljević Kolarac
