= Piazza Santa Croce =

Square in Florence, Italy

Coordinates: 43°46′7.86″N 11°15′41.33″E

Piazza Santa Croce is one of the main plazas or squares located in the central neighbourhood of Florence, in the region of Tuscany, Italy. It is located near Piazza della Signoria and the National Central Library, and takes its name from the Basilica of Santa Croce that overlooks the square.

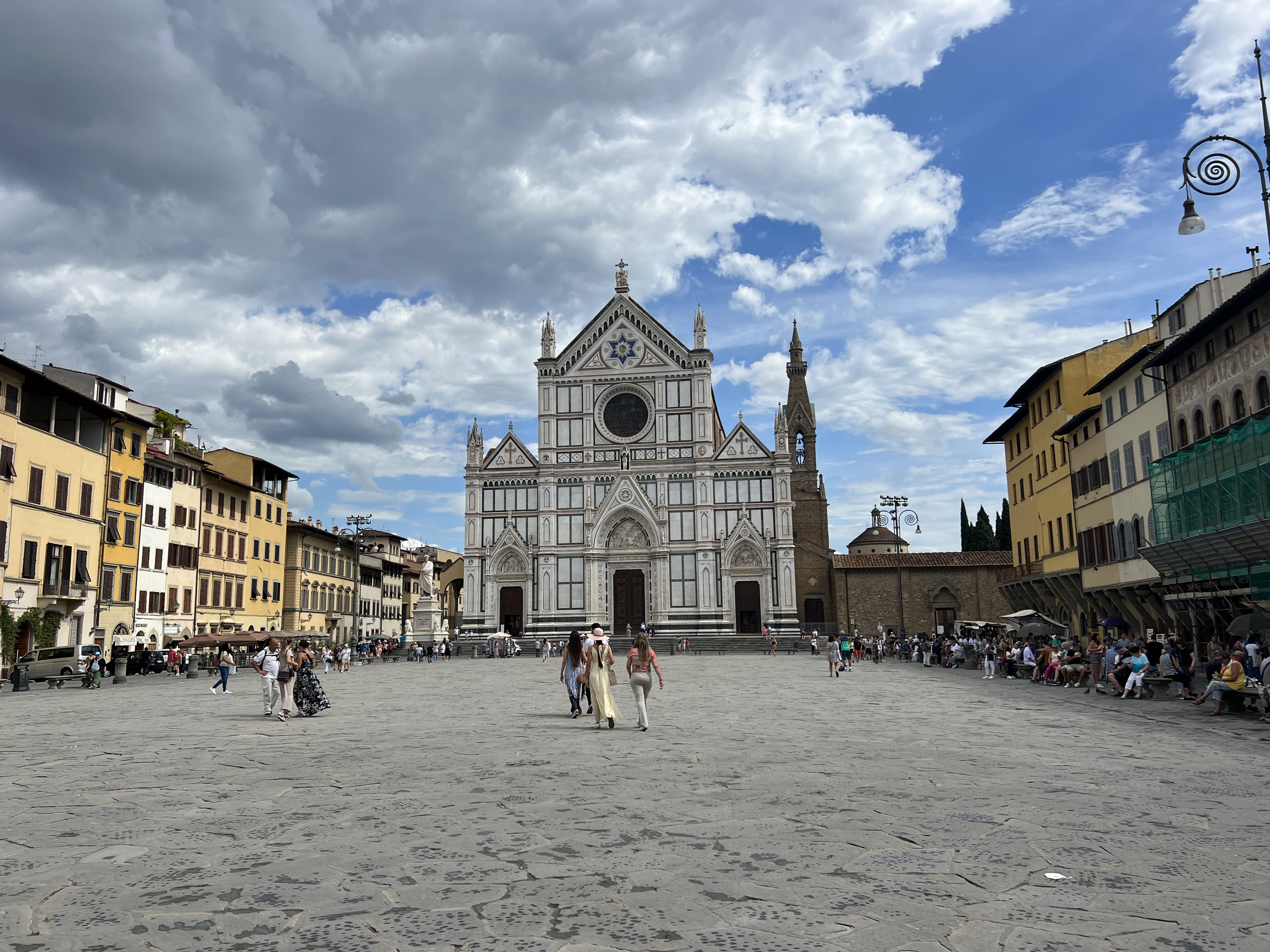
The square, with the Basilica of Santa Croce

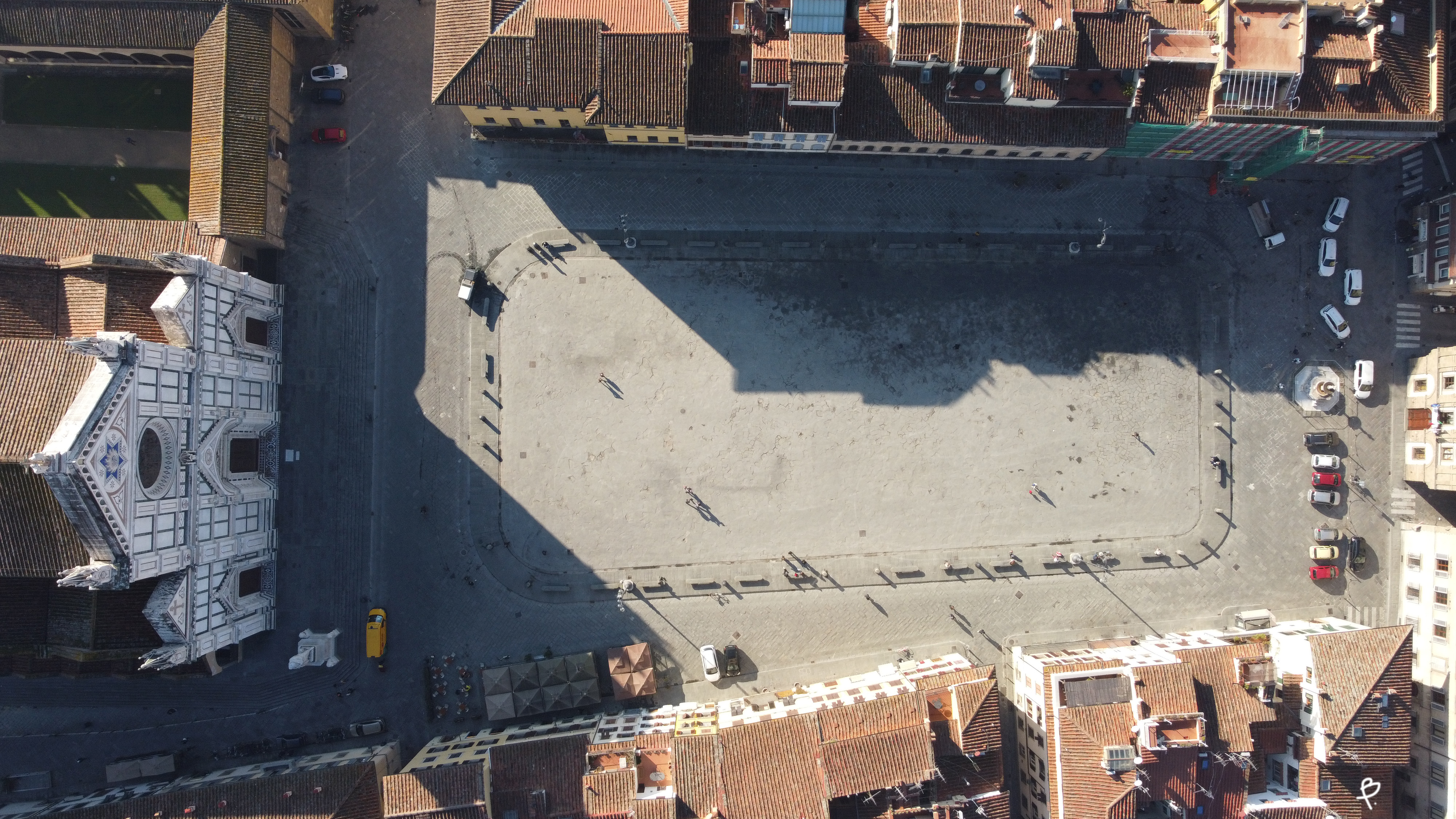
An aerial view of the Piazza Santa Croce in Florence

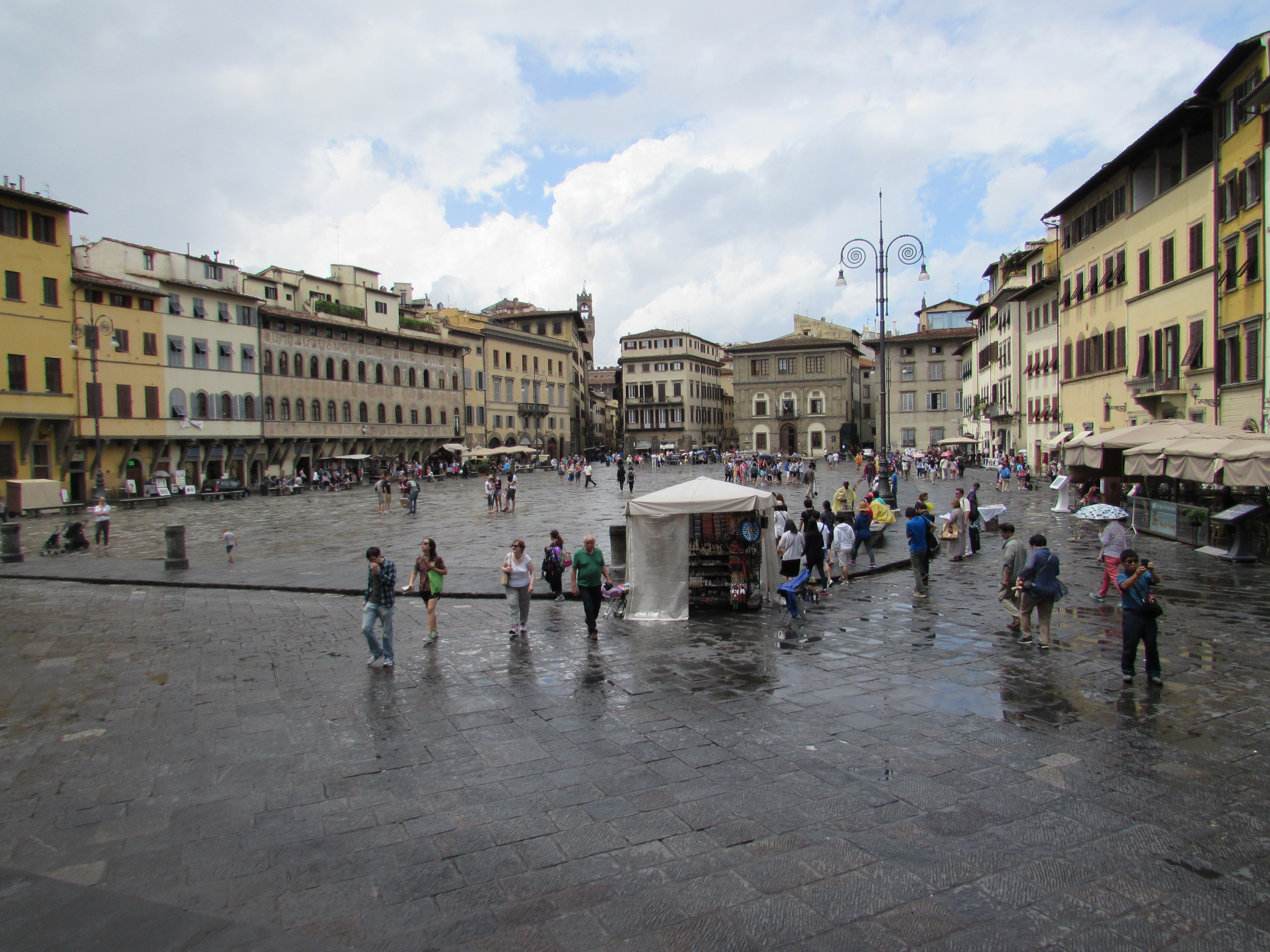
The Piazza seen from the Dante monument in front of the church

== Main buildings ==
=== Basilica of Santa Croce ===
The most notable features of the basilica are its sixteen chapels, many of them decorated with frescoes by Giotto and his pupils, and its tombs and cenotaphs.

It is the burial place of many illustrious Italians, such as Michelangelo, Machiavelli, Enrico Fermi, Galileo, Ugo Foscolo, Guglielmo Marconi, Luigi Cherubini, Leon Battista Alberti, Vittorio Alfieri, Gioachino Rossini, Lorenzo Ghiberti, Lorenzo Bartolini, Pier Antonio Micheli, Bartolomeo Cristofori, Giovanni Gentile, thus it is known also as the Temple of the Italian Glories (Tempio dell'Itale Glorie).

=== Palazzo Cocchi-Serristori ===
On the opposite side to the Basilica of Santa Croce is the Palazzo Cocchi-Serristori, rebuilt in the late 15th century by Giuliano da Sangallo, personal architect of Lorenzo de' Medici. In the front of the Palazzo, there is a fountain from the 19th century.

=== Palazzo dell'Antella ===
On the southern side of the square is the Palazzo dell'Antella, a long palace with a facade decorated in the early 17th century under the direction of Giovanni da San Giovanni.

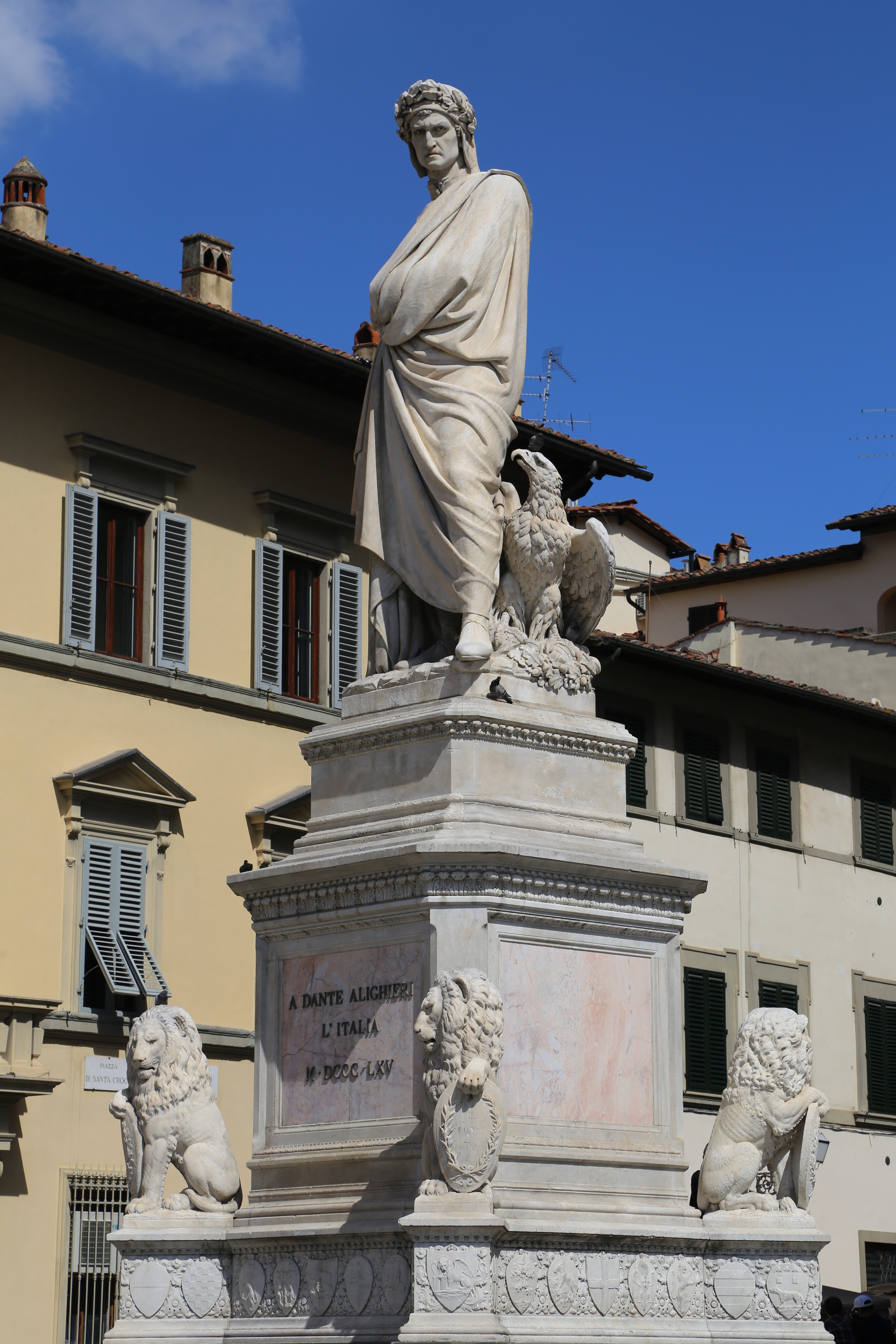
The Monument to Dante by Enrico Pazzi (1865)

=== Sculptures ===
In front of the basilica is a marble statue depicting Dante sculpted by Enrico Pazzi, named Monument to Dante.

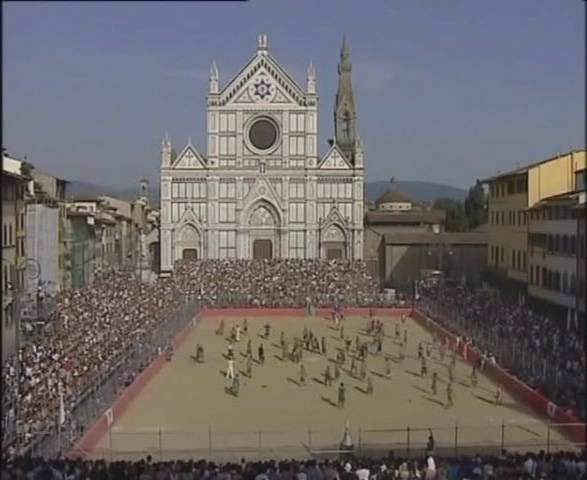
The Calcio Storico Fiorentino

== Events ==
Every year in June, a field of sand is prepared for the annual Calcio Fiorentino (historic football) games. The game is fairly violent; boxing and wrestling are allowed and minor injuries are frequent.

In 2006 Roberto Benigni recited Dante's Divine Comedy beside the statue of Dante.
