= Vlachs of North Macedonia =

Vlachs of North Macedonia may refer to:

- Aromanians, commonly known as "Vlachs" in North Macedonia
  - Aromanians in North Macedonia
- Megleno-Romanians, also commonly known as "Vlachs" in the country
  - Megleno-Romanians in North Macedonia

== See also ==
- Vlachs of Bulgaria (disambiguation)
- Vlachs of Serbia (disambiguation)
