= Lunjina Serbian–Aromanian Association =

Aromanian cultural organization in Serbia

- Sutsata sãrbeascã-armãneascã Lunjina; Српско-цинцарско друштво Луњина / Srpsko-cincarsko društvo Lunjina
- Logo of the Lunjina Serbian–Aromanian Association
- Formation: 1991; 34 years ago
- Type: NGO
- Headquarters: Belgrade
- Location: Serbia
- President: Aristotel Martinović
- Website: Official website (defunct)

The Lunjina Serbian–Aromanian Association (Aromanian: Sutsata sãrbeascã-armãneascã Lunjina; Serbian: Српско-цинцарско друштво Луњина / Srpsko-cincarsko društvo Lunjina, СЦД Луњина / SCD Lunjina) is an organization of Aromanians in Serbia with its headquarters at Belgrade, the capital of the country. It was founded in 1991 as a result of the merge of two Aromanian organizations at Dolna Belica and Gorna Belica, which are two Aromanian villages in North Macedonia. The aim of the organization is to protect the Aromanian minority in Serbia and preserve its customs, culture, language, name and traditions. In 2017, the Lunjina Serbian–Aromanian Association had around 500 members. The president of the organization is Aristotel Martinović. In Aromanian, the word lunjinã means "light". In the closely related Romanian language, this word is lumină.

Most members of the Lunjina Serbian–Aromanian Association are recent ethnic Aromanian immigrants from North Macedonia, with only a small part of them being descendants of the Aromanian community that has lived in Serbia for centuries. The organization has published several books on Aromanian grammar and a CD of traditional Aromanian music and publishes the journal Light. Bulletin of the Serbian–Aromanian Association. It has also been proposed that the Lunjina Serbian–Aromanian Association organize optional courses in Aromanian at the University of Belgrade Faculty of Philology.

Members of the Lunjina Serbian–Aromanian Association are among the few Aromanians in Serbia who continue to actively practice and use their language and culture. In fact, between 2014 and 2017, this organization offered weekly Aromanian-language courses, but these were discontinued due to a lack of students and were replaced by Anveatsã armaneashti! (Learn Aromanian!), an online platform to learn Aromanian created in Romania.

The Lunjina Serbian–Aromanian Association has strived for the recognition of the Aromanians as a national minority in Serbia, but this has been rejected so far since they did not meet the minimum number of people that a community must have to be granted this status, which is 300, in the 2011 Serbian census. The Aromanians in Serbia number between 5,000 to 15,000 people, but only 243 people declared themselves ethnic "Tsintsar" (i.e. Aromanian, "Tsintsar" being the name Serbs use for the Aromanians) in the 2011 census. This figure ascended to 327 in the 2022 census, meeting the threshold.

== See also ==
- Aromanians in Serbia
- List of Aromanian cultural organizations
