= Vlachs in Bulgaria =

Vlachs in Bulgaria may refer to:

- Romanians in Bulgaria, often referred to as Vlachs, specially in historical contexts
- Aromanians in Bulgaria, sometimes referred to as Vlachs as well
- Boyash, a Romanian-speaking Gypsy subgroup whose members are known as Vlach Gypsies in Bulgaria

== See also ==
- Second Bulgarian Empire, formed with a joint Bulgarian–Vlach (Romanian) rebellion
- Vlachs of North Macedonia (disambiguation)
- Vlachs of Serbia (disambiguation)
