= The Genius of Victory =

Marble sculpture by Michelangelo

- Artist: Michelangelo
- Year: c. 1532–1534
- Type: sculpture
- Medium: Marble
- Dimensions: 261 cm (103 in)
- Location: Palazzo Vecchio, Florence
- Preceded by: Medici Madonna
- Followed by: Rachel (sculpture)

The Genius of Victory is a 1532–1534 marble sculpture by Michelangelo, produced as part of a design for the tomb of Pope Julius II. It measures 2.61m in height and is presently located at the Salone dei Cinquecento of the Palazzo Vecchio in Florence.

== History ==
The exact date of execution of the statue is unknown, though it is usually associated with the project for the tomb of Julius II. It is thought to have been intended for one of the lower niches of one of the last projects for the tomb, perhaps that of 1532, for which the so-called Captives or "Prisoners" now in the Galleria dell'Accademia of Florence may have also been made. Another possibility is that the monument was coupled with a similar pair of fighters, a clay model in the Casa Buonarroti–the so-called Hercules-Samson.

In its unfinished state, the statue of Victory stands as an interesting footnote in history: left in the artist's studio after his final departure from Florence in 1534, it became the property of his nephew, Leonardo Buonarroti, who first tried to sell it in 1544 without receiving the necessary authorization from his uncle. Then, at the suggestion of Daniele da Volterra, he tried to place it on Michelangelo's tomb in Santa Croce (1564), but Giorgio Vasari, who was redesigning the church's interior, was against it being used there. At Vasari's suggestion, the statue was given to Duke Cosimo I de' Medici that year. Two early "Captives" originally intended for Julius's tomb ended up in France, while four larger figures, created much later, now in Florence's Accademia, were initially placed in Buontalenti's Grotto in the Boboli Gardens, after the artist's death. The Victory came to decorate the Salone dei Cinquecento of the Palazzo Vecchio. It was placed along the wall, among other victory groups inspired by Michelangelo, such as the statues of the Labors of Hercules by Vincenzo de' Rossi and others.

In 1868, three years after the opening of the National Museum of the Bargello, the statue was included in the collection of Florentine sculpture gathered in the museum. It was returned to the Palazzo Vecchio on 6 November 1921 and placed in a niche in the center of the back wall of the room, where, since the time Florence had been the capital of Italy (1865), the 19th-century statue of Savonarola had stood (now in Piazza Savonarola). Only in recent years has the Victory been restored to its former position along the right wall.

== Description and style ==
The dating and attribution of the statue to the project of the tomb are based on stylistic elements that link the work to the Captives: the twisting of the body and the vigorous anatomy, as well as comparable proportions. In addition, the head has a crown of oak leaves that allude to the emblem of Della Rovere.

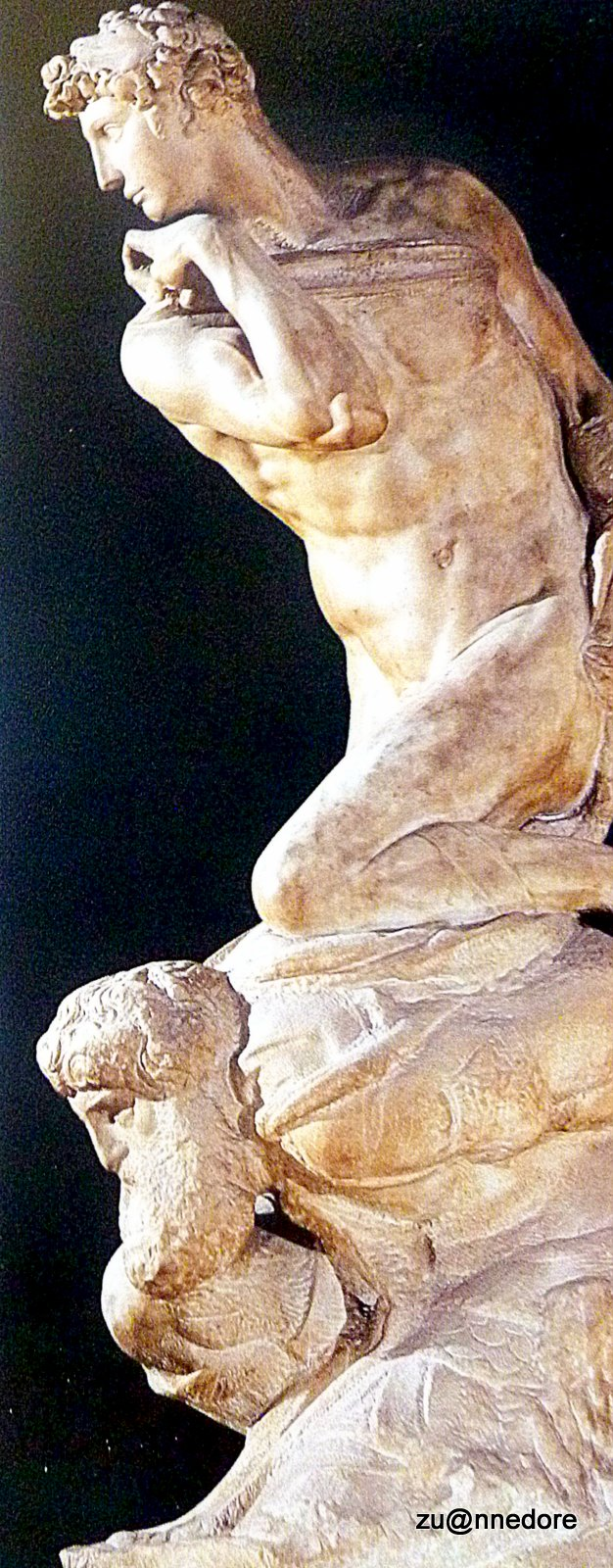
Side view

The sculpture does not capture a moment of fighting, but rather serves as an allegory of triumph. It depicts the winner who dominates the submissive loser with great agility, with one leg blocking the body of a captive who is folded and chained. The victorious young man is beautiful and elegant, while the dominated man is old and bearded, and dressed in the garb of an ancient Roman warrior. The surfaces are treated expressively to deepen the contrast between the two figures: the young polished to perfection, the old rough and incomplete and still retaining the compressed boulder-like solidity of the heavy stone from which it was made.

According to some scholars, the inspiration for the titular figure was Tommaso dei Cavalieri, a young Roman nobleman known to Michelangelo in Rome in 1532, to whom he dedicated love poems, and the older figure alludes to Michelangelo himself. The two men remained close to each other throughout their lives. When Michelangelo died, aged 88, Tommaso de’ Cavalieri was at his bedside.

== See also ==
- List of works by Michelangelo
