= Aromanian dialect =

Aromanian dialect may refer to:

- Aromanian language, referred to as a dialect of Romanian by some Romanian scholars
- Aromanian dialects, the dialects of the Aromanian language

== See also ==
- Aromanian (disambiguation)
