= Enrico Pazzi =

Italian sculptor (1818–1899)

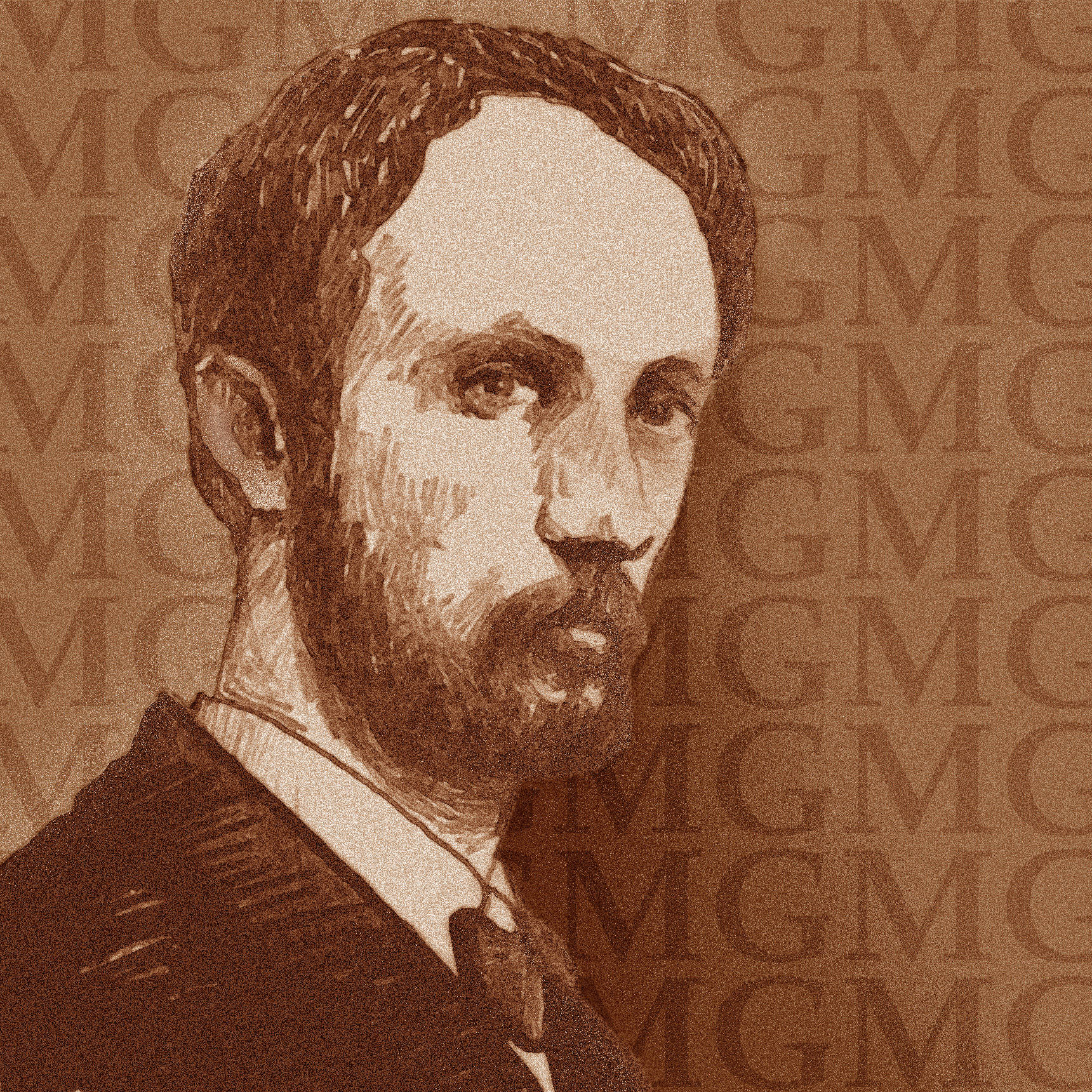
- Born: 20 June 1818; Ravenna, Papal States (present-day Italy)
- Died: 2 May 1899 (aged 80); Florence, Kingdom of Italy
- Known for: Sculptor
- Notable work: Monument to Dante; Prince Mihailo Monument; Monument to Savonarola
- Style: Realism

Enrico Pazzi (20 June 1818 – 27 March 1899) was an Italian sculptor, mainly active in Florence, Italy. He is known for his Monument to Dante (1857-1865) in the Piazza Santa Croce, Florence, and for the Prince Mihailo Monument in the center of Serbian capital city Belgrade.

== Biography ==
In 1833, he enrolled in the Institute of Fine Arts of Ravenna, his birthplace, under Ignazio Sarti. He was fired after an angry outburst where he destroyed one of his incomplete works at the eve of the yearly exhibition. With the help of the cardinal Legate of the city, Luigi Amat, he was readmitted to the Academy. With a stipend from the Academy, he moved to Florence and worked under the mentorship (1845-1851) of Giovanni Duprè. Enrico opened a studio on Via dei Maccheroni with fellow artist from Ravenna, Luigi Majoli.

== Monument to Dante ==
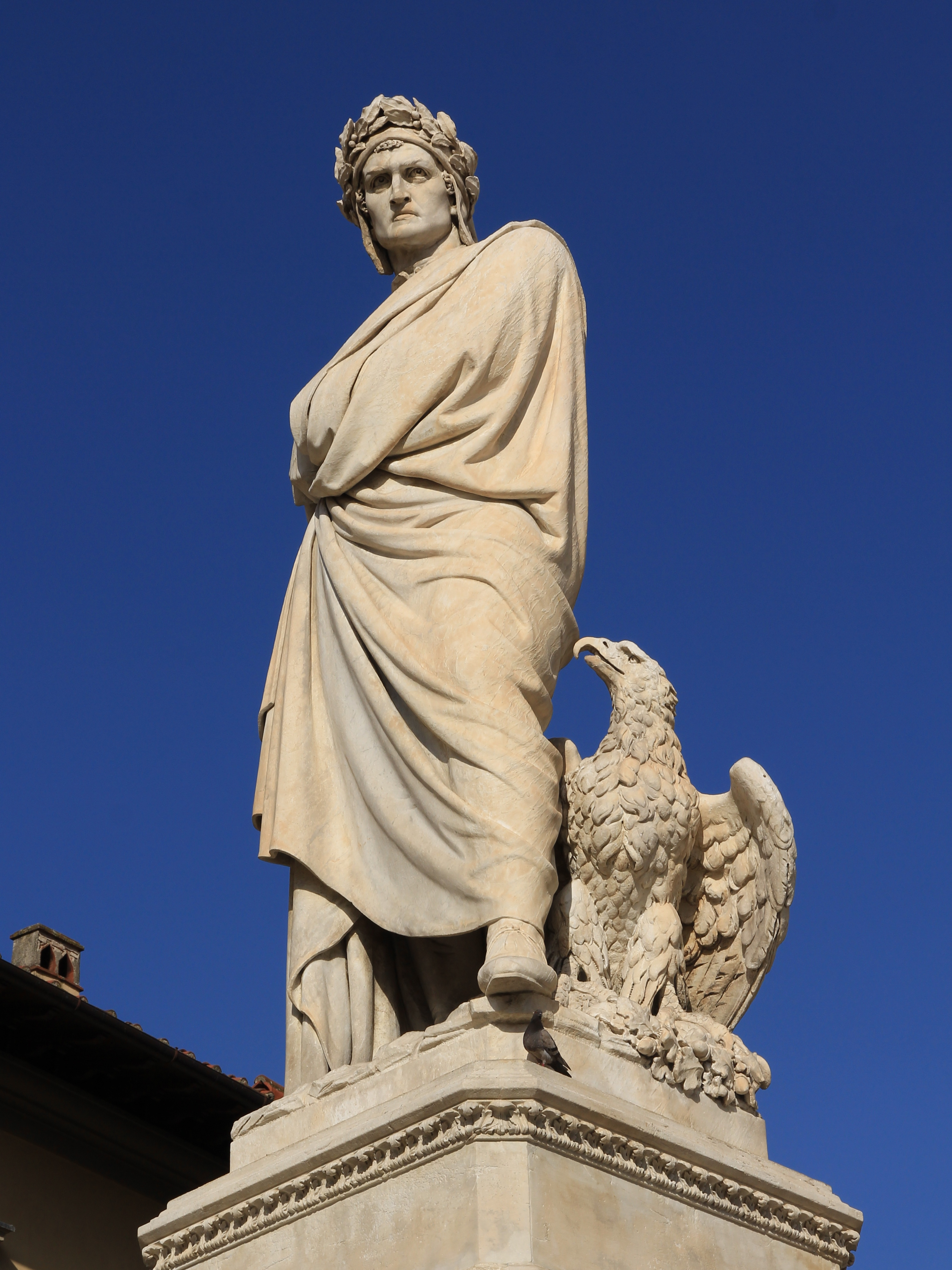
Monument to Dante, Florence

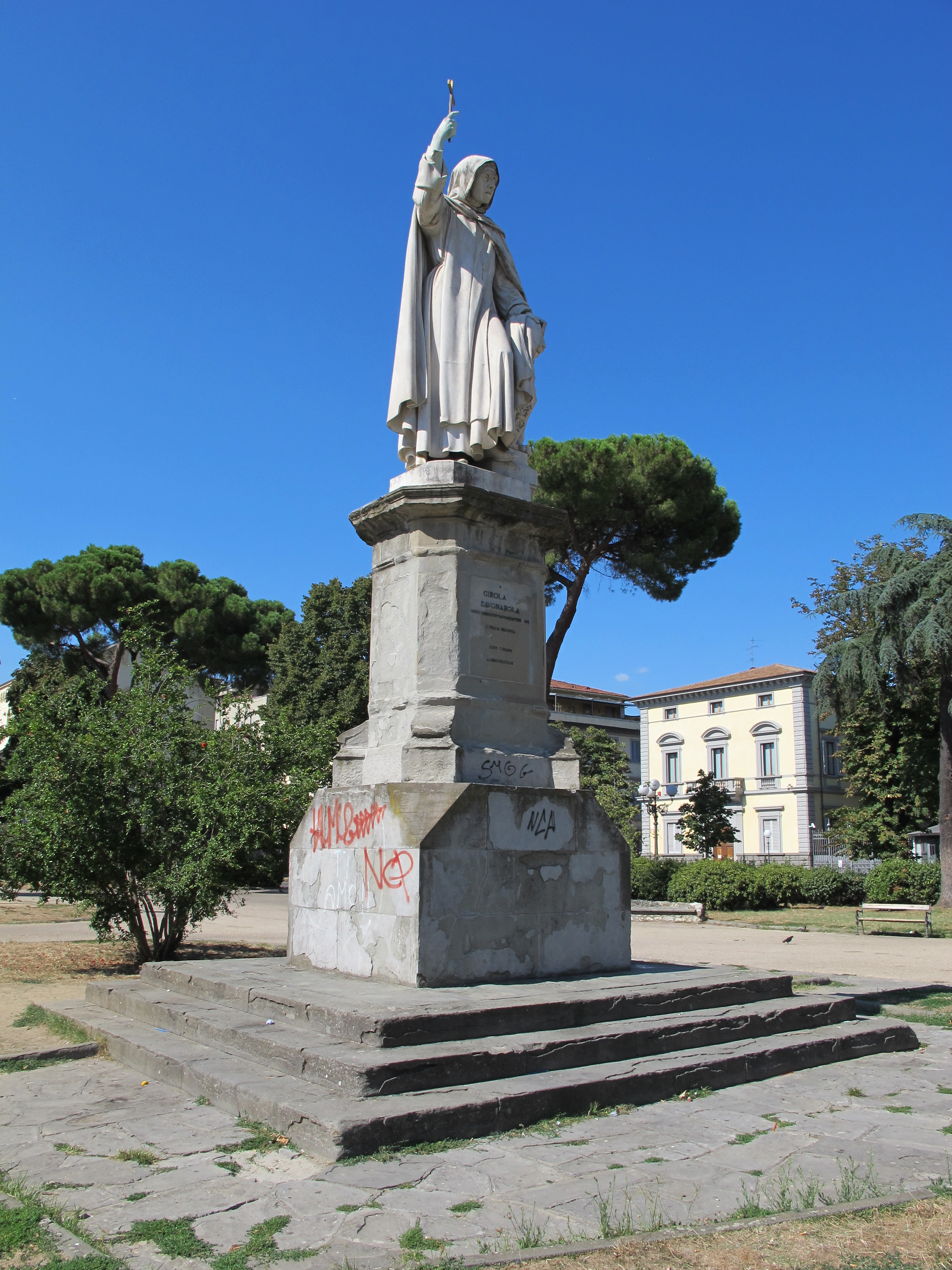
Monument to Savonarola, Florence

In the early 1850s, a project for a statue of Dante for a piazza in Ravenna was declined. Pazzi subsisted on small private projects for tomb monuments and house decorations. He completed for Dupre a commission for a nativity scene, destined for the Signora Bianchi of Siena, however, had difficulty getting paid.

In the 1857–1859, a move was made to complete the Dante statue, but now for Florence. The patriotic Pazzi recalls an unfortunate episode when the Prince Leopold, Count of Syracuse (brother of the King of Naples) visited the studio accompanied by the interior minister of the Grand Duke, Leopold II. The visiting Prince inquired why Dante was surrounded by beasts. Pazzi indicated the lions were the Marzocchi, long a symbol of Medici Florence. However, when asked why the eagle did not have a double head, the symbol of the Habsburg dynasty, Pazzi impertinently replied that this was a Roman Eagle, arising from the ashes of the fallen Roman Empire. With this, the retinue left. Pazzi's statue would take nearly half a decade to rise in the piazza.

Pazzi's Monument to Savonarola would also have a tortuous and controversial route to finding a home in Florence.
