= Monument to Savonarola in Piazza Savonarola =

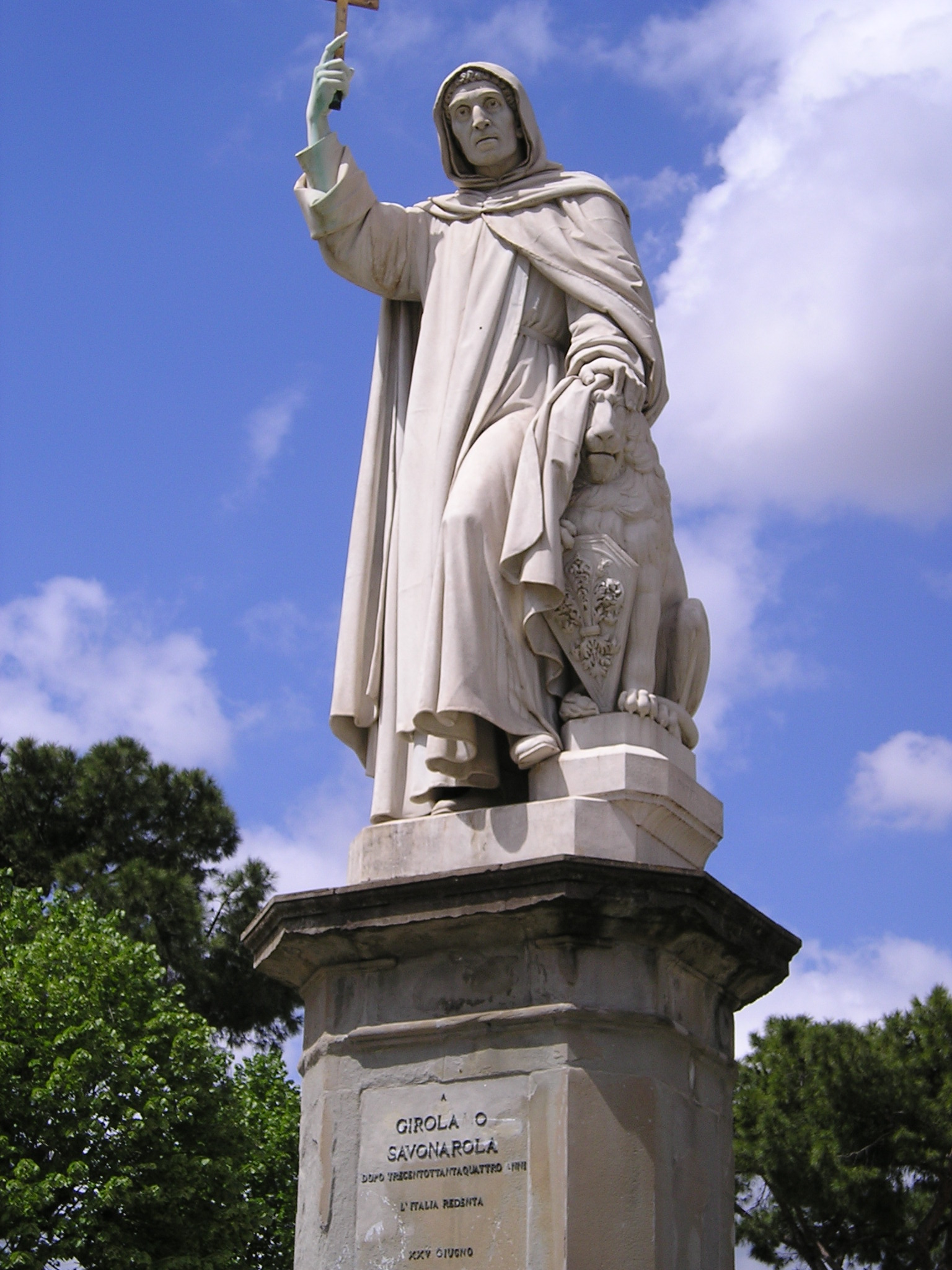
- Savonarola Monument by Enrico Pazzi
- Location: Florence, Tuscany, Italy
- Coordinates: 43°46′54″N 11°16′00″E
- Designer: Enrico Pazzi
- Type: Monument
- Material: Marble
- Opening date: 1875
- Dedicated to: Girolamo Savonarola

The Monument to Savonarola in Piazza Savonarola is an outdoor marble statue on a plinth in honor of the 15th-century Dominican friar Girolamo Savonarola; it is located in a piazza of the same name a few blocks outside of the Viali di Circonvallazione, in Northeastern Florence, region of Tuscany, Italy.

This monument has a colorful history of migrations. The statue was completed circa 1875 by Enrico Pazzi, a native of Ravenna, at a time, when anti-papal feelings ran high in Italy. However, Savonarola has always been a polarizing historic figure, maniacal in his faith, and the perpetrator of the original Bonfire of the Vanities. His theology was not compatible with contemporary liberal thought.

The statue was conceived by Pazzi in 1861, who habitually created public monuments before they were requisitioned. A committee was formed in 1869 to commission a monument to Savonarola, which was to be placed in the convent of San Marco; however, they did not choose Pazzi's model, but instead chose one by Giovanni Duprè, a former mentor of Pazzi. This was to lead to fierce conflict between the two sculptors. In 1870, another committee, chaired by Prince Ferdinando Strozzi, selected to commission Pazzi's more grandiose and more anti-papal statue, and obtained the Commune's permission to site the sculpture in the first cloister of the Florentine convent. However, the drop in revenue caused by the transfer of the capital of Italy from Florence to Rome, cancelled this project.

By 1873, Duprè completed his contribution: a simple plaque and relief bust placed in the cell of the friar in San Marco. Pazzi's work, completed only in 1875, did not find enough subscribers, and was donated ultimately to the Town Hall. It remained in studio till 1882, when it was installed, to much criticism, into the niche of the southern end of the Salone dei Cinquecento in the Palazzo Vecchio. One justification for this placement was that Savonarola had commissioned the creation of this large hall in 1497. There was still rumors that it would be moved in the future to the precinct of San Marco. The statue had displaced none other than a Michelangelo statue, placed here by Vasari.

Even in this niche, Savonarola's provincial and other-worldly causes did not fit the Italian nationalism that was in demand after the recent world war. In addition, many Florentine critics were never content with the removal of the heroic Genius of Victory by Michelangelo. Ultimately, even if unfinished, the subtle Michelangelo work was able to vanquish the polished sculpture of the somewhat unsufferable, faith-frenzied priest. In 1921, Savonarola's statue was exiled to this graffiti-ridden suburban park. In some ways, the Ferrarese priest was never quite at home in Florence.

Savonarola stands on a plinth designed by Olinto Rimediotti. Savonarola is depicted with his right hand while raising a Cross, recalling his declaration during a public sermon in 1495, that Christ was the new King of Florence. The left hand of his gown protects, or perhaps smothers, the Marzocco, a symbol of the Republic of Florence. Restoration of the monument has been planned.

The statue lacks the commanding and hypnotic drama of the bronze Monument to Girolamo Savonarola in Ferrara by Stefano Galletti.
