= Palazzo dell'Antella =

Coordinates: 43°46′7.35″N 11°15′40.15″E

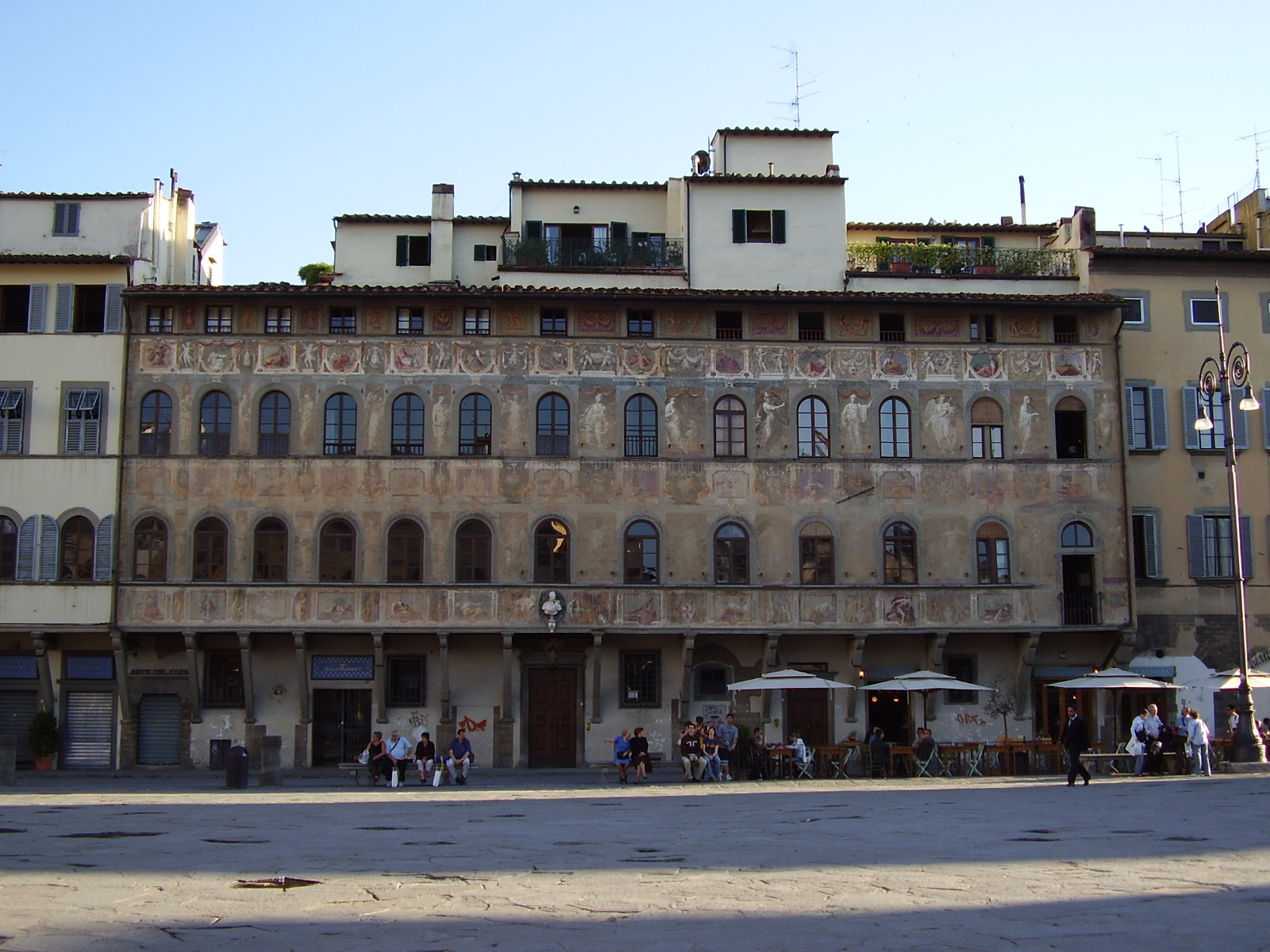
Palazzo dell'Antella.

Palazzo dell'Antella (also Palazzo Atellesi) is a palace with a frescoed façade located on Piazza Santa Croce, Florence, region of Tuscany, Italy.

== History ==
Of medieval origins, it was first enlarged in the late 16th century with the addition of a top floor. In the early 17th century it was acquired by Niccolò dell'Antella, together with a nearby one: he commissioned the repainting of the two façades, executed in 1619-1620 by a group of artists (including Domenico Passignano, Matteo Rosselli, Ottavio Vannini and others) under the direction of Giovanni da San Giovanni, and the design of architect Giulio Parigi.

The painted decoration consists of a series of panels with allegorical representations, puttos, flowers, vegetable motifs and arabesques. At the centre is the bust of Cosimo II de' Medici.

As they become closer to the church of Santa Croce, the windows are nearer to each other, in order to provide an illusory enlargement of the façade. The internal garden once housed a marble fountain and a statue of "Youth" by Giambologna, now disassembled in the Hermitage Museum of St. Petersburg and the Victoria and Albert Museum of London.

Today, the ground floor is used by restaurants and shops, and the upper floors are luxury apartments.

== Sources ==
- Vannucci, Marcello (1995). Splendidi palazzi di Firenze. Florence: Le Lettere.
