= Prince Mihailo Monument =

Monument in Belgrade, Serbia

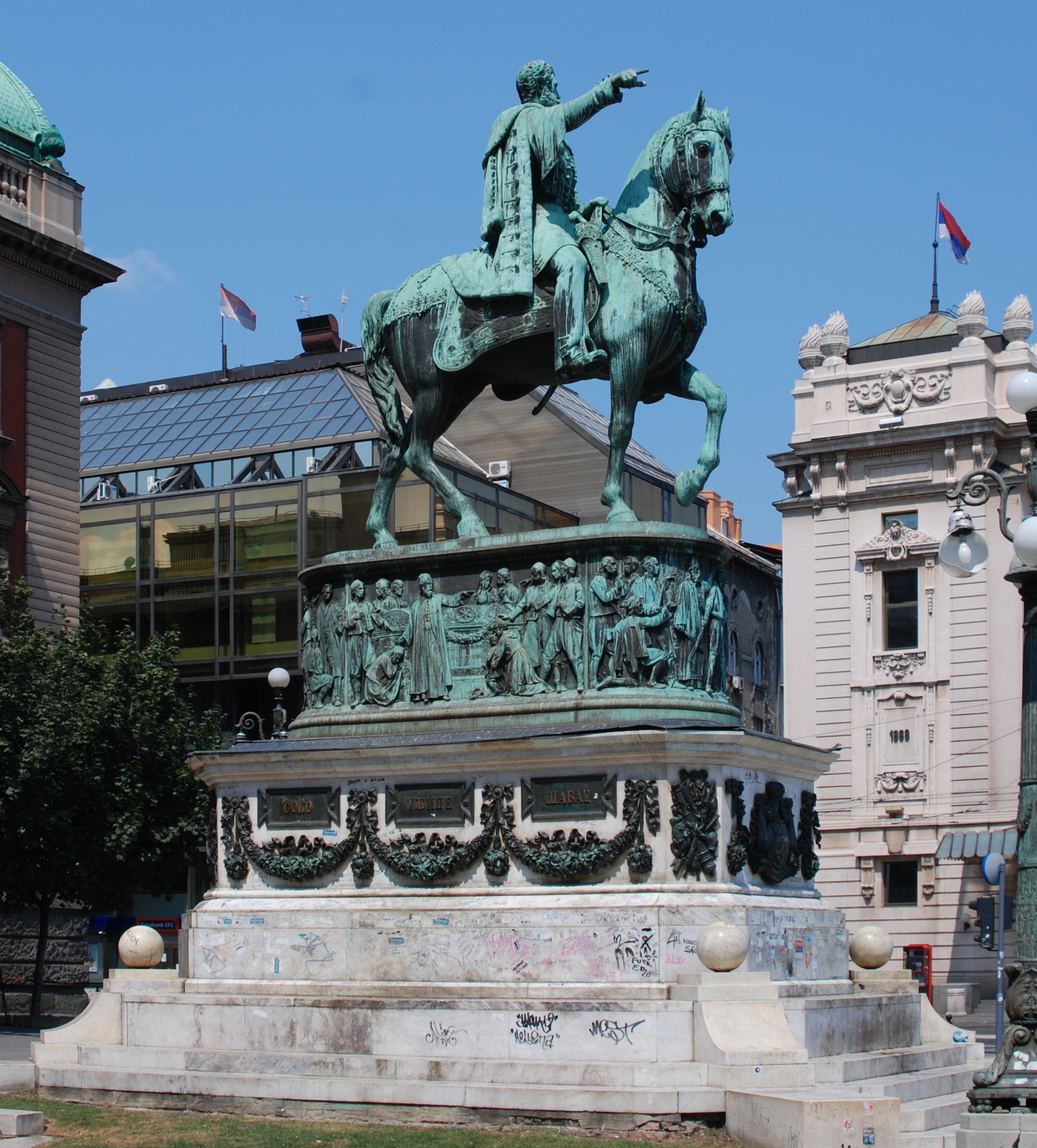
- The monument in 2009
- Artist: Enrico Pazzi
- Year: 1882
- Type: Sculpture
- Medium: Bronze
- Subject: Mihailo Obrenović III
- Location: Belgrade, Serbia; 44°48′59″N 20°27′36″E

Prince Mihailo Monument (Serbian: Споменик кнезу Михаилу, romanized: Spomenik knezu Mihailu) is a monument of Prince Mihailo. It is located in the main Republic Square in Belgrade, Serbia, and was erected in 1882. It was the first public monument with representation of an equestrian figure of a ruler in Serbia. The monument is by Italian sculptor Enrico Pazzi. Reliefs on the monument were performed according to the drawings of architect Konstantin Jovanović. The monument was declared a Monument of Culture of Great Importance in 1979 and it is protected by Republic of Serbia, as the oldest and the most representative figural Serbian memorial.

== Mihailo Obrenović III, Prince of Serbia ==
Prince Mihailo (1823–1868) was Prince of Serbia from 1839 to 1842 and again from 1860 to 1868. His rule began after the death of his elder brother until 1842, when he was ousted in a revolt led by Toma Vučić-Perišić.

Prince Mihailo came to the throne a second time, after the death of his father, Miloš Obrenović I, in 1860. He ruled for eight years as the absolutists, making progress in Serbia, harmonized agreements with neighboring countries, for common action in the Balkans. During the second reign of Prince Mihailo, Turkish authorities handed over the remaining cities of Belgrade, Šabac, Smederevo, Soko, Užice and Kladovo back to Serbia. In 1868, Prince Mihailo Obrenović was assassinated in the Košutnjak.

== History ==
=== Origin ===
During the second half of the 19th century in Belgrade, an increasing number of monuments, representing numerous prominent personalities from the cultural and political life of Serbia, were erected. An official Serbian state delegation visited Russia in May 1867. After meeting with the Emperor Alexander II in Saint Petersburg, the delegates visited the All-Russian Ethnology Exhibition in Moscow. They noticed the watercolor painting Liberation of Serbia, actually a design for the monumental project by the sculptor Mikhail Mikeshin. They brought the painting to Belgrade and the prince liked the idea. He contacted Mikeshin and invited him to Serbia to work on the project.

However, the assassination of the prince on 10 June 1868, delayed the artist's visit. The Board for the erection of the monument was formed already on 14 June 1868 and decided to collect donations for the construction of both the church in Košutnjak, at the assassination location, and a monumental sculpture in the city itself. Out of the respect for the assassinated ruler, Mikeshin in Moscow drafted the design for the memorial church or chapel in Košutnjak. After arriving in Belgrade in October 1868, and inspecting the city, in cooperation with the government and the Board, he proposed two designs for the monument to the prince, which was to be erected at the Great Market, or the modern Studentski Trg. After the public display, the citizens apparently liked the designs and approved the building. Painter Stevan Todorović ordered the lithographs to be made in Vienna. However, the process of building the memorials dragged on, and in 1871 Mikeshin's propositions were rejected.

=== International Competition ===
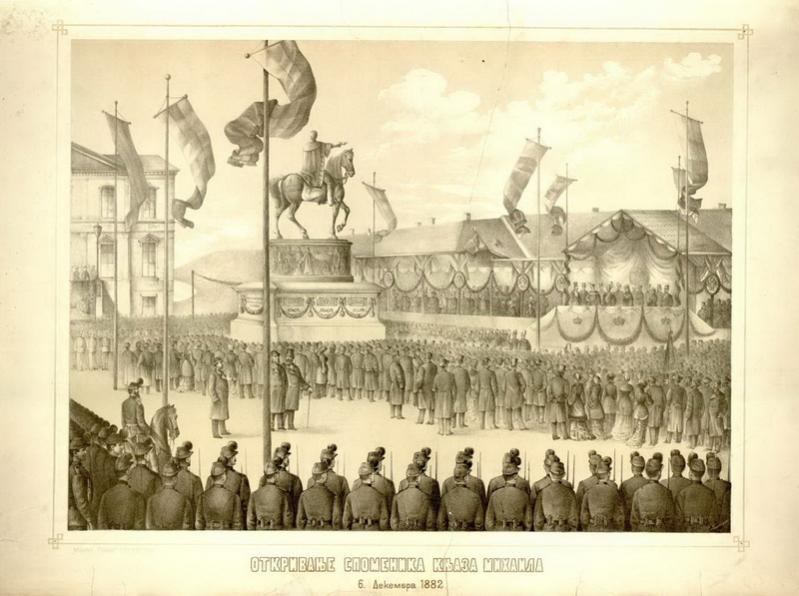
A lithograph depicting the opening of the Monument for the public, 1882

Also in 1871, the government opted to build only the monument in the city, which will be "cast from the old cannons". It announced the international design competition. There were three contestants: Stevan Todorović, Vatroslav Donegani from Rijeka and a Prussian sculptor whose name is not preserved. Dissatisfied with the results, the government repeated the competition in 1873. This time, the location for the monument was set at the Theatre Square (modern Republic Square), across the National Theatre in Belgrade, which was built by prince Michael.

In total, 15 works were received, mostly from foreign artists. The commission added the former two works by Todorović and Donegani, lifting the number of proposals to 17. The first prize was awarded to the Viennese sculptor Vincenz Pilz, second to the distinguished Florentine master Enrico Pazzi, while the third was Wegener's fellow citizen Anton Paul Wegener. However, late prince's chamberlain Anastas Jovanović pushed the commission in Pazzi's favor.

Pazzi was born in Florence in 1819. He was a pupil of the famous sculptor Giovanni Sarti and Duperray. He was representative of the Italian verismo. His artistic direction was showing life as it is, with all its glory and despair. Pazzi had become famous for his work on a monument of the Italian writer Dante; it was erected in 1865 in front of the Florentine church of Santa Croce. Pazzi's Mihailo Obrenović sculpture was to depict the ruler on his horse—an innovation in Serbian society at that time. Work began his work on the statue in 1872 and completed it in 1879, with Serbia gaining independence in 1878. The equestrian statue was undertaken in the classic Italian style of a ruler on a horse, having its model in ancient art. It was the first monumental equestrian statue in Serbia.

=== Dedication ===
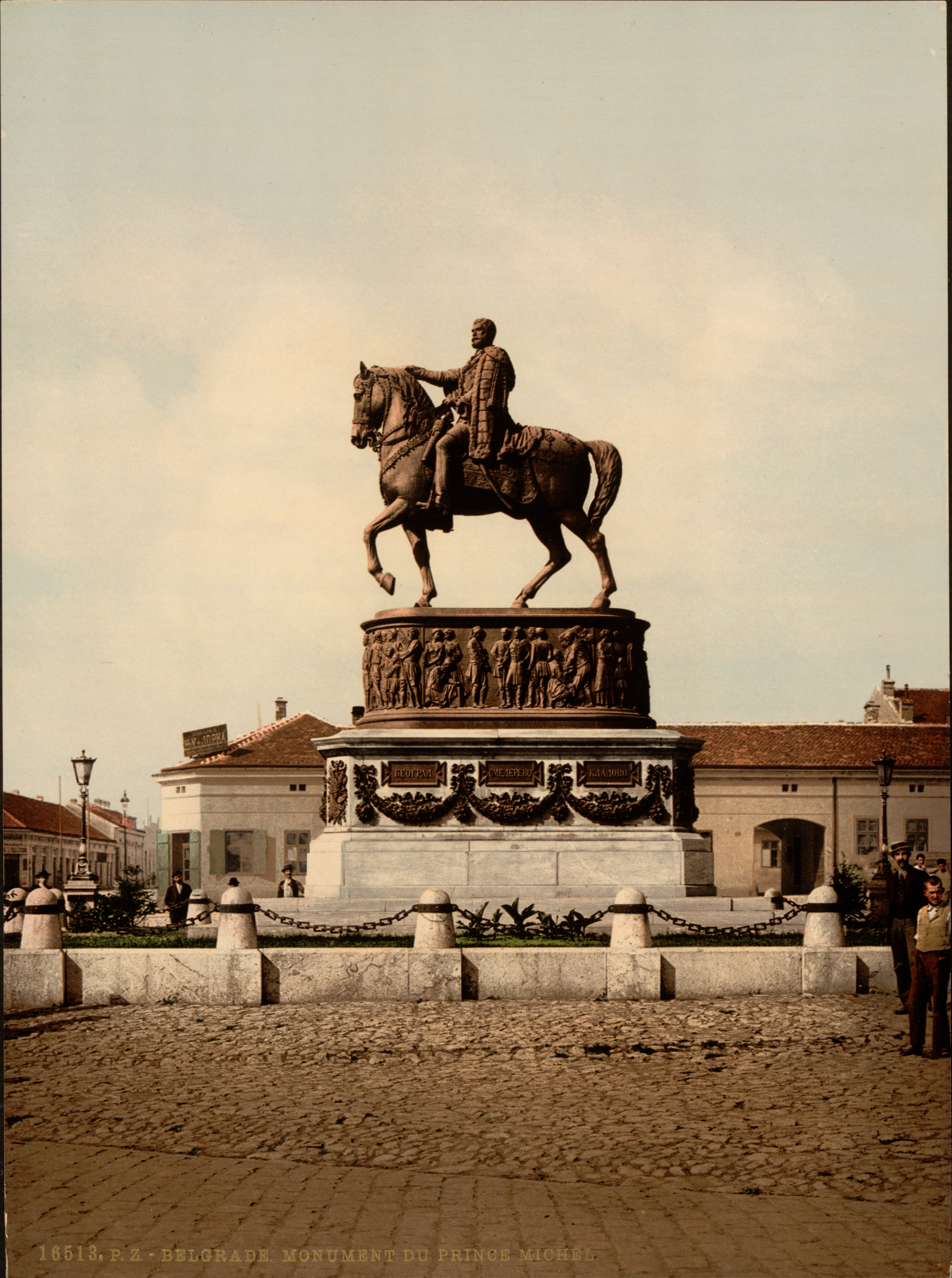
The monument in 1890

The ceremonial unveiling of the monument took place on 18 December [O.S. 6 December] 1882, on the day of Saint Nicholas, patron of the dynasty Obrenovic. The event was conceived as a large ephemeral spectacle on the occasion of the proclamation of the Kingdom of Serbia. At that time, a horseman without a hat was an unusual occurrence, and was noticed by the public. Revealing of Monuments was a great spectacle, On the occasion of its unveiling, stage backdrops decorated with flowers, greenery, heraldic shields with a white double-headed eagles and flags, were set. On this occasion, Enrico Pazzi, as author of one of the most important Serbian monuments of the 19th century, received the Order of the Knight of Takovo, second degree. The ceremony was attended by the highest representatives of church, state and army and large numbers of the populace. Dignitaries included the prime minister Milan Piroćanac and ministers; National assembly's deputies; Dimitrije Nešić, rector of the Great School with its professors; president and members of the Serbian Learned Society; mayor of Belgrade Mihailo Karabiberović and city council members and delegates from throughout Serbia. The monument was unveiled when King Milan and Queen Natalija arrived. The whole event was attended by the press of that time and above all by the "Serbian Newspapers". The ceremony was designed to demonstrate the power of the newly proclaimed Kingdom.

Unveiling of the monument was followed by firing from a hundred and one cannon, and the ringing of bells from all the churches of Belgrade were heard during the ceremonial unveiling of the monument. In front of the monument the Prince was honored and the anthem sung. Journalistic sources say it was a sublime moment of the ceremony. Afterward, there was the laying of silver wreaths of glory.

=== Later developments ===
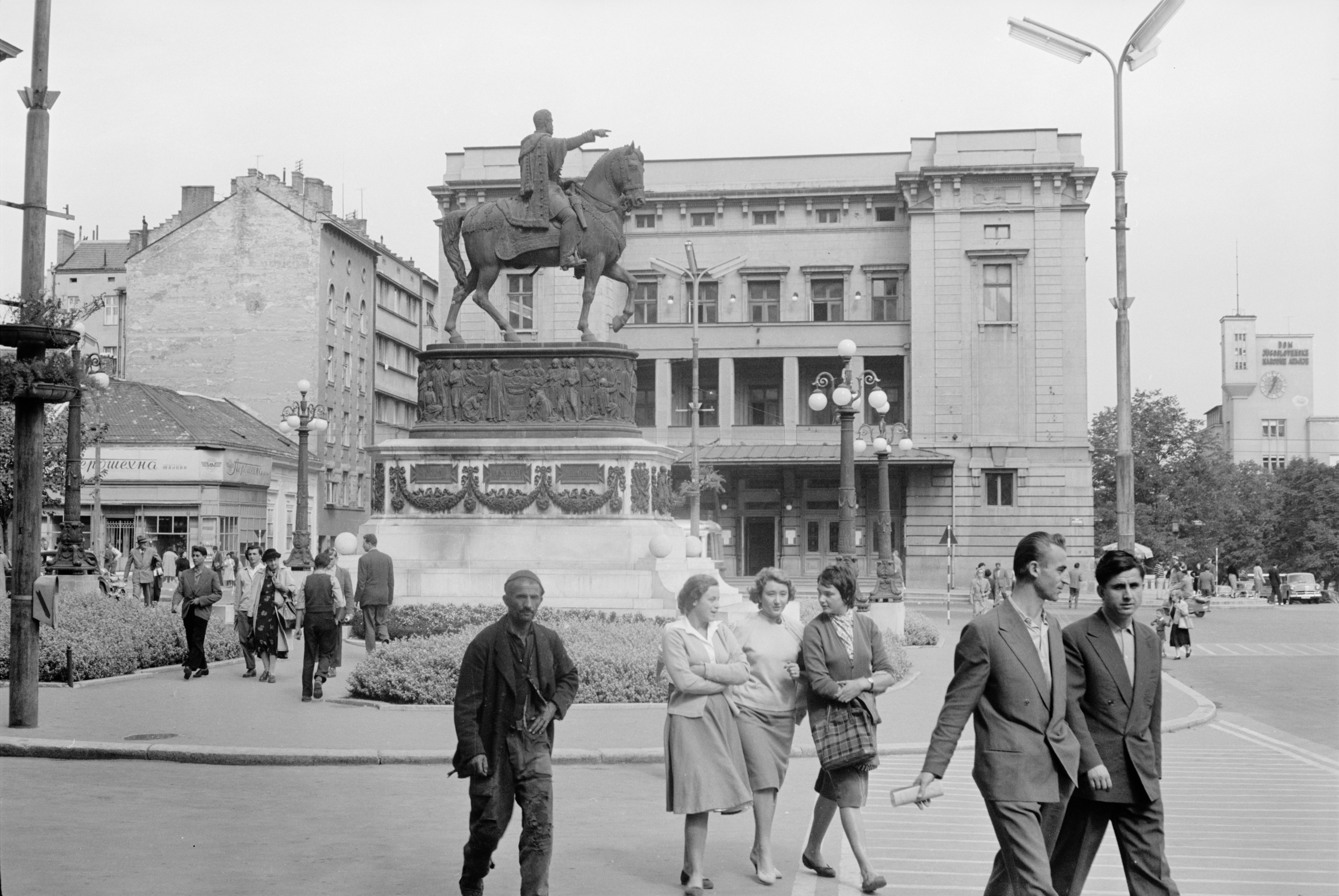
The monument in 1959

Occasionally, architects were suggesting that a protective, decorative fence should be placed around the monument, as the citizens usually sit on the pedestal, which is constantly covered in graffiti. The preservation works were conducted in 1983, and the monument was cleaned thoroughly in 1996, but only the pedestal, while the sculpture wasn't renovated for decades. The pedestal was again cleaned during the 2018-2019 reconstruction of the Republic Square. The reconstruction of the sculpture itself was to start in November 2019. The repairs will be done in situ. The sculpture will be cleaned with distilled water in order to find additional cracks and damages on the brass, which makes most of the material of which the sculpture is built. The patina will be partially cleaned. The large jardinières which surrounded the monument were removed during the square reconstruction, leaving the area around the pedestal, so as the entire square, completely barren.

The repair was then moved to 2 March 2020. In the folded parts of the monument (where hands hold the reins and where the arms, flintlock and sword, are attached), the restorers discovered animal bones - pigs, cows and pigeons. It is believed that they have been piled by the magpies. Bullet holes were discovered on the monument, but were mostly filled up, probably during some of the previous reconstructions. Where patina grew strong, it will not be removed as it protects the bronze. However, on some spots it became so strong that it altered the facial expression and some other parts of the monument. The monument was in good, sturdy shape, is nicely connected to the stone pedestal, with weight perfectly distributed without any visible changes or tilting. A small, drilled hole, presumably also from some previous survey of the monument, was discovered on the horse's right hoof. The casting sand was pouring out of it. The deadline was set for 1 May.

Citing bad weather and the state of emergency due to the COVID-19 pandemic, the works were prolonged for two weeks. Also, the chief conservator-restorer, Risto Mihić, left the project. The elaborate of "Resturatika" company lost the public bidding but was nevertheless selected by the Institute for the Culture Monuments Protection. Mihić, who is also a sculptor, opted for the removal of unstable, weak patina, while he wanted to keep the dark, stable one, claiming it is preserving the monument itself. Chosen project is foreseeing aggressive acidic removal of all patina and sulfuric treatment of the bronze to create new patina. Mihić believed this would harm the sculpture made of several bronze pieces, so he quit and was replaced by Nataša Petrović. The dripstone was added around the pedestal. Works were finished on 10 June 2020, marking the 152nd anniversary of prince's assassination.

== Characteristics ==
=== Design ===
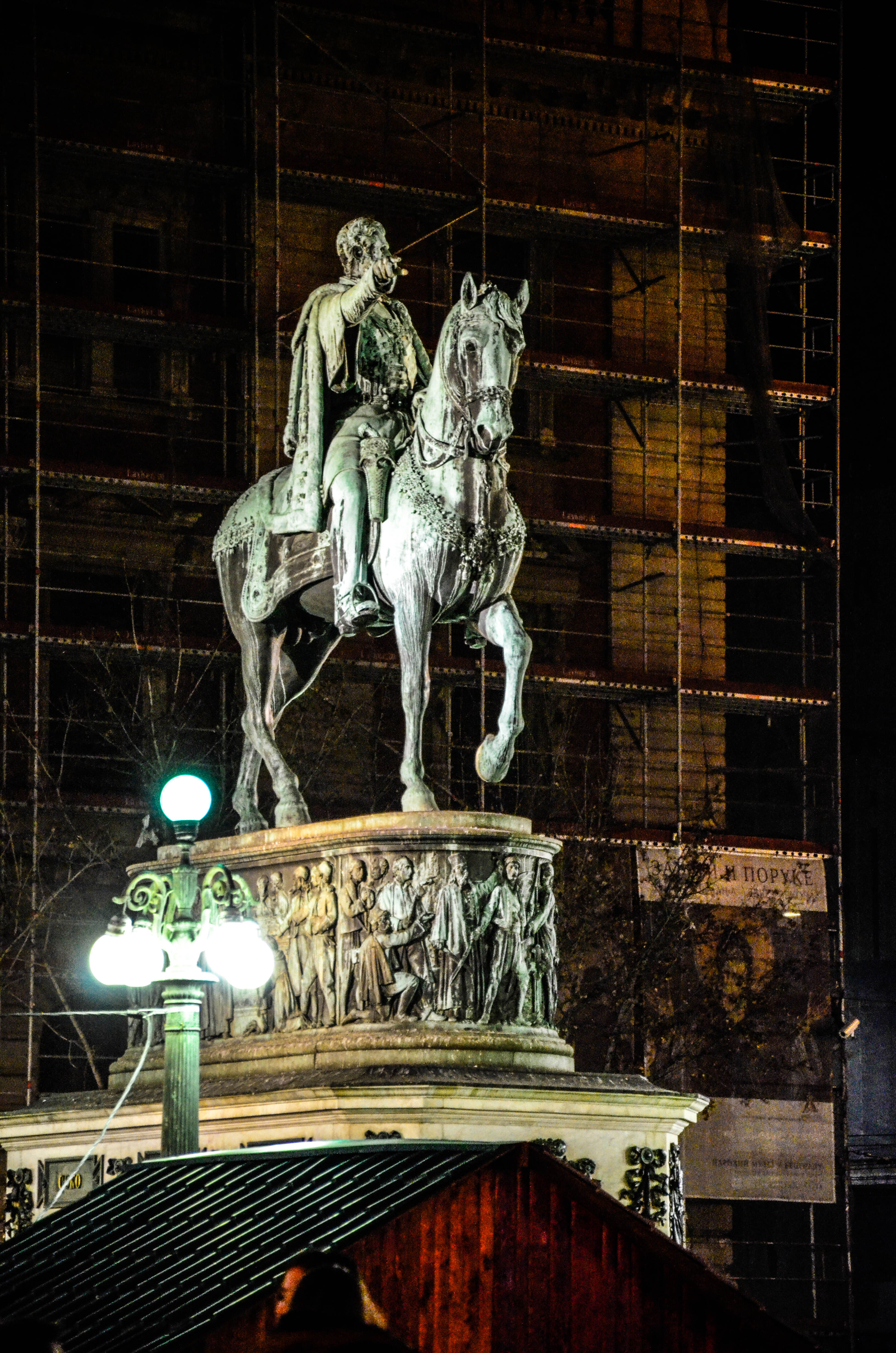
Monument at night

Enrico Pazzi was influenced by two Renaissance monuments from Florence, where he lived: Equestrian Monument of Cosimo I and Equestrian Monument of Ferdinando I. Both were designed by Giambologna with the former being built in 1594 on the Piazza della Signoria, while the later was erected in 1608 on the Piazza della Santissima Annunziata. Both are, however, influenced by the most famous surviving Roman equestrian statue, Equestrian Statue of Marcus Aurelius, sculptured in c175, which became the blueprint for representations of heroes and winners (Justinian, Gattamelata, Henry IV, Peter the Great).

The representation is the mix of Greek and Roman elements. As the ruler and winner on a horse, the prince is represented in Greek style, but the postures of his head, arms and leg, frozen in moment, are typically Roman. The prince's arms are the main representation of his power: the left one has a firm grip on the reins (representing power to control and rule the society), while the right one with extended index finger calls his subjects into future military and diplomatic battles.

Model for the horse figure was an actual horse rode by Prince Michael. It was a black horse received by prince while he was returning with Princess Júlia from their honeymoon in Romania.

=== Description ===
The monument is 11 m (36 ft) (of which the statue itself is 5 m (16 ft)) high and 8.46 m (27.8 ft) long. It was cast in the Ferdinand von Mueller's Royal Bavarian Foundry in Munich, Germany and cost 300,000 dinars. It remains unknown whether the old cannons were really melted and recast.

The monument is a bronze, equestrian statue of Prince Mihailo on the horse. It was erected in honor of the Prince's most important political achievement - a complete expulsion of the Turks from Serbia in 1867 and liberation of the remaining seven Ottoman-held cities within Serbian territory. The names of the cities are carved on plates on the statue's octagonal granite pedestal, and with the Prince's hand pointing to Old Serbia, the remaining non-liberated territory.

The monument is composed of three parts: the plinth, the pedestal and the equestrian statue. The bronze figure represents the prince on the horse, the Serbian liberator from the Turks, whose outstretched arm points to yet oppressed areas. The raised arm, with outstretched index finger comes from militaristic corporeal rhetoric dating back to Roman tradition; in particular used later from French neoclassical art. For Prince Mihailo this gesture meant victory in the field of diplomacy, not on the battlefield. The Prince holds the reins with the left hand—the gesture symbolizing the ability of the ruler to control and manage. Prince Mihailo was presented as the savior of the nation who sacrificed himself for the nation's ideals. The pedestal, made from the Venčac marble, is the oval type with a relief frieze. The representations on the front and rear frieze are taken from the circle of dynastic mythology that celebrates antiquity and heroism of the Serbian people and their renewal under the Obrenović dynasty. The pedestal has been described as the "fine ellipse of marble and bronze, elegant, which symbiotically fused with the figure of the horseman".

The scene of the "Serbian Gusle Player" is on the back north side, surrounded by people dressed in different costumes, which points to different ethnic boundaries of the nation, far beyond the political borders that existed in the period of the Principality of that time. The player is telling sons about the exploits of the Obenović dynasty. There is a representation of another gusle player, mourning above the casket of Prince Michael. On the front south side is the representation "The Prince Milos in Takovo" pointing to the idea of dynastic and national continuity, and to the idea of war for the liberation of homeland.

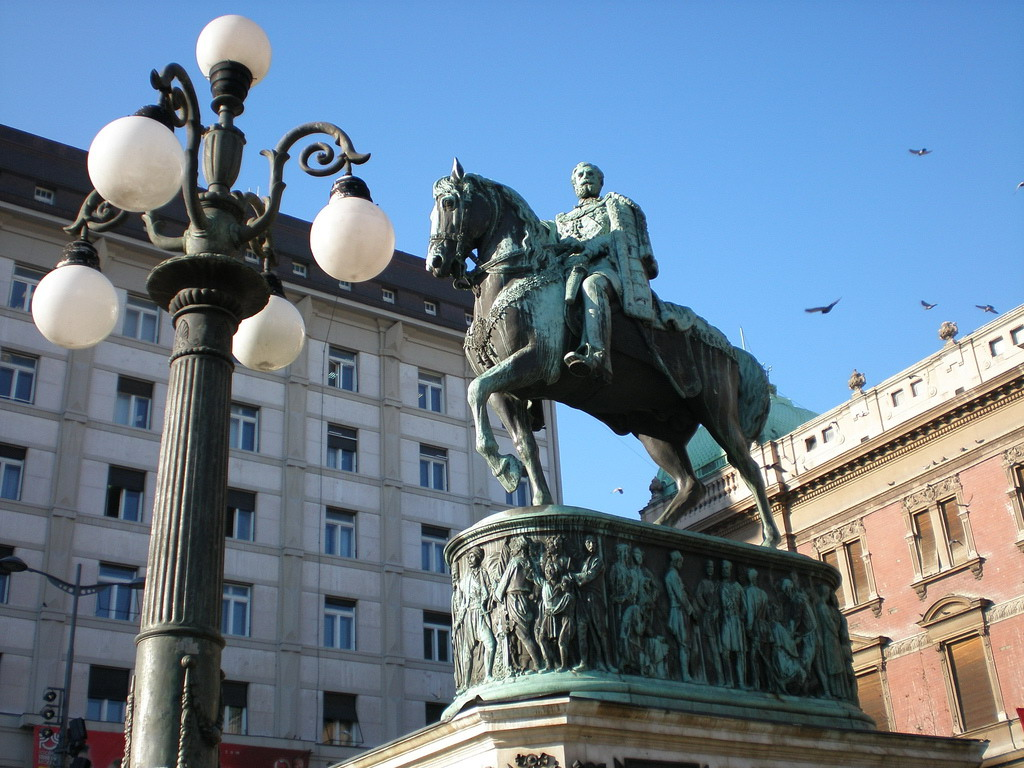
Monument in the main Republic Square

On the east and west side of the monument are reliefs which glorify Prince Mihailo. On the east side is the "National Deputation in front of the Grand Duke Mihailo," based on the idea of restoration of the golden period in the restored state and on the west side is the representation "The Serbs take an oath over the grave of Prince Mihailo". In the middle of the scene there is an ancient sarcophagus with an inscription in French, which says: "Michel III prince de Serbie". The entire pedestal with reliefs was set on a high rectangular plinth, so that the monument's location and appearance would dominate the space; in the assessment, an important visual and symbolic role is made in the elevation of the royal personage.

The emblem of Obrenović dynasty is on the front south side of the plinth, similar to the emblem on the Duke's tomb in the Orthodox Cathedral. Three large bronze garlands are on the lateral sides, on which were inscribed in gilt letters the names of cities liberated in 1867: Belgrade, Kladovo, Soko, Smederevo, Šabac and Užice. On the back, north side is the text (in translation): “To Prince Mihailo Obrenovic III. Grateful Serbia.“ In the corners of the plinth are placed four relief trophies, and around the monument, there is a fence with candelabras.

The Monument to Prince Mihailo was established as a cultural monument of great value, Decision on Establishment, "Off . Gaz. SRS" No.14/79.

== Popularity ==
Prince Mihailo is presented without any kind of hat on his head, which was highly unorthodox for any dignitary, let alone a ruler at the time. Popular story about this survived for a long time. It was about a boy, who on the day of dedication yelled "where is his hat?". The sculptor was so hurt by this, that he committed suicide. In truth, Pazzi lived for another 17 years, to the age of 81. He lived in Belgrade for several years and, upon leaving, wrote an open letter to "chivalric kingdom" of Serbia, stating: "I'm Italian in my soul and emotions, but in my heart and rejoice I'm Serbian".

Though always highly regarded as a ruler, the role and honor of prince somewhat fell into the oblivion when it comes to his monument, and the statue became simply known as kod konja (Serbian for "at the horse"). Even the nearby restaurant was named that way for a while. It became the most popular gathering place in Belgrade, as people would just say "lets meet at the horse". Art historians partially blame the composition of the monument itself for this, as the statute is clearly "more forcing the horse than the horseman". Other chroniclers and journalists don't understand why the first association for the citizens is the horse and not the prince, but that it likely won't change soon as the habit of calling it "at the horse" now spans many generations.

== See also ==
- Monuments of Culture of Great Importance
- Tourism in Serbia
