= Aromanians in Serbia =

Ethnic group in Serbia

Armãnji tu Sãrghii Аромуни у Србији

Total population
- 327 (2022) 5,000–15,000 (est.)

Regions with significant populations
- Belgrade, Knjaževac, Niš, Pančevo, Smederevo

Languages
- Aromanian and Serbian

Religion
- Eastern Orthodoxy

Related ethnic groups
- Aromanians

The Aromanians in Serbia (Aromanian: armãnji or rrãmãnji; Serbian: Аромуни, romanized: Aromuni or Армани, Armani), most commonly known as "Tsintsars" (Serbian: Цинцари, romanized: Cincari) and sometimes as "Vlachs" (Serbian: Власи, romanized: Vlasi), are a non-recognized Aromanian ethnic minority in Serbia.

== History ==
Historically, the Aromanians were an isolated group who focused on preserving their culture, language, and identity and on nomadic pastoralism. However, from the second half of the 20th century, the Serbian Aromanians began to put aside this practice and migrated to the cities, where they would be subject to assimilation.

Many Aromanians came to Serbia after leaving Moscopole, in present-day Albania. This city had been the economic and cultural center of the Aromanians for years, even becoming the second biggest city of the Ottoman Empire, but it was plundered and destroyed in the mid-18th century. Many former inhabitants of this city went north, reaching various European cities, including some in modern Serbia such as Belgrade, Novi Sad, and Zemun. Upon arriving, the Aromanians started being called Tsintsars by the Serbs, name that they ended up adopting and the one that they insist that it be used to refer to them today. Today, the Aromanians in Serbia do not conform compact communities anywhere in the country and live scattered throughout it, living mostly in cities such as in Knjaževac, Pančevo, Smederevo and, especially, Belgrade and Niš.

== Demographics ==
There are an estimated 5,000, 10,000, or 15,000 Aromanians living in Serbia, despite the fact that only 243 people declared themselves ethnic "Tsintsar" (Aromanian) in the 2011 census. This is why the Aromanians have not been recognized as a national minority of Serbia yet, as the minimum number of people a minority has to have to be declared as such must be 300. They reached this threshold in the 2022 census, in which 327 persons declared Aromanian ethnicity.

== Culture ==
There is a cultural organization known as the Lunjina Serbian–Aromanian Association with the aim of preserving the Aromanian minority in Serbia and its customs, culture, language, name and traditions.

== Notable people ==
People in Serbia who were Aromanians or of Aromanian descent:

- Members of the Mocioni family
- Dimitrije Bodi (1850–1942), journalist and diplomat
- Cincar-Marko (1777–1822), aristocrat and diplomat
- Jovan Deroko (1912–1941), military officer
- Dragutin Dimitrijević (1876–1917), military officer and conspirator
- Vladan Đorđević (1844–1930), physician, politician and diplomat
- Toma Fila (born 1941), lawyer and politician
- Petar Ičko (1755–1808), merchant and diplomat
- Cincar-Janko (1779–1833), military leader
- Vladeta Janković (born 1940), university professor, diplomat and politician
- Jovan Jovanović Zmaj (1833–1904), poet, translator and physician
- Jovan Karamata (1902–1967), mathematician and university professor
- Taško Načić (1934–1993), actor
- Branislav Nušić (1864–1938), writer
- Lazar Paču (1855–1915), physician and politician
- Fanula Papazoglu (1917–2001), scholar, epigrapher and academic
- Mihailo Polit-Desančić (1833–1920), politician, journalist and writer
- Dušan J. Popović (1894–1985), historian and professor
- Georgios Sinas (1783–1856), entrepreneur and banker

== See also ==
- Aromanians in Albania
- Aromanians in Bulgaria
- Aromanians in Greece
- Aromanians in North Macedonia
- Aromanians in Romania
- Zlatno runo
