= Megleno-Romanian =

Megleno-Romanian may refer to:

- Megleno-Romanians, an ethnic group native to the Balkans
- Megleno-Romanian language, the language of this ethnicity, part of the Eastern Romance family
