= Notia =

Village in Macedonia, Greece

Nótia Νότια Nânti, Nânta
- Community
- Location within Greece
- Coordinates: 41°06′11″N 22°12′36″E
- Country: Greece
- Geographic region: Macedonia
- Administrative region: Central Macedonia
- Regional unit: Pella
- Municipality: Almopia
- Municipal unit: Exaplatanos

Area
  - Community: 106.481 km^{2} (41.113 sq mi)
- Elevation: 595 m (1,952 ft)

Population (2021)
  - Community: 295
  - Density: 2.77/km^{2} (7.18/sq mi)
- Time zone: UTC+2 (EET)
  - Summer (DST): UTC+3 (EEST)

Nótia (Greek: Νότια, formerly Νώτια; Megleno Romanian: Nânti or Nânta; Macedonian: Ноти) is a village in the Exaplatanos municipal unit of the Pella regional unit, Macedonia, Greece.

Notia was once the largest Megleno-Romanian village, whose population underwent mass conversion to Islam in the 18th century. In the 1920s, Muslim Megleno-Romanians were deported to Turkey under the terms of the Greco-Turkish population exchange, and the area was settled by Pontic Greek refugees.

== Early history ==
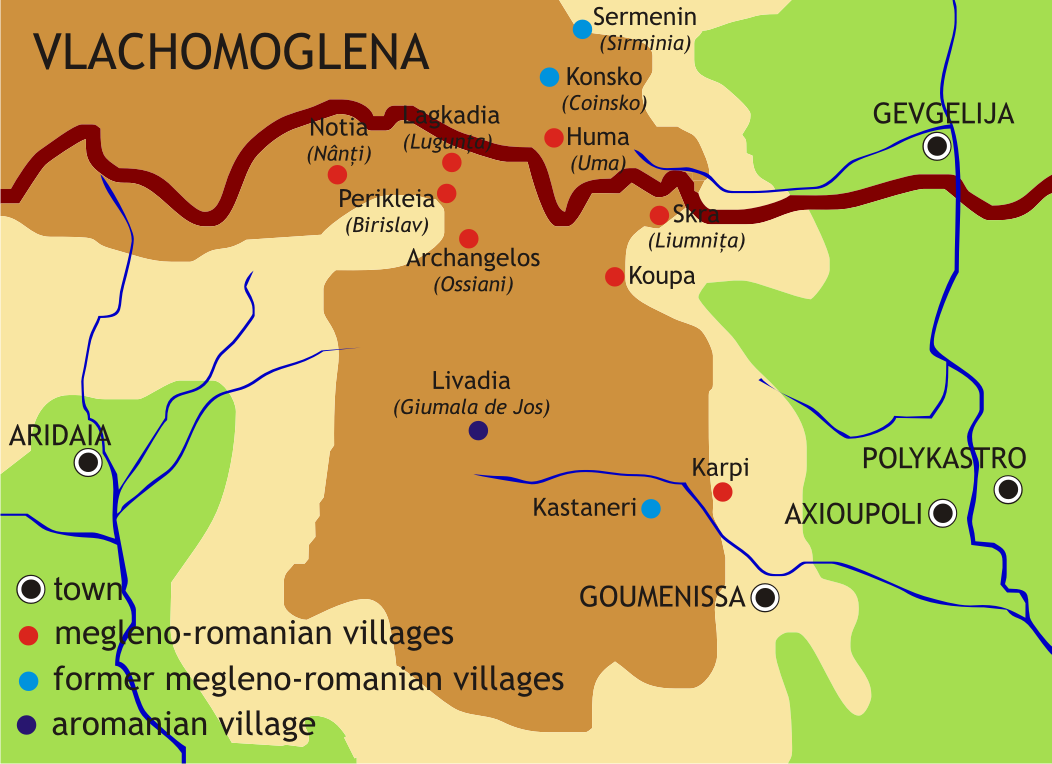
Map of Megleno-Romanians settlements in Greece and North Macedonia

Notia's name derives from the 11th century Byzantine castle of Enotia (the castle's precise location remains unknown). Its name was formerly spelled Νώτια in Greek, while its Megleno-Romanian population called it Nânti or Nânta. Evidence of early settlement of the area of Notia comes from a Roman era funerary statue fragment and a now lost imago clipeata unearthed in its vicinity.

In 1134, Saint Ilarios founded the Monastery of Moglena in the vicinity of Enotia. Following the 14th century Ottoman conquest of central Macedonia, the area was settled by Turkic nomads from Asia Minor. Historically it had been the village with the largest Megleno-Romanian population, and the only one with a regular market. The majority of Notia's population gradually converted to Islam. Various dates have been given for the mass conversion including 1671, 1759 and 1765-1770. Some of the inhabitants refused to convert and instead departed for the surrounding villages. Notias' inhabitants engaged in fruit, pepper and wheat farming, they also raised livestock. Prior to the population exchange Notia's Muslim majority maintained some Christian customs, while a minority were Crypto-Christians. The village once had eight quarters and four mosques which were built on the foundations of churches. At least one of the mosques was later destroyed.

In the second half of the 19th century, Notia's beys converted the neighboring Vlach villages into their chiflik. Oppressing their inhabitants while becoming increasingly prosperous. The beys also abducted women from the surrounding villages and forced them into marriage.

During World War I Notia was situated close to the front line of the Macedonian front. On 17 September 1914, the 8th Regiment of the 4th Greek Division captured Notia and the surrounding defense works after a two hour battle with the Bulgarian Army. The engagement formed part of the Entente breakthrough during the Battle of Dobro Pole.

The 1920s marked a radical demographic shift in the region as the Muslim Megleno-Romanians became the subject of the population exchange between Greece and Turkey, while Pontic Greek refugees arrived from Turkey. Most of the refugees that settled in Notia originated from the villages of Yeniköy and Tsormik from the former Kars Oblast. After fleeing their homes they initially arrived in Thessaloniki. After suffering from malaria they requested to be resettled in an area with few mosquitos and were therefore relocated to Notia between 1921 and 1922. In 1923, the Muslim Megleno-Romanians of the village were deported to Eastern Thrace in Turkey. They were called by the Greeks as "Karadjovalis" and by the Turks (Turkish: Karacaovalılar) after the Turkish name of their home region. They nowadays call themselves as Nantinets. In 1924, more Pontic Greek refugees originating from the villages of Chelva Maten and Akdağmadeni came from Thessaloniki. The first mayor of the village after its resettlement was Ioannis Giatagatzidis. Between 1926 and 1935, Megleno-Romanians who had espoused a pro-Romanian stance during the Aromanian question crisis immigrated to Southern Dobruja, Romania.

== Modern history ==
During the course of the Axis occupation of Greece many Notians joined the ranks of the 30th Regiment of the ELAS resistance organization. In January 1944, a Bulgarian Army Regiment set out from Gevgelija towards Greece in order to participate in a German counter-insurgency operation. The Bulgarians arrived in Notia on 1 February, most of the residents had abandoned the village after hearing about the massacres committed by the Bulgarians in the wider area. The Bulgarians gathered as many men as they could find in the village square and then led them to a slope outside the village. A firing squad then killed 47 people and injured 11 more. The Axis troops then burned 80 houses. A memorial honoring the victims of the massacre was erected in 1982.

Notia also became a scene of fighting during the Greek Civil War. At 6:30 a.m. on 17 November 1946, 150 fighters belonging to the communist Democratic Army of Greece (DSE) attacked the garrison of Notia with the aid of local sympathizers. The 20 man platoon of the 3rd Company of the 565th Battalion of the national army defended its position until midday, whereupon DSE took over the village. The nationalists suffered 15 dead in the engagement, three wounded and two more soldiers managed to escape from the village. Upon seizing the village the communists executed two wounded soldiers and the mayor of the village, subsequently razing his house. An attempt by the nationalists to send reinforcements from Archangelos was thwarted and the government forces retreated to their initial positions.

In fieldwork done by anthropologist Riki Van Boeschoten in late 1993, Notia was populated by a Greek population descended from Anatolian Greek refugees who arrived during the Greek-Turkish population exchange, and Vlachs. Pontic Greek was spoken in the village by people over 30 in public and private settings. Children understood the language, but mostly did not use it. The Vlach language was spoken in the village by people over 30 in public and private settings. Children understood the language, but mostly did not use it. In the early twenty-first century, Notia is populated by a Pontic Greek majority population, as well as smaller numbers of Christian Vlachs (Megleno-Romanians) who had moved there from Archangelos and Perikleia and a few Sarakatsani who arrived in the 1950s.

In 2000, the residents of the village founded the Cultural Association of Notia Μορφωτικός Σύλλογος Νότιας cultural center where Pontic Greek musical instruments folk dances are taught. The association organizes an annual potato festival in October (potato production is a key industry of Notia), along with celebrations of Dormition of the Mother of God on 15 August.

== Demographics ==
Historical Population
Date	Population
1900	c. 3,500
1913	3,442
1920	1,607
1928	712
1940	1,512
1951	95
1961	437
1971	440
1981	412
1991	367
2001	388
2011	306
2021	295
