= Românul de la Pind =

Aromanian Romanian-language newspaper

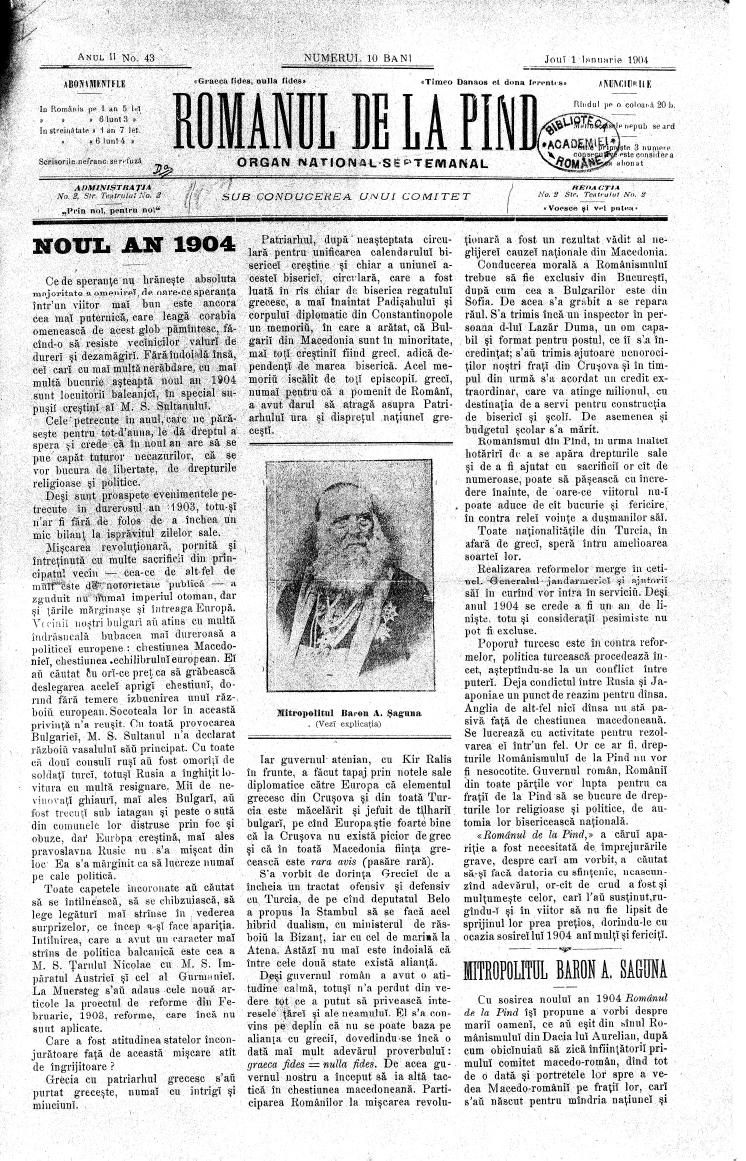
- Issue 43 from 1 January 1904 of Românul de la Pind, featuring a portrait of Andrei Șaguna
- Type: Weekly newspaper
- Founder: Nicolae Constantin Batzaria
- Founded: 26 May 1903
- Ceased publication: 25 November 1912
- Political alignment: Romanian nationalism, Aromanian minority rights
- Language: Romanian
- Headquarters: Bucharest

Românul de la Pind ("The Romanian of the Pindus" in Romanian) was a Romanian weekly newspaper. It was founded on 26 May 1903 in Bucharest, Romania, by the Aromanian cultural activist Nicolae Constantin Batzaria, who was the director of the newspaper, in collaboration with several other Aromanian colleagues in the Ottoman Empire. Early issues of the newspaper carried the name Reforme ("Reforms" in Romanian), and were under the authorship of an anonymous committee. During this time, editors called for measures and reforms to take place for the protection of the supposedly Romanian minorities south of the Danube. As of issue 12, the newspaper began to be titled Românul de la Pind, revealing being led by intellectuals from the Ottoman Empire. In 1904, editors of the newspaper began to sign their articles, these including Batzaria himself, Aromanian writers Marcu Beza and Nicolae Velo and Aromanian schoolteacher Ion D. Arginteanu. Other editors of the newspaper throughout its existence were the Aromanian poet and author of the Aromanian anthem Constantin Belimace and the Megleno-Romanian editor and professor Constantin Noe. In 1906, Revista Macedoniei ("Macedonia's Magazine"), newspaper in circulation from 25 September 1905 to 17 September 1906, was merged into Românul de la Pind. Revista Macedoniei was a weekly newspaper operated by the Macedo-Romanian Cultural Society. For a time, N. C. Furca succeeded Batzaria as the director of Românul de la Pind. The newspaper ceased its publications on 25 November 1912 with the First Balkan War. It was the longest-running newspaper by and about Aromanians until the times of World War II.

Of nationalist character, Românul de la Pind claimed to be "for Romanians on the right side of the Danube", referring to the Aromanians and other groups, which the newspaper considered ethnic Romanian. It was a mostly political newspaper, permanently focused on the issue of the minority rights of the Aromanians and on the violent interethnic conflicts in the Balkans. Românul de la Pind had a markedly anti-Greek attitude, and it had conflicts with several Greek publications. It condemned Greek actions against Aromanian institutions in Malovište (Mulovishti), referring to the Greeks as a "perfidious" and "inhumane" enemy. The newspaper used for a time the famous motto Timeo Danaos et dona ferentes ("Beware of Greeks bearing gifts"), although it was changed to Prin noi, pentru noi ("From us, for us") in its last years.

Românul de la Pind was not subsidized by the Romanian state, so it was funded through subscriptions. If a person bought three consecutive issues, they were considered subscribed to the newspaper. Some publications appeared in English and French so as to spread knowledge about the Aromanian question throughout Europe.
