= Constantin Noe =

Megleno-Romanian editor and professor in Romania

- Born: 1883; Lagkadia, Ottoman Empire (modern Greece)
- Died: 6 June 1939 (aged 55–56); Bucharest, Romania
- Education: Romanian High School of Bitola; University of Bucharest
- Occupations: Editor, professor

Constantin Noe (1883 – 6 June 1939) was a Megleno-Romanian editor and professor. He was born in 1883 in the Megleno-Romanian village of Lagkadia (Lundzini in Megleno-Romanian), then in the Ottoman Empire and now in Greece. He was one of the best students of the Romanian High School of Bitola, from which he graduated in 1903. On the same year, Noe became professor in several of the Romanian schools in the Balkans and one of the main figures of the Megleno-Romanian national movement. In 1907, he and several others of his colleagues were arrested and sentenced to four months in prison under the pretext of not using books approved by the General Directorate of Education of the Salonica vilayet of the Ottoman Empire in the schools they were teaching at.

After being released, Noe migrated to Romania and became secretary of the National Museum of Antiquities in Bucharest from 1907 to 1911. During his stay in Bucharest, he was editor of the newspaper Românul de la Pind ("The Romanian of the Pindus") for almost two years. In 1909, Noe received a scholarship from the Faculty of Letters of the University of Bucharest, graduating four years later with a degree in geography and history. In 1913, the League for the Cultural Unity of All Romanians published his French-language memorial Les Roumains Koutzo-Valaques. Les populations macedoniennes et la crise balkanique ("The Kutso-Vlach Romanians. The Macedonian Populations and the Balkan Crisis"), in which he advocated the establishment of an Albanian–"Romanian" (the latter referring to the Aromanians) independent state in the Balkans on the federal model of Switzerland.

In 1913, Noe fought in the Second Balkan War as part of the 7th Vânători Regiment of the Romanian Land Forces. For this, he received the Avântul Țării Medal. Afterwards, he migrated to Transylvania, then under Austria-Hungary, where he associated himself with important figures of the Romanian national movement of the region such as Ștefan Cicio Pop and Vasile Goldiș, among others. In Transylvania, Noe collaborated in the newspapers Românul ("The Romanian") in Arad and Transilvania ("Transylvania") in Sibiu, becoming in 1916 editor for the French-language Journal des Balkans. Noe then emigrated to Chișinău in Bessarabia, then under the Moldavian Democratic Republic, in 1918; Noe was among the editors of the first issue of the newspaper România Nouă ("New Romania"), being also the editorial secretary of the daily Sfatul Țării ("Council of the Country"). Later in 1918, Bessarabia united with Romania, and Noe was given the Manhood and Faith Medal for his pro-union and anti-Bolshevik efforts. On 10 July 1919, Noe, together with Epaminonda Balamace and Gheorghe Mecu, founded the Glasul Țarii ("Voice of the Country") bookstore and publishing house, and on 1 November 1920, he founded the daily Dreptatea ("Righteousness"), which he directed along Hr. Dăscălescu.

Noe returned to Bucharest in 1924, becoming professor in the Gheorghe Lazăr National College, the Spiru Haret National College, the Saint Sava National College and the Mihai Eminescu National College, being transferred in 1929 to be professor in the Mihai Viteazul National College. In the latter, he was appointed permanently in 1931, and Noe performed his activities in the high school until 6 June 1939, when he died.

Noe was an important figure in the ambit of the Aromanians and Megleno-Romanians. He was the president of the Meglenia Cultural Society and secretary of the Macedo-Romanian Cultural Society. Noe played a key role in the migration to Romania of Megleno-Romanians and also of Aromanians from villages nearby to the Megleno-Romanian settlements that took place mainly between 1923 and 1925. This was as a consequence of the various wars (the Balkan Wars and World War I) that ravaged the area and of the conquest of the Megleno-Romanian villages by states hostile to the Megleno-Romanian national movement, such as Greece.
