= Sermenin =

Village in North Macedonia

Sermenin Серменин
- Village
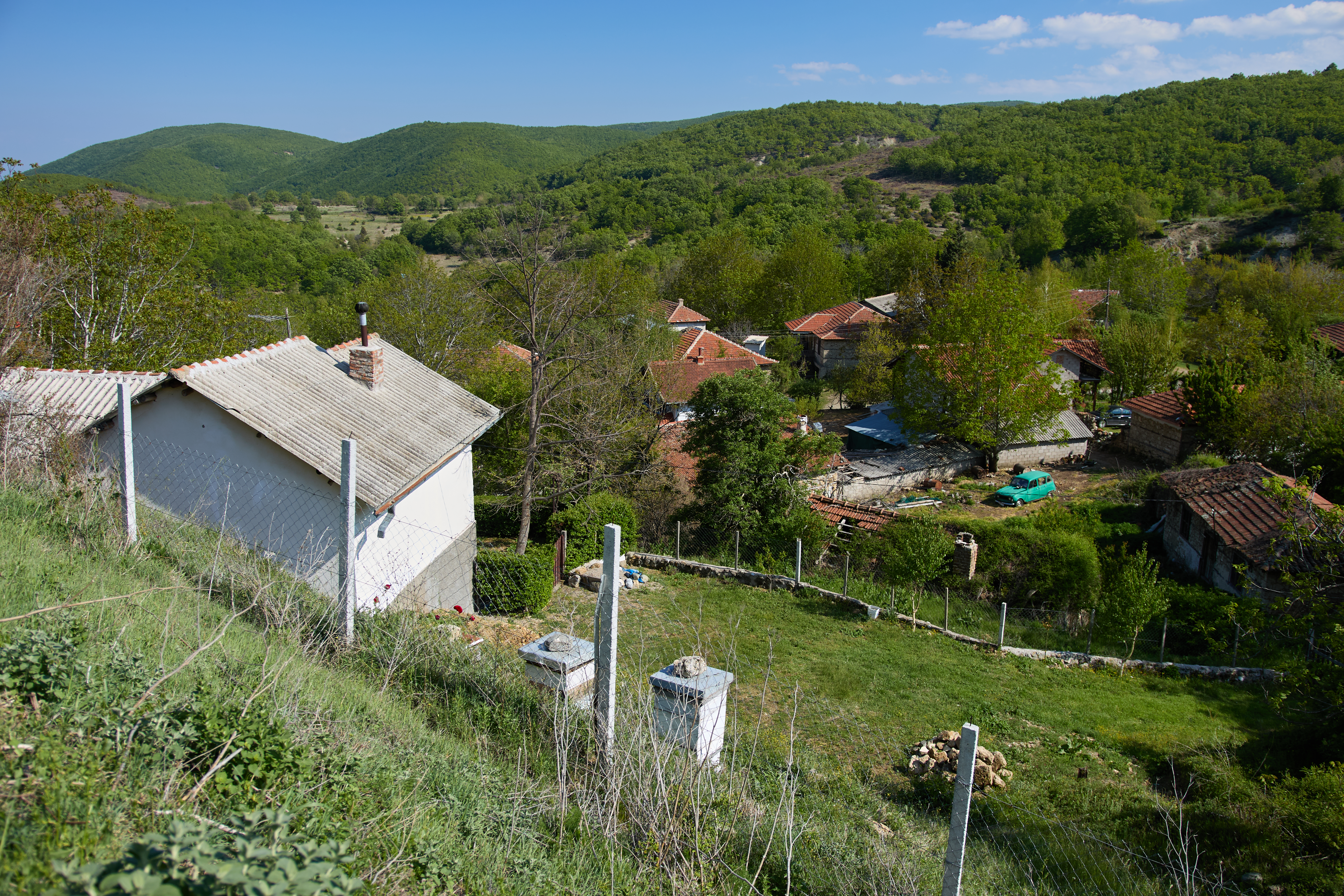
- View of the village

- Location within North Macedonia
- Coordinates: 41°13′11″N 22°20′48″E
- Country: North Macedonia
- Region: Southeastern
- Municipality: Gevgelija

Population (2021)
  - Total: 8
- Time zone: UTC+1 (CET)
  - Summer (DST): UTC+2 (CEST)

Sermenin (Macedonian: Серменин; Megleno Romanian: Sirminină or Sirminina) is a village located in the Gevgelija Municipality of North Macedonia. As of the 2021 census, it had a population of 8.

== Demographics ==
According to the 2002 census, Sermenin had a total of 18 inhabitants. Ethnic groups in the village included:

- Macedonians 16
- Serbs 2

As of the 2021 census, the village had 8 residents with the following ethnic composition:

- Macedonians 8

Sermenin was once a Megleno-Romanian village, but together with Konsko (Coinsco or Conițca), it underwent significant Slavicisation and, by the end of the 19th century, Megleno-Romanian was no longer spoken in either village, with Huma (Umă or Uma) remaining as the sole Megleno-Romanian village in modern North Macedonia.

== Notable people ==
- Vančo Prke (1921–1943), Macedonian World War II communist partisan
