= Konsko =

Village in North Macedonia

Konsko Конско
- Village
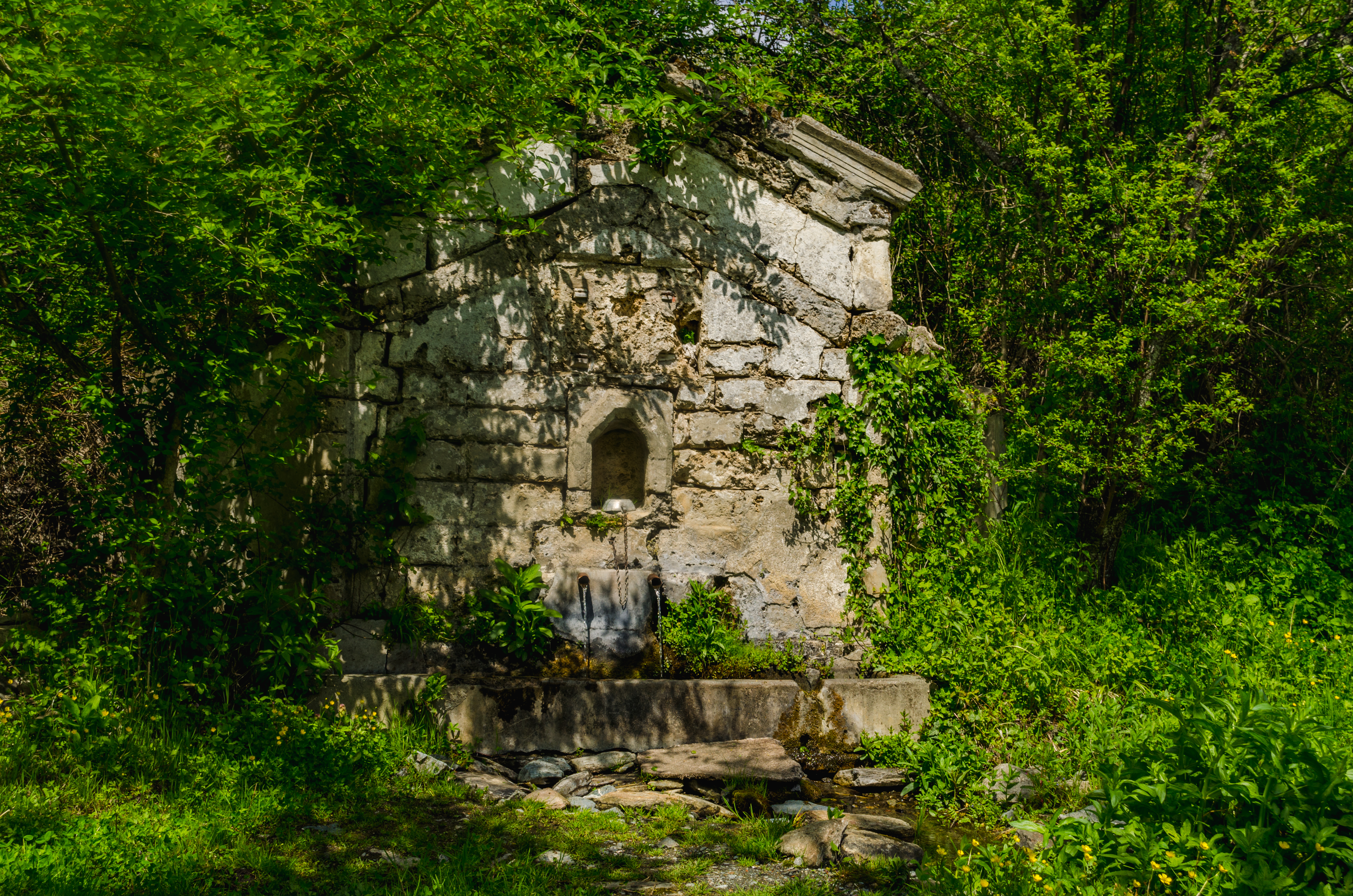
- Old fountain at the village

- Location within North Macedonia
- Coordinates: 41.186450°N 22.319671°E
- Country: North Macedonia
- Region: Southeastern
- Municipality: Gevgelija

Population (2021)
  - Total: 11
- Time zone: UTC+1 (CET)
  - Summer (DST): UTC+2 (CEST)
- Website: .

Konsko (Macedonian: Конско; Megleno Romanian: Coinsco or Conițca) is a village located in the Gevgelija Municipality of North Macedonia. As of the 2002 census it had a population of 4.

== Demographics ==
As of the 2021 census, Konsko had 11 residents with the following ethnic composition:

- Macedonians 10
- Persons for whom data are taken from administrative sources 1

According to the 2002 census, the village had a total of 4 inhabitants. Ethnic groups in the village include:

- Macedonians 4

Konsko was once a Megleno-Romanian village, but together with Sermenin (Sirminină or Sirminina), it underwent significant Slavicisation and, by the end of the 19th century, Megleno-Romanian was no longer spoken in either village, with Huma (Umă or Uma) remaining as the sole Megleno-Romanian village in modern North Macedonia.
