= Dumitru Ciotti =

Megleno-Romanian activist, editor and schoolteacher

- Born: 1882 or 26 October 1885; Skra, Ottoman Empire
- Died: 1974 (aged 91–92 or 88–89); Constanța, Romania
- Occupations: Activist, editor, schoolteacher

Dumitru Ciotti (1882 or 26 October 1885 – 1974) was a Megleno-Romanian activist, editor and schoolteacher. Ciotti was born in the Megleno-Romanian village of Skra (Liumnița in Megleno-Romanian), then in the Ottoman Empire and now in Greece. His date of birth was in either 1882 or 26 October 1885, sources vary on this. From his youth, Ciotti showed interest in the national cause of the Megleno-Romanians. In 1904, he graduated from the Commercial Lyceum of Thessaloniki, after which he was appointed teacher at the Romanian school in Skra. In 1908, during the Young Turk Revolution of the Ottoman Empire, Ciotti was one of the Megleno-Romanians who was on the side of the Young Turks.

In 1915, Ciotti migrated to Bucharest, Romania, where he would live for a while. During his stay in the city, he published articles for the Romanian newspapers Acțiunea ("The Action"), Adevărul ("The Truth"), Dimineața ("The Morning") and Moldova ("Moldavia"). Ciotti strongly supported the migration of Megleno-Romanians into Romania that took place mainly between 1923 and 1925. This migration was due to the various conflicts (the Balkan Wars and World War I) that ravaged the area and to the conquest of the Megleno-Romanian villages by states hostile to the Megleno-Romanian national movement, such as Greece. Some Aromanians from villages close to the Megleno-Romanian settlements also participated on it. Ciotti was also a member of the Meglenia Cultural Society.

In 1927, Ciotti founded the newspaper Românul ("The Romanian") in Silistra, of which he was the director. This newspaper was informative but also propagandistic, and had several articles analyzing the settlement process of Romanians in Southern Dobruja. He was later mayor of the commune of Cerna from 1941 to 1942, after which he moved to Constanța, where he lived until his death in 1974.
