= Vančo Prke =

Macedonian partisan during WW2

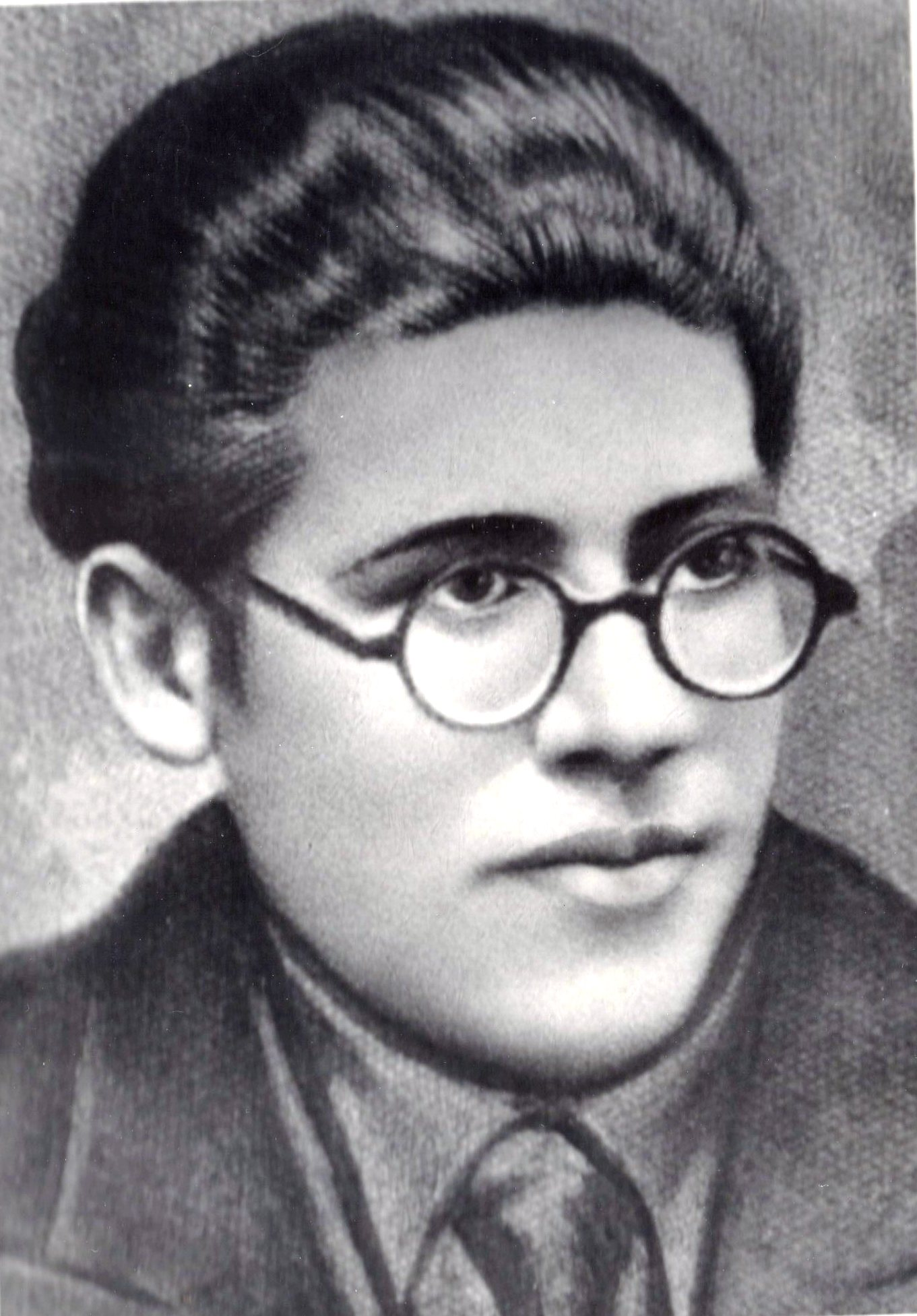
- Born: Vančo Prke-Sermen; 1921; Sermenin, Kingdom of Yugoslavia
- Died: 13 May 1943 (aged 22-23); Gradec, Kingdom of Bulgaria

Vančo Prke-Sermen (Macedonian: Ванчо Прке) (c.1921 – 13 of May 1943) was a Macedonian communist and partisan fighter during World War II. He is recognized as a People’s Hero of Yugoslavia for his contributions during the war.

== Life ==
Prke was born in 1921 in the village of Sermenin, near Gevgelija, in what was then the Kingdom of Yugoslavia. Raised in poverty by a widowed mother, he was sent to live with another family in Štip, where he completed his secondary education. In 1939, he enrolled at the Technical Faculty in Belgrade. While studying, he joined the Communist Party of Yugoslavia (KPJ) in 1940 and worked as a translator of Russian literature for the publishing house “Nolit.”

Following the Axis invasion of Yugoslavia in 1941, Prke moved to Bulgarian occupation zone of Yugoslavia and became actively involved in organizing resistance efforts in the Štip region. By 1943, he was a member of the Regional Committee of Communists in Macedonia and served as the political commissar of the Bitola-Prespa partisan detachment. Later that year, he was appointed political commissar of the newly formed Plachkovica partisan detachment.

== Death ==
On 19 May 1943, he and a group of partisans headed toward the Plachkovica mountain. On 21 May, while resting in a hut near the village of Gradec, they were surrounded by Bulgarian police forces. Only Prke was armed, and he ordered the others to retreat while he held off the enemy. After running out of ammunition, he was killed by machine-gun fire.

== Legacy ==
His legacy endures in North Macedonia, with various institutions with his name, such as the “Vančo Prke” elementary school in Shtip and the “Vančo Prke” Library in Vinica named in his honor.
