= Petar Atanasov =

Petar Atanasov may refer to:

- Petar Atanasov (footballer) (born 1990), Bulgarian footballer
- Petar Atanasov (linguist) (born 1939), Macedonian linguist of Megleno-Romanian ethnicity
