= Lagkadia, Pella =

Greek village

Coordinates: 41°06′39″N 22°16′09″E

Lagkadia (Greek: Λαγκάδια; Megleno Romanian: Lugunța or Lundzini; alternate names or transliterations: Lagadia, Langadia, Langadhia, Lunguntsa) is a village located in Greece. It is only a few kilometres from the border of Greece - North Macedonia. It is part of the municipality Almopia.

== Notable people ==
- Constantin Noe (1883–1939), Megleno-Romanian editor and professor in Romania
