= Greeks bearing gifts =

Greeks bearing gifts may refer to:

- The prophecy of Laocoön, priest of Troy, who in Virgil's Aeneid, tells his countrymen to "Beware of Greeks bearing gifts"
- The mythological Trojan Horse which Laocoön foresees
- "looking a Trojan horse in the mouth", the 1982 scene in the British sitcom Yes, Minister
- "Greeks Bearing Gifts", a 1991 episode of Inspector Morse
- "Greeks Bearing Gifts" (Torchwood), a 2006 episode of the science-fiction television programme Torchwood
- Greeks Bearing Gifts, a 2018 novel by Philip Kerr
