= Petar Atanasov (linguist) =

Macedonian linguist

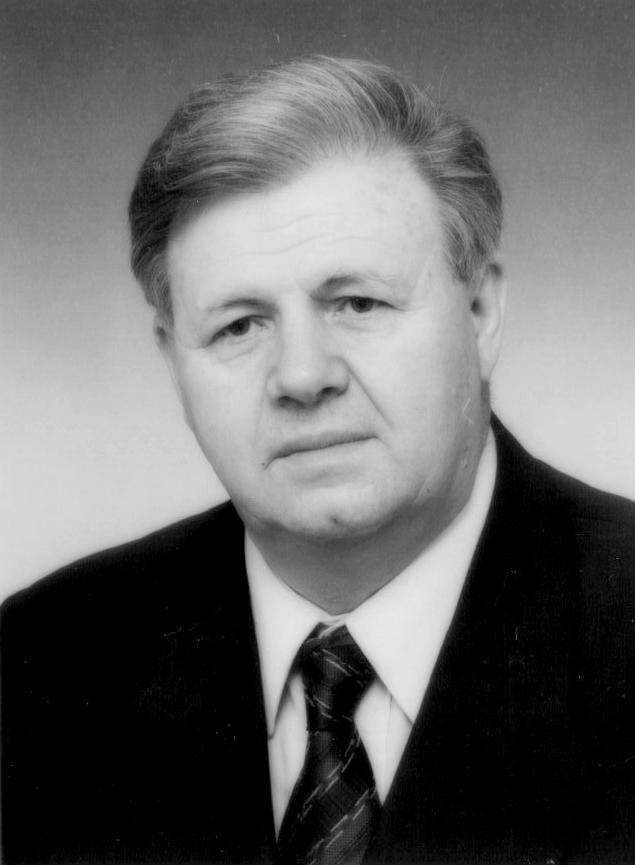
- Born: 25 December 1939 (age 86); Huma, Yugoslavia (now North Macedonia)
- Education: Ss. Cyril and Methodius University of Skopje; University of Belgrade
- Website: petaratanasov.webs.com

Petar Atanasov (born 25 December 1939) is a Megleno-Romanian linguist from North Macedonia. His scientific interests include lexicography and Aromanian, Megleno-Romanian and Romance linguistics. He was a professor in the Faculty of Philology at the Ss. Cyril and Methodius University of Skopje.

In 1995, the Office of the French Prime Minister issued the distinction Knight of the Order of Academic Palms to Atanasov for "his services to French culture". In 2011, Atanasov was awarded the medal Merit for the Education by the Office of President of Romania.

== Publications ==
- "Meglenoromâna". Tratat de dialectologie românească. Craiova. 1984. OCLC 17234929.
- Aromanski studii. Prilozi kon balkanistikata. With B. Nastev. Skopje: Ogledalo. 1988. OCLC 27434443.
- Le mégléno-roumain de nos jours. Une approche linguistique. Balkan-Archiv, Neue Folge – Beiheft, Band 7. Hamburg: Helmut Buske Verlag. 1990. OCLC 27338043.
- "Meglenoromâna astăzi". Editura Academiei Române. 2002. OCLC 608489657.
- "Atlasul lingvistic al dialectului meglenoromân (ALDM)". Editura Academiei Române. 1–2. 2008–2013. OCLC 876598100.
