= Cerna, Tulcea =

Cerna
- Commune
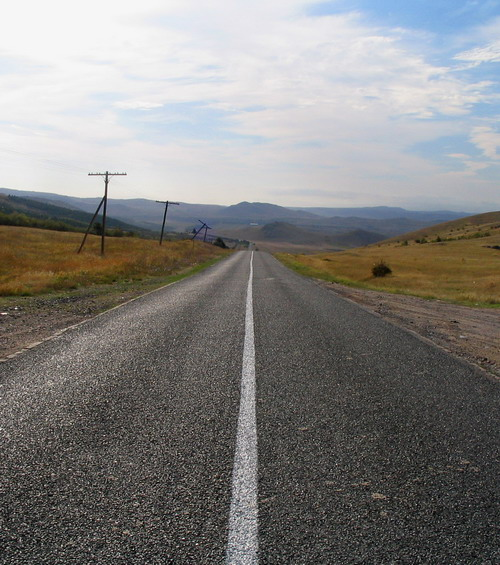
- The Priopcea Pass near Cerna village

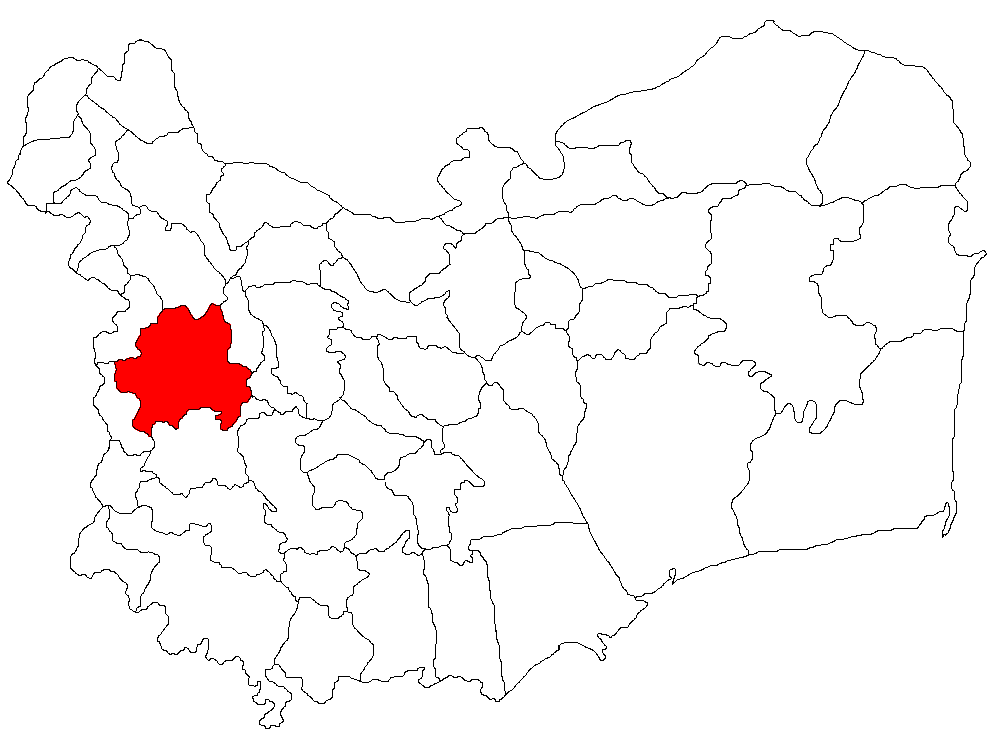
- Location in Tulcea County

- Location in Romania
- Coordinates: 45°05′N 28°19′E
- Country: Romania
- County: Tulcea
- Subdivisions: Cerna, General Praporgescu, Mircea Vodă, Traian

Government
  - Mayor (2024–2028): Petre Șopu (PSD)
- Area: 221.65 km^{2} (85.58 sq mi)
- Elevation: 54 m (177 ft)
- Population (2021-12-01): 3,051
  - Density: 13.76/km^{2} (35.65/sq mi)
- Time zone: UTC+02:00 (EET)
  - Summer (DST): UTC+03:00 (EEST)
- Postal code: 827045
- Area code: +40 x40
- Vehicle reg.: TL
- Website: primariacerna.ro

Cerna (Romanian pronunciation: [ˈt͡ʃerna]; Megleno Romanian: Cerna) is a commune in Tulcea County, Northern Dobruja, Romania. It is composed of four villages: Cerna (Bulgarian: Черна), General Praporgescu, Mircea Vodă (historical name: Acpunar), and Traian. The commune is inhabited by a large number of Megleno-Romanians.

== Demographics ==
Situated in a hilly landscape 55 km (34 mi) from the city of Tulcea and 25 km (16 mi) from Măcin, the village of Cerna had at the 2002 Romanian census a population of 2,427, and together with three smaller villages the population of the entire commune was 4,227. Estimates of the number of Megleno-Romanians in this village vary from 1,200 to 2,000, and they form the ethnic majority of it.

In 1940, according to the stipulations of the Treaty of Craiova, the Bulgarian population from Cerna was resettled to Southern Dobruja, mainly to the village of Turcsmil, which was renamed Nova Cherna (New Cerna) in the memory of their former place of origin. They were replaced by the current Megleno-Romanian local population. The Megleno-Romanian Dumitru Ciotti was mayor of the commune of Cerna from 1941 to 1942.

== Notable natives ==
- Panait Cerna (1881–1913), poet, philosopher, literary critic, and translator
