= Huma, North Macedonia =

Only Megleno-Romanian village in North Macedonia

Huma Ума or Хума (Macedonian) Umă or Uma (Megleno Romanian)
- Village
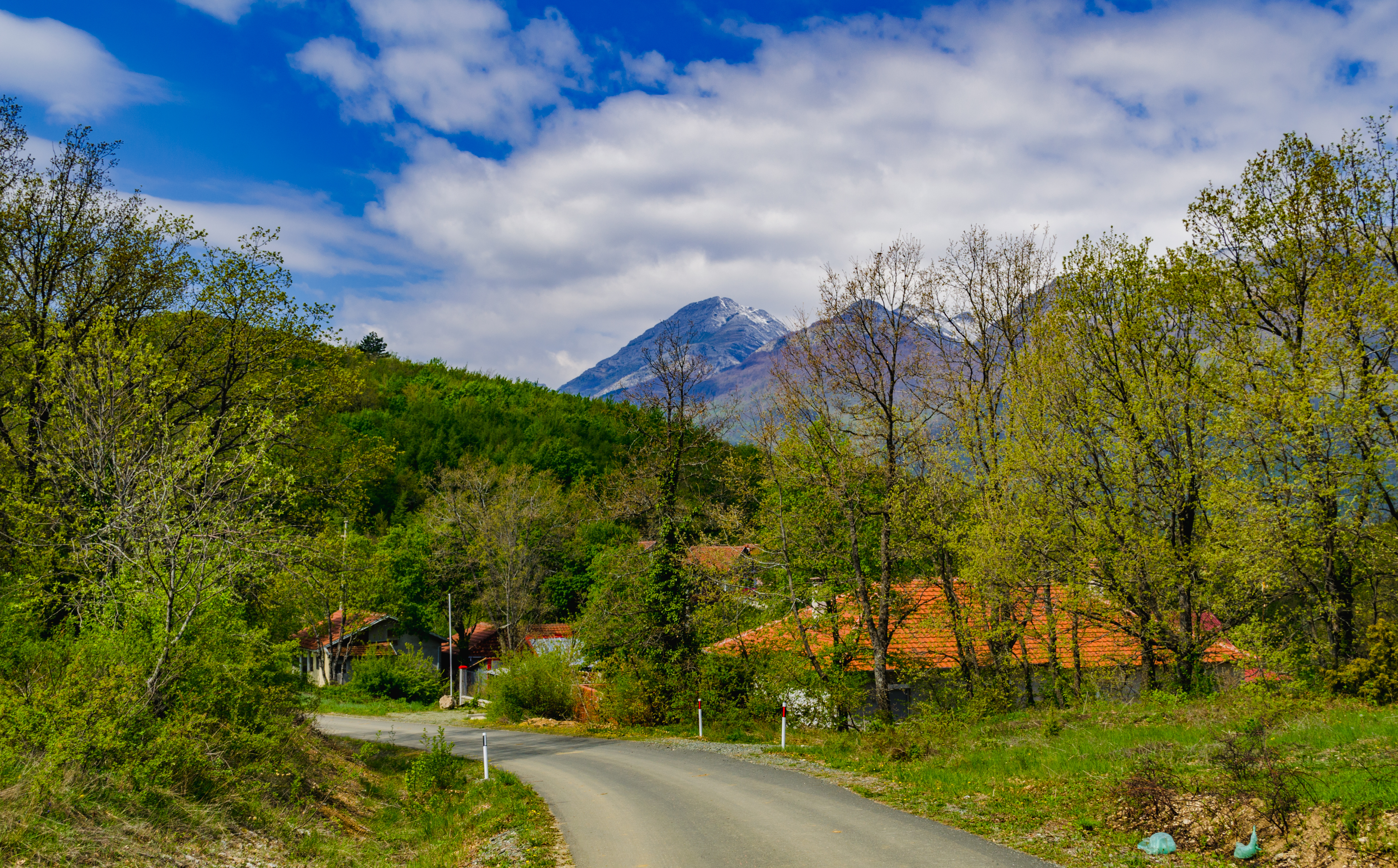
- View of the entrance to the village

- Location within North Macedonia
- Coordinates: 41°11′9″N 22°19′35″E
- Country: North Macedonia
- Region: Southeastern
- Municipality: Gevgelija

Population (2021)
  - Total: 4
- Demonyms: umineț (sg. and pl.; in Megleno-Romanian)
- Time zone: UTC+1 (CET)
  - Summer (DST): UTC+2 (CEST)

Huma (Macedonian: Ума or Хума; Megleno Romanian: Umă or Uma) is a village located in the Gevgelija municipality of North Macedonia. It is only a few kilometres from the border with Greece.

== History ==
Huma was razed during World War I. During Bulgaria's occupation of Serbia in the war, the Megleno-Romanians of Huma were deported to occupied Aleksinac.

== Demographics ==
As of 2021, the village of Huma has 4 inhabitants and the ethnic composition was the following:

- Vlachs (Megleno-Romanians) – 3
- Macedonians – 1

Huma remained the only Megleno-Romanian village in modern North Macedonia following the Slavicisation of Konsko (Coinsco or Conițca) and Sermenin (Sirminină or Sirminina), previously also Megleno-Romanian villages in which, by the end of the 19th century, Megleno-Romanian was no longer spoken. The demonym for Huma in Megleno-Romanian in both singular and plural is umineț.

== Notable people ==
- Petar Atanasov (born 1939), Megleno-Romanian linguist
