= Gudurica =

Gudurica Гудурица
- Village (Selo)
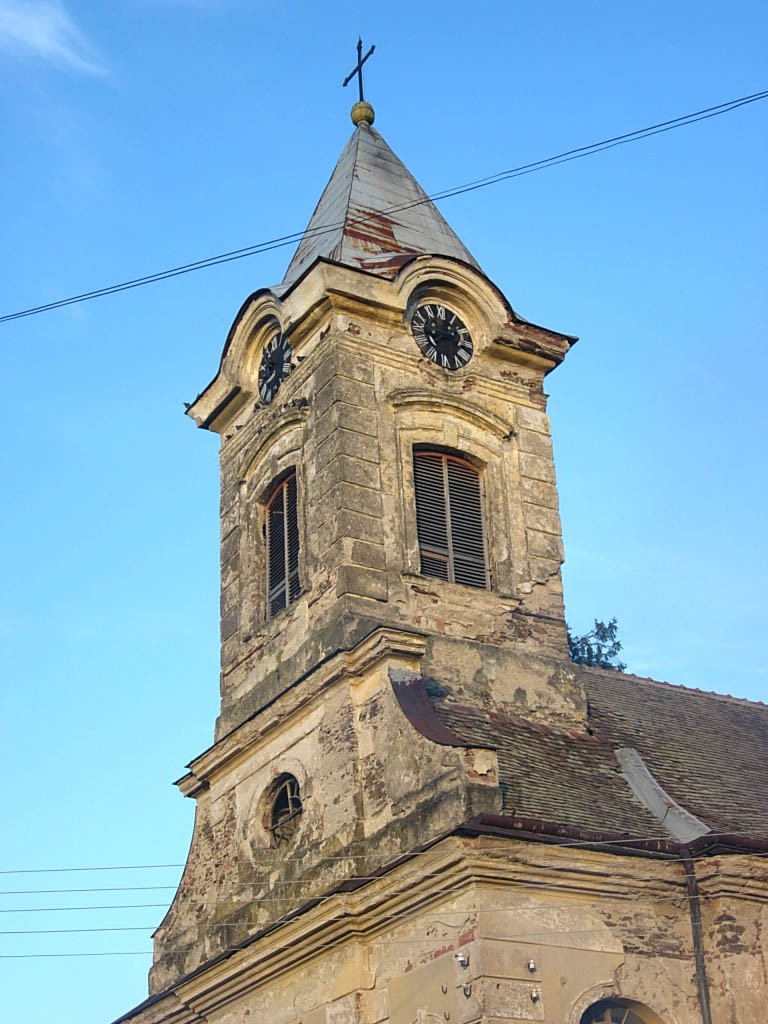

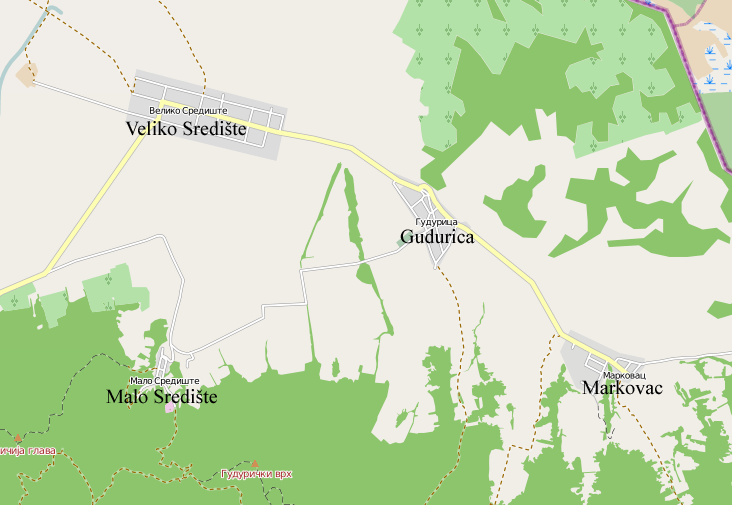

- Location of Gudurica within Serbia Gudurica (Serbia) Gudurica (Europe)
- Coordinates: 45°10′08″N 21°26′21″E
- Country: Serbia
- Province: Vojvodina
- District: South Banat
- Municipality: Vršac
- Elevation: 111 m (364 ft)

Population (2011)
  - Gudurica: 1,092
- Time zone: UTC+1 (CET)
  - Summer (DST): UTC+2 (CEST)
- Postal code: 26335
- Area code: +381(0)13
- Car plates: VŠ

Gudurica (Serbian Cyrillic: Гудурица; Hungarian: Temeskutas) is a village in Serbia. It is situated in the Vršac municipality, in the South Banat District, Vojvodina province. The village has a Serb ethnic majority (66.21%) and a sizable ethnic Macedonian minority (10.49%), and its population numbering 1,092 people (2011 census). Part of the Macedonians of Gudurica are in fact assimilated Aromanians and especially Megleno-Romanians that came to the village from the Macedonian SR following the expulsion of its native German population.

== Name ==
In Serbian the village is known as Gudurica (Гудурица), in Macedonian as Гудурица, in Hungarian as Temeskutas, and in German as Kudritz.

== History ==
The village was firstly mentioned in 1358. During Ottoman administration (16th-18th century) it was a Serb village. In 1728, it was settled by the Italians. Later, it was populated by Germans, and already in 1753, it was a predominantly German settlement. The village was located in a swampy area in the Banat Region. The first German settlers in Kudritz came from the Mosel river area in Western Germany, Alsace and Lorraine between 1719 and 1728. Descendants of the German inhabitants lived here until the end of World War II, when most of them left the area. After World War II, the village was populated by South Slavic (mostly Serb and Macedonian) settlers. The 2002 census also recorded 3 villagers of German ethnicity. Part of the Macedonian inhabitants of Gudurica are ethnic Aromanians and specially Megleno-Romanians or their descendants who self-identify as such as a result of assimilation. They were brought after World War II but were counted simply as Slavs, this being the reason why they have been largely ignored. Despite being mostly extinct, some Megleno-Romanians still remain in Gudurica; as of 2014, 3 people could speak the Megleno-Romanian language in the village.

== Historical population ==
- 1961: 2,105
- 1971: 1,560
- 1981: 1,448
- 1991: 1,338
- 2002: 1,267
- 2011: 1,092

== See also ==
- List of places in Serbia
- List of cities, towns and villages in Vojvodina
