= Victoria Barbă =

Moldovan film director (1926–2020)

- Born: Victoria Ivanovna Barbă; 19 September 1926; Tambov, Russian SFSR, Soviet Union
- Died: 3 May 2020 (aged 93)
- Occupation: Animated film director

Victoria Ivanovna Barbă (also Barbe; 19 September 1926 – 3 May 2020; Russian: Виктория Ивановна Барбэ) was a Moldovan animated film director, focused on movies for children. Having been born in modern Russia, she studied in Saint Petersburg and then in Chișinău, today in Moldova. She had a productive career, with an extensive filmography and numerous earned distinctions.

== Biography ==
Victoria Barbă was born on 19 September 1926 in Tambov, in the Soviet Union (now in Russia). Her father was a Megleno-Romanian, and she belonged to a family originally displaced from Southern Dobruja to Northern Dobruja following the Second Balkan War in 1913, after which they emigrated to the Tambov Governorate in the Russian Empire.

Barbă studied in the Leningrad Vera Mukhina Higher School of Art and Design in Leningrad (now Saint Petersburg, today in Russia) and in the Ion Creangă State Pedagogical Institute in Chișinău (today in Moldova). She would become director of animated films, especially oriented for children. She produced for Moldova-Film, a film studio and production company of the Moldavian SSR, and founded the Floricica Production House, aimed at cinema for children. During her career, Barbă received 98 diplomas, 19 awards and 8 gold medals at Soviet and Moldovan film festivals.

Her filmography includes the following films: Puiul de cocostârc în colivie ("The Baby Stork in a Cage", 1979), Mărțișor – sărbătoarea primăverii, ("Mărțișor – the Feast of Spring", 1980), Copii, soarele și zăpada ("Children, Sun and Snow", 1981), În jurul lumii ("Around the World", 1982), Opriți timpul ("Stop Time", 1982), Dragoste de țară ("Love to the Country", 1983), Hora de stele ("Hora of Stars", 1985), Ziua de naștere a Carolinei ("Carolina's Birthday", 1986), Căderea frunzelor ("Fall of the Leaves", 1987), Podul de stele ("Bridge of Stars", 1987), Fantezie cosmică ("Cosmic Fantasy", 1989), Iepurașul din ianuarie ("The January Rabbit", 1991).

Barbă died on 3 May 2020, aged 93.
