= Skra, Kilkis =

Village in Macedonia, Greece

Skra Σκρα
- Community
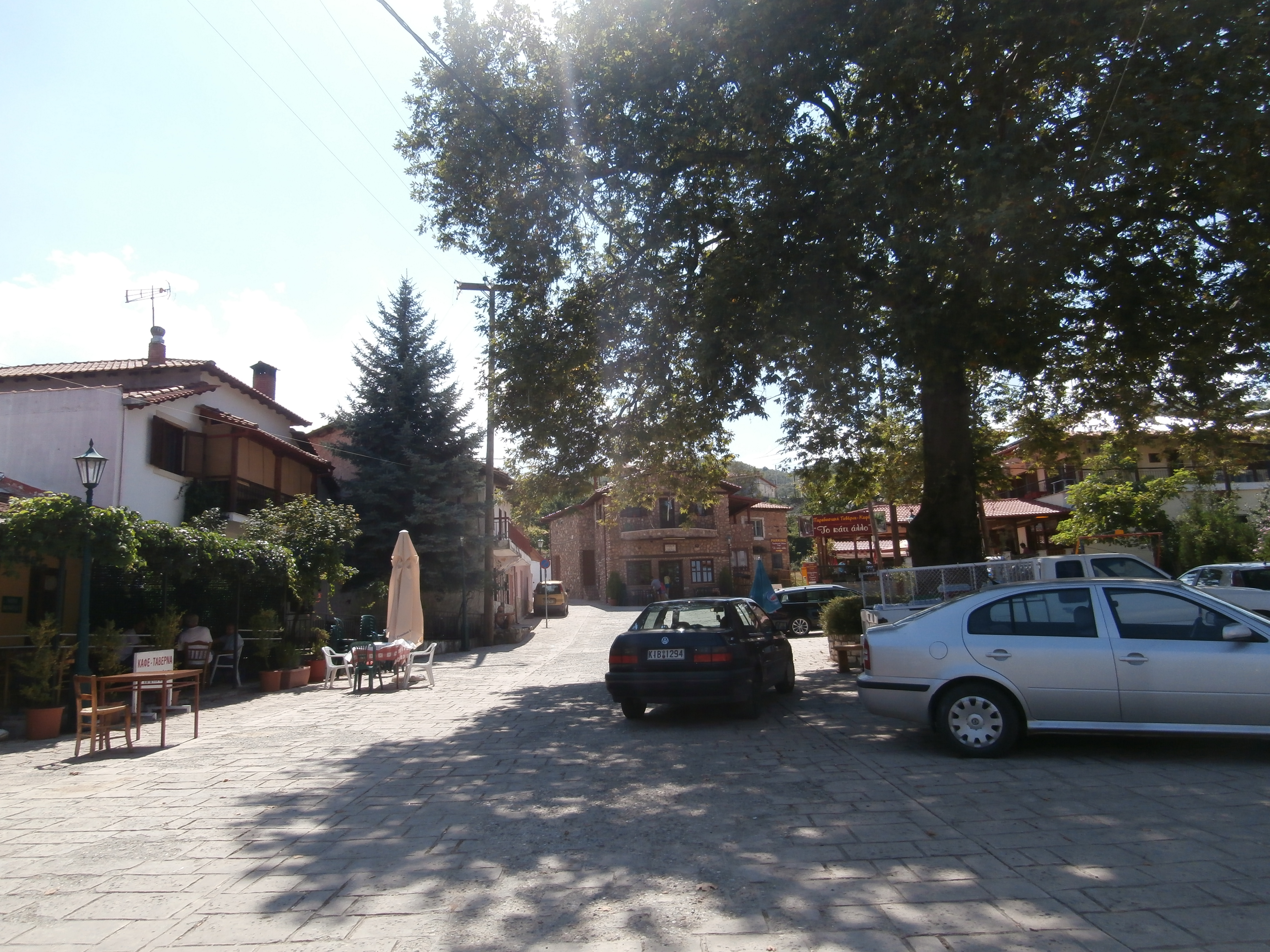
- Central square of Skra

- Location within Greece
- Coordinates: 41°05′38″N 22°22′59″E
- Country: Greece
- Geographic region: Macedonia
- Administrative region: Central Macedonia
- Regional unit: Kilkis
- Municipality: Paionia
- Municipal unit: Axioupoli

Population (2021)
  - Community: 172
- Time zone: UTC+2 (EET)
  - Summer (DST): UTC+3 (EEST)
- Postal code: 61 400
- Vehicle registration: KI

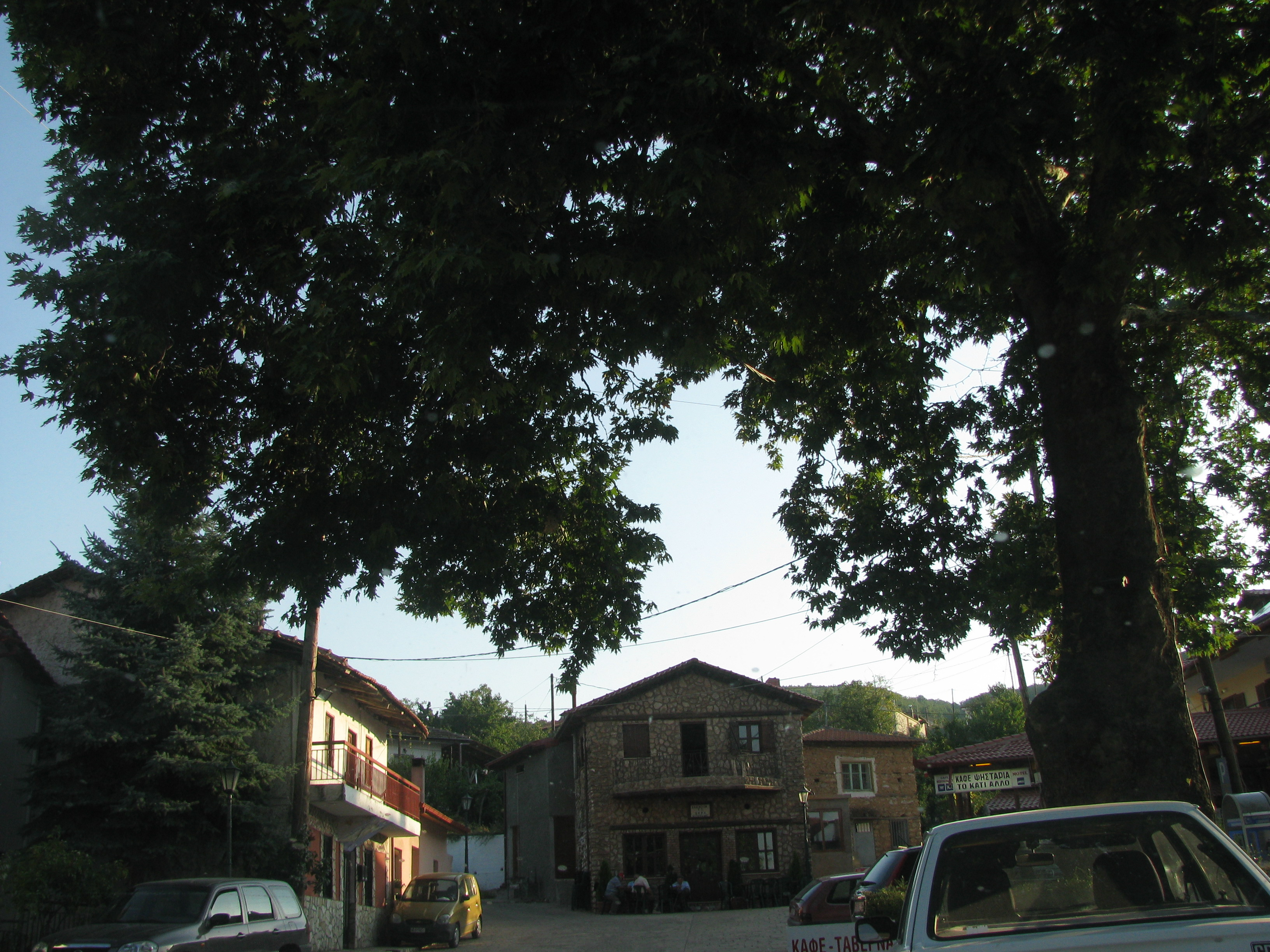
View of the town

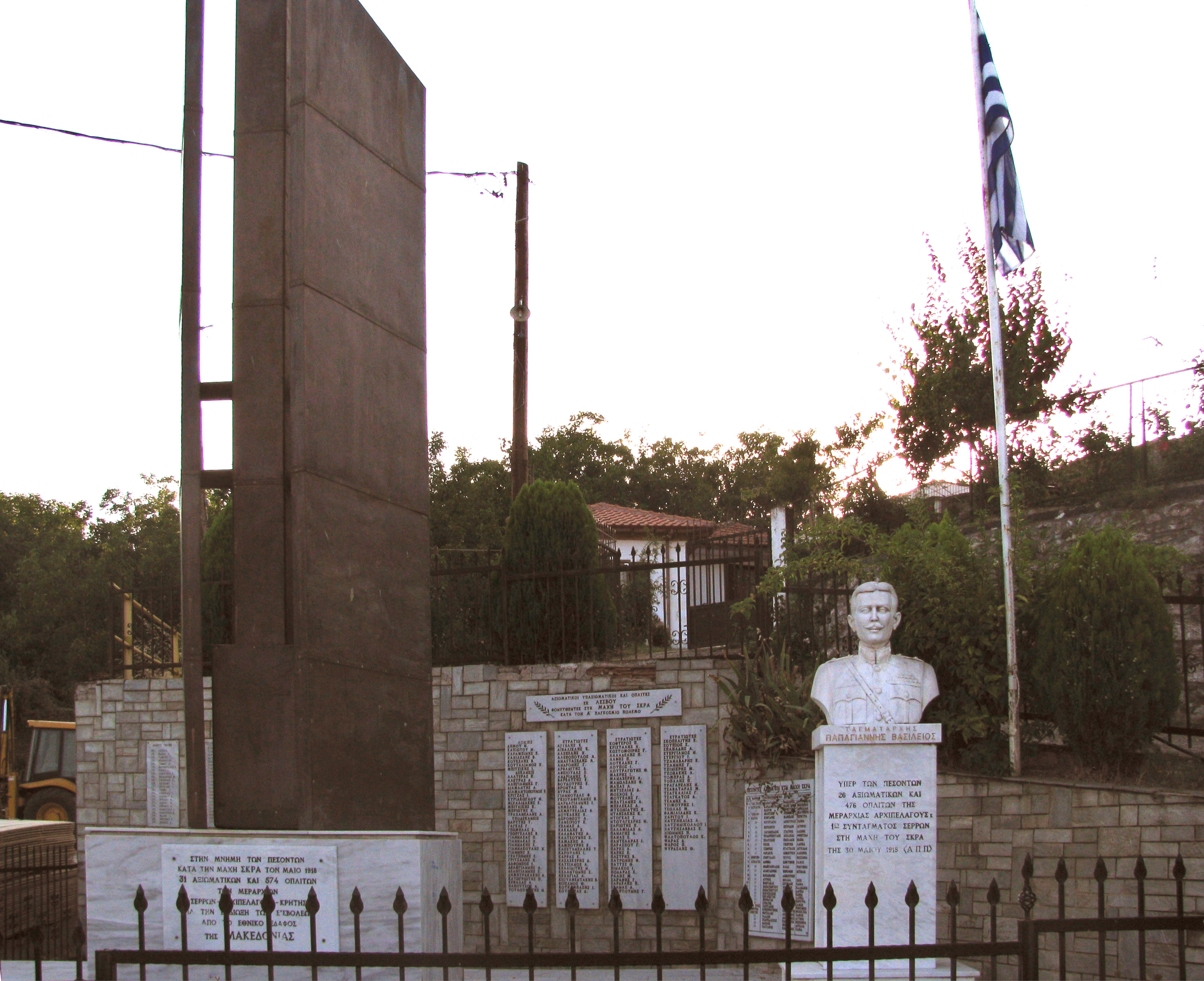
The memorial in Skra commemorating the Battle of Skra-di-Legen.

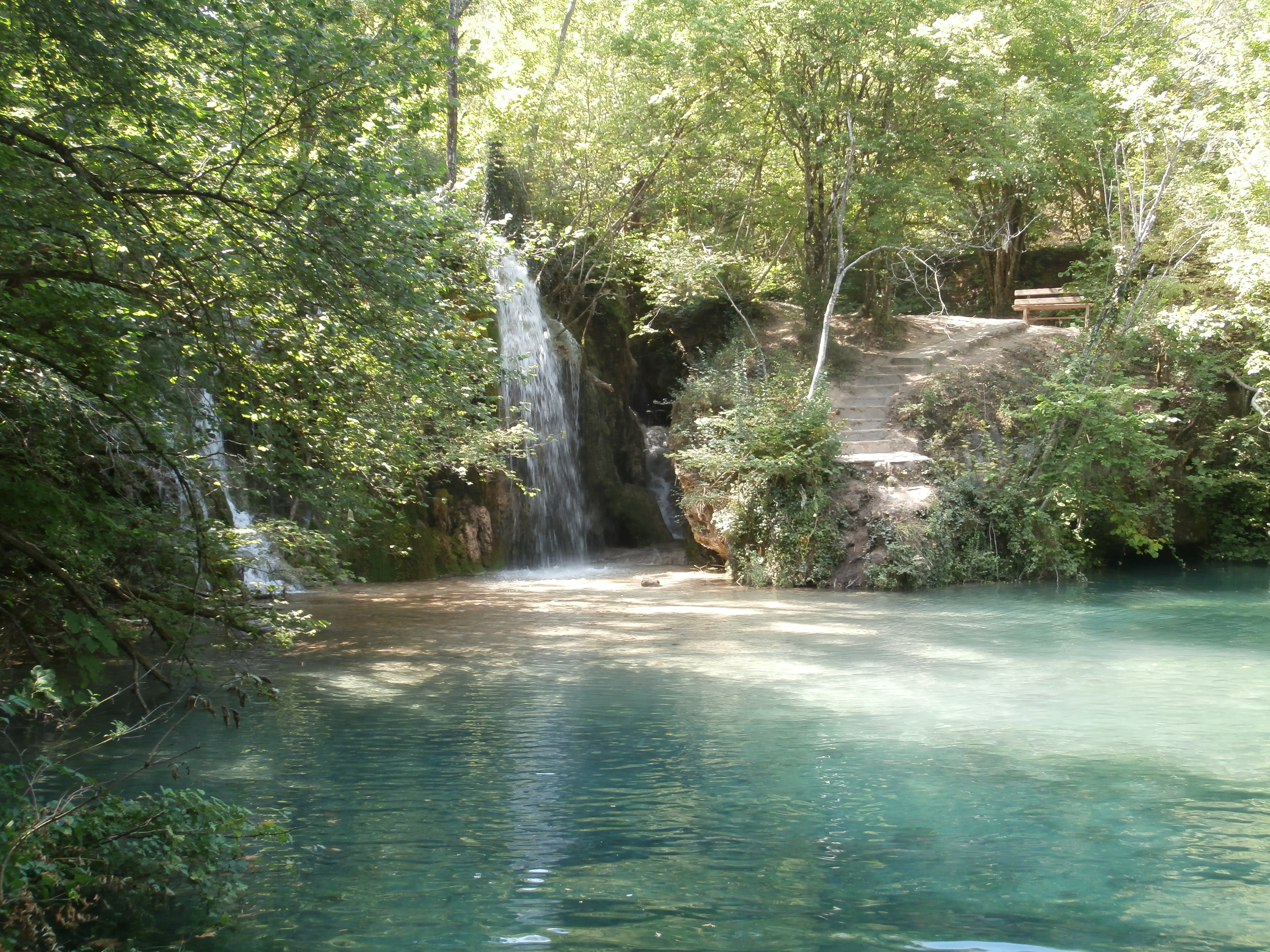
Skra waterfalls

Skra (Greek: Σκρα; before 1926 Loumitsa, Megleno Romanian: Liumnița) is a village and community in the municipality of Paionia, Kilkis regional unit of Greece.

In 2021 the population was 172 for the community, including the village Koupa. It is situated 10 km south of the border with the Republic of North Macedonia and its altitude is 548 m.

The village is best known for the Battle of Skra-di-Legen of May 1918. The village has a monument and museum dedicated to the battle.

Before the First World War, the village was much larger and inhabited mainly by Megleno-Romanians.

According to the book "Macedonia — ethnography and statistics" by Vasil Kanchov, there were 2,600 Megleno-Romanian inhabitants in the village in 1900.

== Notable people ==
- Dumitru Ciotti (1882/1885–1974), Megleno-Romanian activist, editor and schoolteacher
