= Archangelos, Pella =

Archangelos
- Community
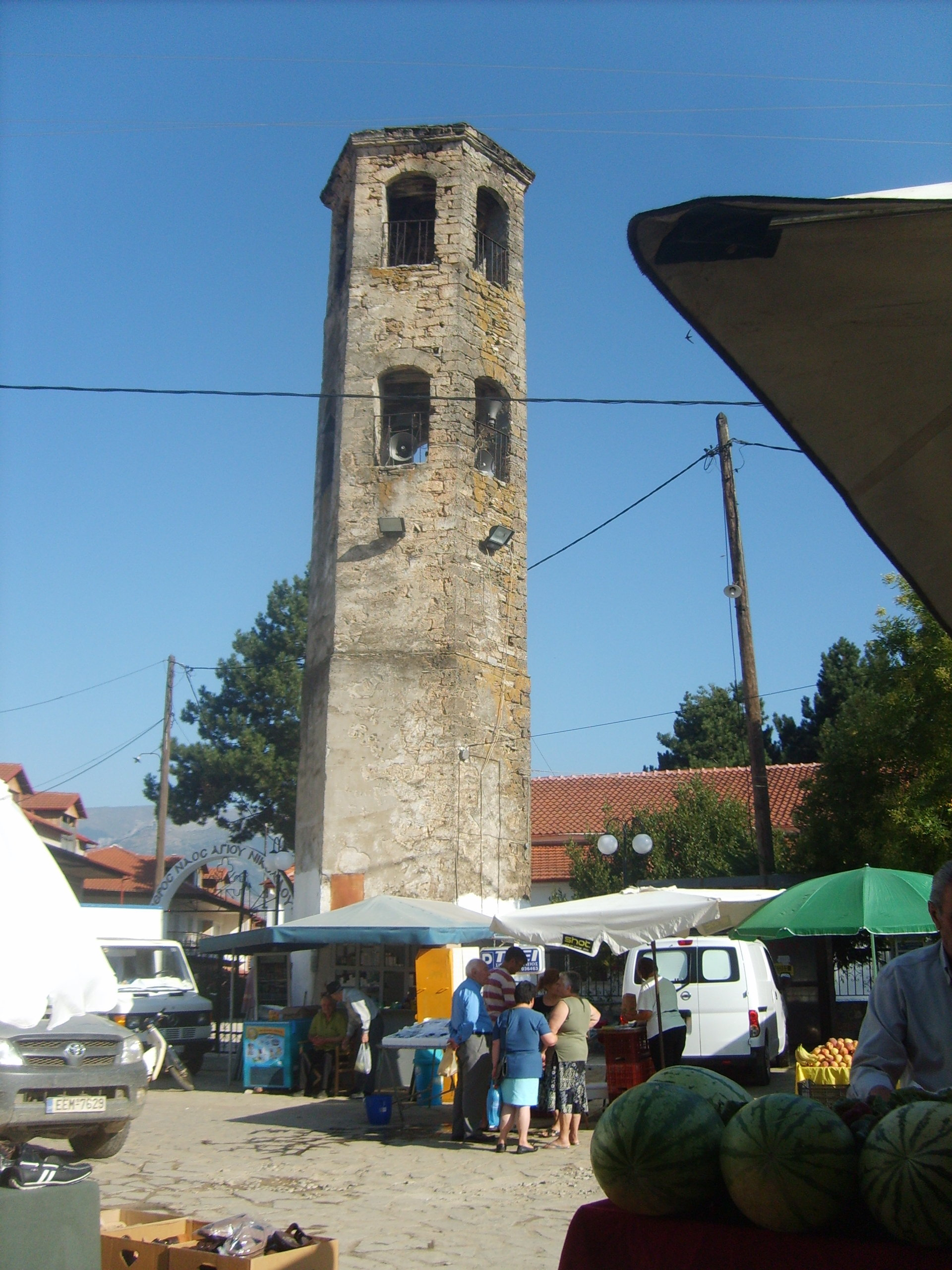
- Main square of Archangelos

- Location within Greece
- Coordinates: 41°4′58″N 22°16′49″E
- Country: Greece
- Geographic region: Macedonia
- Administrative region: Central Macedonia
- Regional unit: Pella
- Municipality: Almopia
- Municipal unit: Exaplatanos

Population (2021)
  - Community: 540
- Time zone: UTC+2 (EET)
  - Summer (DST): UTC+3 (EEST)

Archangelos (Greek: Αρχάγγελος, before 1925: Όσσιανη – Ossiani; Megleno Romanian: Oșani) is a village and part of the Exaplatanos municipal unit in the Pella regional unit of Macedonia, Greece, near Aridaia. The village is known for its monastery of Saint Michael, in which many monks occupy themselves with the painting of icons. The inhabitants of Archangelos mainly make their living out of the cultivation of cherries. The town is not widely known among tourists, though there are a few B&B's, shops and bars.

Archangelos had 709 inhabitants in 1981. In fieldwork done by anthropologist Riki Van Boeschoten in late 1993, Archangelos was populated by Vlachs. The Vlach language was used by people of all ages, both in public and private settings, and as the main language for interpersonal relationships. Some elderly villagers had little knowledge of Greek. People in the village are Meglen Vlachs or Megleno-Romanians.
