= Perikleia =

- Community
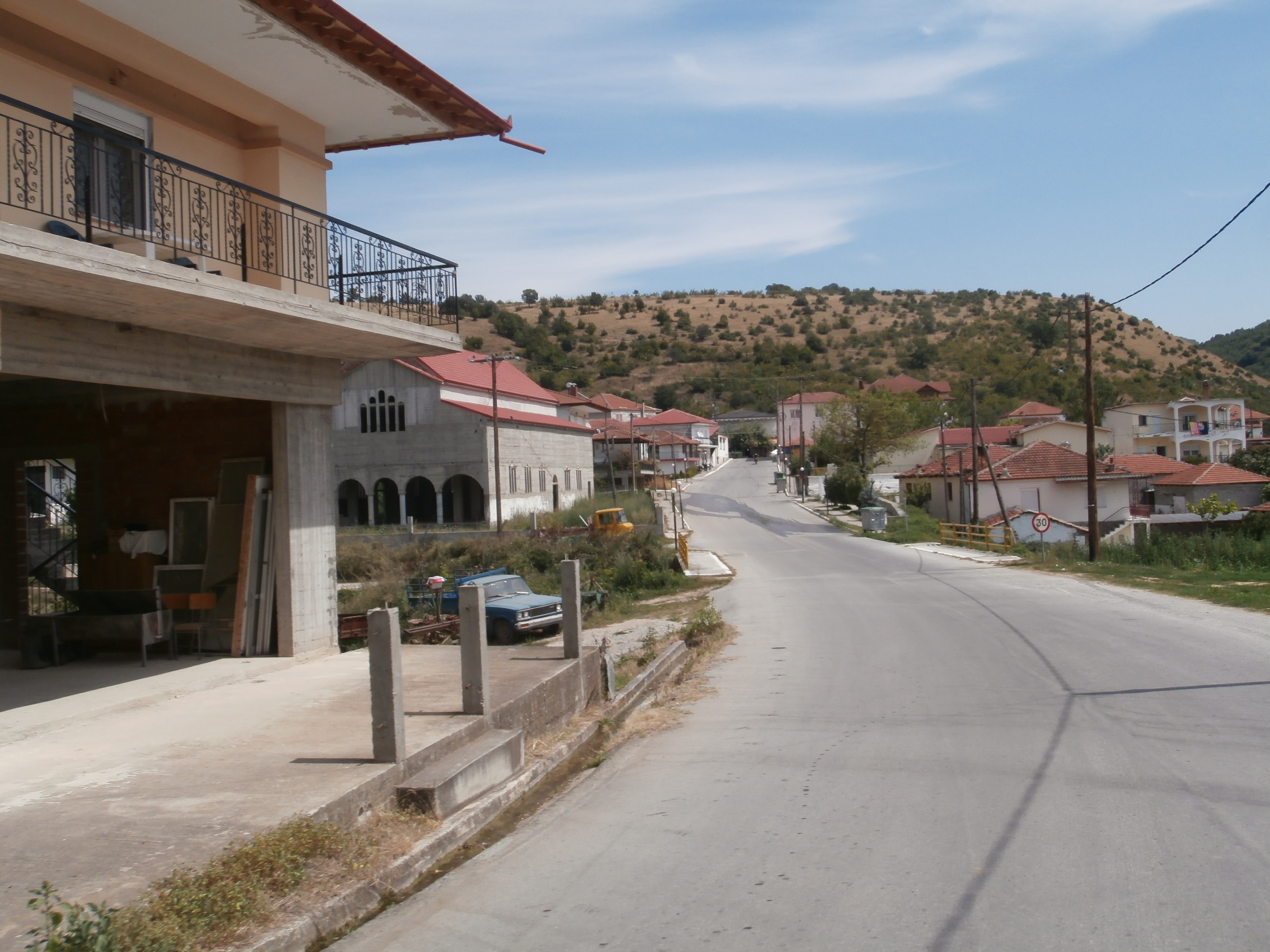

- Location within Greece
- Coordinates: 41°6′3″N 22°15′56″E
- Country: Greece
- Geographic region: Macedonia
- Administrative region: Central Macedonia
- Regional unit: Pella
- Municipality: Almopia
- Municipal unit: Exaplatanos

Population (2021)
  - Community: 370
- Time zone: UTC+2 (EET)
  - Summer (DST): UTC+3 (EEST)

Perikleia (Greek: Περίκλεια, before 1925: Μπερίσλαφ – Berislaf; Megleno Romanian: Birislav) is a village in Pella regional unit, Macedonia, Greece.

Perikleia had 373 inhabitants in 1981. In fieldwork done by anthropologist Riki Van Boeschoten in late 1993, Perikleia was populated by Vlachs. The Vlach language was used by people of all ages, both in public and private settings, and as the main language for interpersonal relationships. Some elderly villagers had little knowledge of Greek. The village is Megleno Vlach (Megleno-Romanian).
