= Beware of Greeks bearing gifts =

Latin phrase by Virgil

Timeō Danaōs et dōna ferentēs, paraphrased in English as "I fear the Greeks even when bearing gifts", is a Latin phrase from the Aeneid, a Latin epic poem written by Virgil between 29 and 19 BC. The utterance, spoken by Trojan priest Laocoön, refers to the Trojan Horse constructed by the Greeks during the Trojan War. The literal meaning of the phrase is "I fear the Danaans [Greeks], even those bearing gifts" or "even when they bear gifts". Most printed versions of the text have the variant ferentis instead of ferentes.

In modern English, the sentence is used as a proverb to warn against trusting an enemy or adversary, even when they appear to make an enticing offer.

== Origin ==
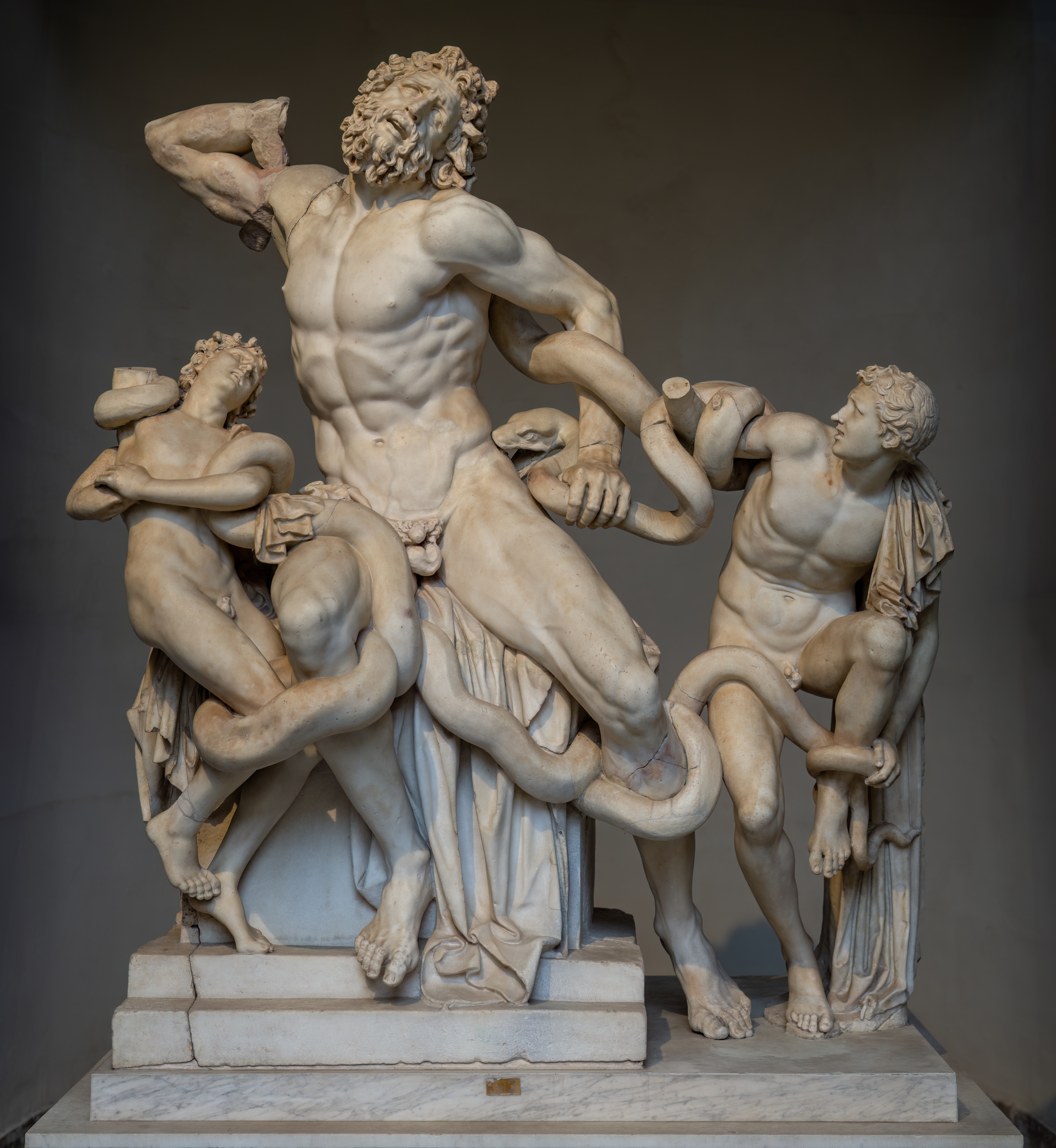
Laocoön and His Sons sculpture shows them being attacked by sea serpents

As related in the Aeneid, after a nine-year war on the beaches of Troy between the Danaans (Greeks from the mainland) and the Trojans, the Greek seer Calchas induces the leaders of the Greek army to win the war by means of subterfuge: build a huge wooden horse and sail away from Troy as if in defeat—leaving the horse behind as a votive offering for a safe journey home. The Trojan Horse actually contains a hand-picked team of Greek warriors hidden in its wooden belly. The Trojan priest Laocoön suspects that some menace is hidden in the horse, and he warns the Trojans not to accept the gift, crying, Equō nē crēdite, Teucrī! Quidquid id est, timeō Danaōs et dōna ferentēs. ("Do not trust the horse, Trojans! Whatever it is, I fear the Danaans, even when bringing gifts.") Immediately after Laocoön proclaims his warning, he throws a spear at the horse, which pierces its side; Virgil writes that the groan from the Greek warriors hidden within would surely have alerted the Trojans to the trick if the gods had not already ordained Troy's destruction.

Soon after he casts his spear, enormous twin serpents slither out of the sea and attack Laocoön's sons. When Laocoön tries to help them, he too is viciously slain. The Trojans assume the horse has been offered at Minerva's (Athena's) prompting and interpret Laocoön's death as a sign of her displeasure.

The Trojans agree unanimously to place the horse atop wheels and roll it through their impenetrable walls as a trophy of their victory. Festivities follow, celebrating the end of the war. That night, the Greeks hidden inside the horse creep out and open the city gates to the entire Greek army, which has sailed back to Troy under cover of darkness. The Greeks sack the city and Troy is destroyed.

== Uses ==
- In the modern era, the phrase was translated to Greek as Φοβοῦ τοὺς Δαναοὺς καὶ δῶρα φέροντας (Fovoú tous Danaoús kai dóra férontas, "fear the Danaans even when bearing gifts!").
- In popular culture, the phrase is quoted in the film Helen of Troy (1956), the film La Grande Bouffe (1973), the comic Asterix the Legionary, an episode of Inspector Morse series, and by Sean Connery in the film The Rock (1996). It also featured prominently in an episode "The Bed of Nails" of the early 1980s BBC sitcom Yes Minister, in which it was employed by numerous characters, including those of Sir Arnold Robinson (portrayed by John Nettleton) and Bernard Woolley (played by Derek Fowlds), who also explains the origin of the phrase, its slightly inaccurate translation, and clarifies that the phrase is clearly Latin and not Greek. The phrase is also quoted in The Three Musketeers (Dumas, 1844), and in an episode of The Kominsky Method by the main character Sandy Kominsky (played by Michael Douglas). American comedy duo Bob Booker and George Foster wrote recorded a 1968 comedy album with the phrase Beware of Greeks Bearing Gifts as a title.
- For a time, the phrase was the motto of the Aromanian newspaper Românul de la Pind.
- Murray Leinster in 1964 wrote the book The Greks Bring Gifts, sciencefiction story inspired by the mythological story of Troy.
