= Dimãndarea pãrinteascã =

Aromanian anthem

English: 'The Will of the Forefathers'
- Flag of the Aromanians
- Ethnic anthem of Aromanians
- Lyrics: Constantin Belimace, 1888
- Adopted: 1888

"Dimãndarea pãrinteascã" ('The Will of the Forefathers'), also known as "Pãrinteasca dimãndari" ('The Forefathers' Will'), is an Aromanian poem written in 1888, exhorting parents to teach their children the language, instead of assimilating into other Balkan ethnicities. As a result, it is often used as an anthem by some Aromanians.

== History ==
The anthem was written in 1888 in Bucharest by an Aromanian poet, Constantin Belimace.

== Lyrics ==
Aromanian original

Pãrinteasca dimãndari
Nã sprigiurã cu foc mari
Frats di mumã shi di un tatã
Noi, Armãnji di eta toatã.

Di sum plocili di murmintsã
Strigã (Grescu) a noshci bunj pãrintsã:
„Blãstem mãri s-aibã ãn casã
Cai di limba lui s-alasã

Cai s-alasã limba lui:
S-lu ardã pira focului
Si s-dirinã yiu pri loc
S-ãi si frigã limba ãn foc.

Nãs ãn vatralj pãrinteascã
Pi fumealjã s-nu s-hãrseascã
Di fumelãi curunji s-nu bashi
Njic ãn leagãn s-nu ãnfashe.

Cai fudzi di a lui mumã
Shi dit pãrinteascãlj numã:
Fugã-i doara Domnului
Shi dultseamea somnului!”

English translation

The will of the forefathers
Commands us with a great flame
Children of the same parents
We, the Aromanians from time immemorial.

From beneath their gravestones
Our good parents cry out:
"We curse you if you have at home
Someone who leaves his language

For whoever leaves his language:
Let him be burned by flames
Let him be destroyed alive where he stands
Let his tongue be burned in fire.

Before his ancestral hearth
Let him not enjoy a family
Let him not see a family get married
Let him not rock a child's cradle.

For whoever leaves his mother
And his ancestral name:
Let him ever lose God's grace
And the sweetness of sleep!"
