= Gradec, Vinica =

Gradec Градец
- Village
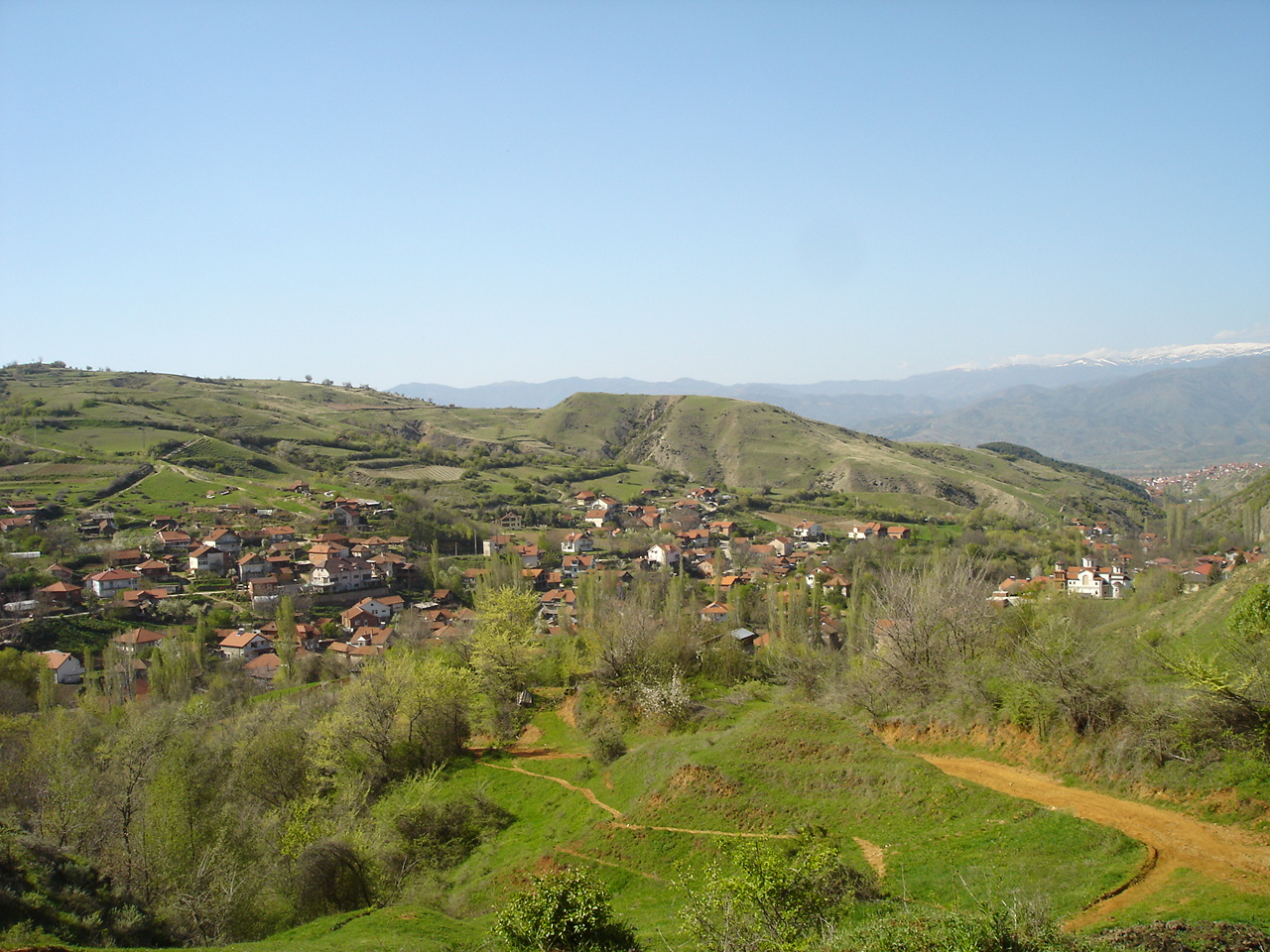
- View of the village

- Location within North Macedonia
- Coordinates: 41.848578°N 22.510086°E
- Country: North Macedonia
- Region: Eastern
- Municipality: Vinica

Population (2002)
  - Total: 1,245
- Time zone: UTC+1 (CET)
  - Summer (DST): UTC+2 (CEST)
- Website: .

Gradec (Macedonian: Градец) is a village in the municipality of Vinica, North Macedonia.

== Demographics ==
According to the 2002 census, the village had a total of 1,245 inhabitants. Ethnic groups in the village include:

- Macedonians 1,215
- Turks 9
- Romani 21
