= Megleno-Romanians =

Ethnic group native of Meglenia, in Greece and North Macedonia

Total population
- 5,000–20,000

Regions with significant populations
- Greece: 4,000
- North Macedonia: 1,000
- Turkey: 4,000–5,000
- Romania (Dobruja): 1,200
- Serbia (Banat): Unknown

Languages
- Megleno-Romanian, Greek, Macedonian

Religion
- Orthodox Christianity, Sunni Islam (in Turkey)

Related ethnic groups
- Aromanians, Istro-Romanians, Romanians

The Megleno-Romanians, also known as Meglenites (Megleno Romanian: Miglinits), Moglenite Vlachs or simply Vlachs (Megleno Romanian: Vlaș), are an Eastern Romance ethnic group, originally inhabiting seven villages in the Moglena region spanning the Pella and Kilkis regional units of Central Macedonia, Greece, and one village, Huma, across the border in North Macedonia. These people live in an area of approximately 300 km^{2} in size. Unlike the Aromanians, the other Romance-speaking population in the same historic region, the Megleno-Romanians are traditionally sedentary agriculturalists, and not traditionally transhumants. Sometimes, the Megleno-Romanians are referred as "Macedo-Romanians" together with the Aromanians.

They speak a Romance language most often called by linguists Megleno-Romanian or Meglenitic in English, and βλαχομογλενίτικα (vlakhomoglenítika) or simply μογλενίτικα (moglenítika) in Greek. The people themselves call their language vlahește, but the Megleno-Romanian diaspora in Romania also uses the term meglenoromână.

Unlike the other Eastern Romance populations, over time Megleno-Romanians have laid aside a name for themselves which originates in the Latin Romanus, and instead have adopted the term Vlasi or Vlashi, derived from "Vlachs", a general term by which, in the Middle Ages, non-Romance peoples designated Romance peoples and shepherds. The term Megleno-Romanians was given to them in the 19th century by the scholars who studied their language and customs, based on the region in which they live.

Their number is estimated between 5,213 (P. Atanasov, most recent estimate), and 20,000 (P. Papahagi, c. 1900). There is a larger Megleno-Romanian diaspora in Romania (c. 1,500 people), a smaller one in Turkey (c. 500 people) and an even smaller one in Serbia. Greece does not recognize national minorities, thus this approximately 4,000-strong community does not have any official recognition from Greece. Another 1,000 Megleno-Romanians live in North Macedonia. It is believed, however, that there are up to 20,000 people of Megleno-Romanian descent worldwide (including those assimilated into the basic populations of these countries).

== History ==
=== Origins ===
The Moglena region (Turkish: Karacaova) is located in the north of Greece at the border with North Macedonia. It is roughly bounded by the Vardar river to the east, by the Kožuf and Voras mountains to the west, by the plains of Giannitsa and Edessa to the south, and by the Mariansca Mountains to the north.

Historians Ovid Densusianu and Konstantin Jireček considered that Megleno-Romanians descended from a mixture of Romanians with Pechenegs, settled in Moglen by the Byzantine Emperor Alexios I Komnenos in 1091. They argued this on the basis in part of the Asian-like facial appearance (more prominent cheek bones) of Meglen Vlachs. By contrast, Gustav Weigand and George Murnu believed that Megleno-Romanians were descendants of the Romanian-Bulgarian Empire who retreated to Moglen. This view was opposed by Jireček. Pericle Papahagi argued for another version, according to which the Megleno-Romanians are descendants of a group of Romanians who were incorrectly called Vlachs and who came to Meglen area during the times of Dobromir Chrysos. Strez, another Vlach member of the Asan family, amplified Chrysos' lands by adding Macedonian territories for his principality.

Megleno-Romanians used to have a traditional custom, called bondic, where the head of a household would take an oak log and place it in the hearth just before Christmas, burning it bit by bit until Epiphany. The resulting charcoal would be put under fruit trees to make them fertile. A similar custom called bavnic, but with specific variations, also existed among Aromanians, some Romanians and Latvians. This custom is found in Orthodox South Slavic cultures (Serbian badnjak, Bulgarian budnik, Macedonian badnik). Some believe that these customs and other cultural archetypes discovered by scientists are proof that Megleno-Romanians come from a mountainous region.

Theodor Capidan, studying the resemblance of the Megleno-Romanian language with Romanian and other languages, concluded that Megleno-Romanians must have spent some time in the Rhodope Mountains before moving on to Moglen (due to the presence of elements similar to those found in the language of the Bulgarians in the Rhodopes). But both Papahagi and Capidan observed that Aromanian and Megleno-Romanian lack a Slavic influence, but show Greek influence instead. The study of Megleno-Romanian and other Eastern Romance varieties led Capidan to believe that during the establishment of the Romanian language in the Early Middle Ages, there was an ethnic Romanian continuity on both banks of the Danube (north and south).

There were several small hamlets and cottage settlements at high elevations at Mount Paiko before the founding of today's Megleno-Romanian villages. From the medieval and modern periods, it is known that Megleno-Romanians had an administration of their own. Each village was led by a captain. Their economic and social centre was the town of Nânta. After the incursions of the Pomaks of Moglen against the Ottomans, the latter started a persecution campaign against villages in the area, including those of the Megleno-Romanians. Most of the villages were put under the administration of an Ottoman bei, who exploited them to the extreme in exchange for their security. The village of Oșani (today Archangelos, Pella), however, resisted much longer before submitting to Ahmed Beg around 1790, having benefitted from the leadership of an able captain and a willingness from the population to put up an armed resistance even after his murder.

=== Demographic history ===
The number of Megleno-Romanians was estimated by different authors as follows:

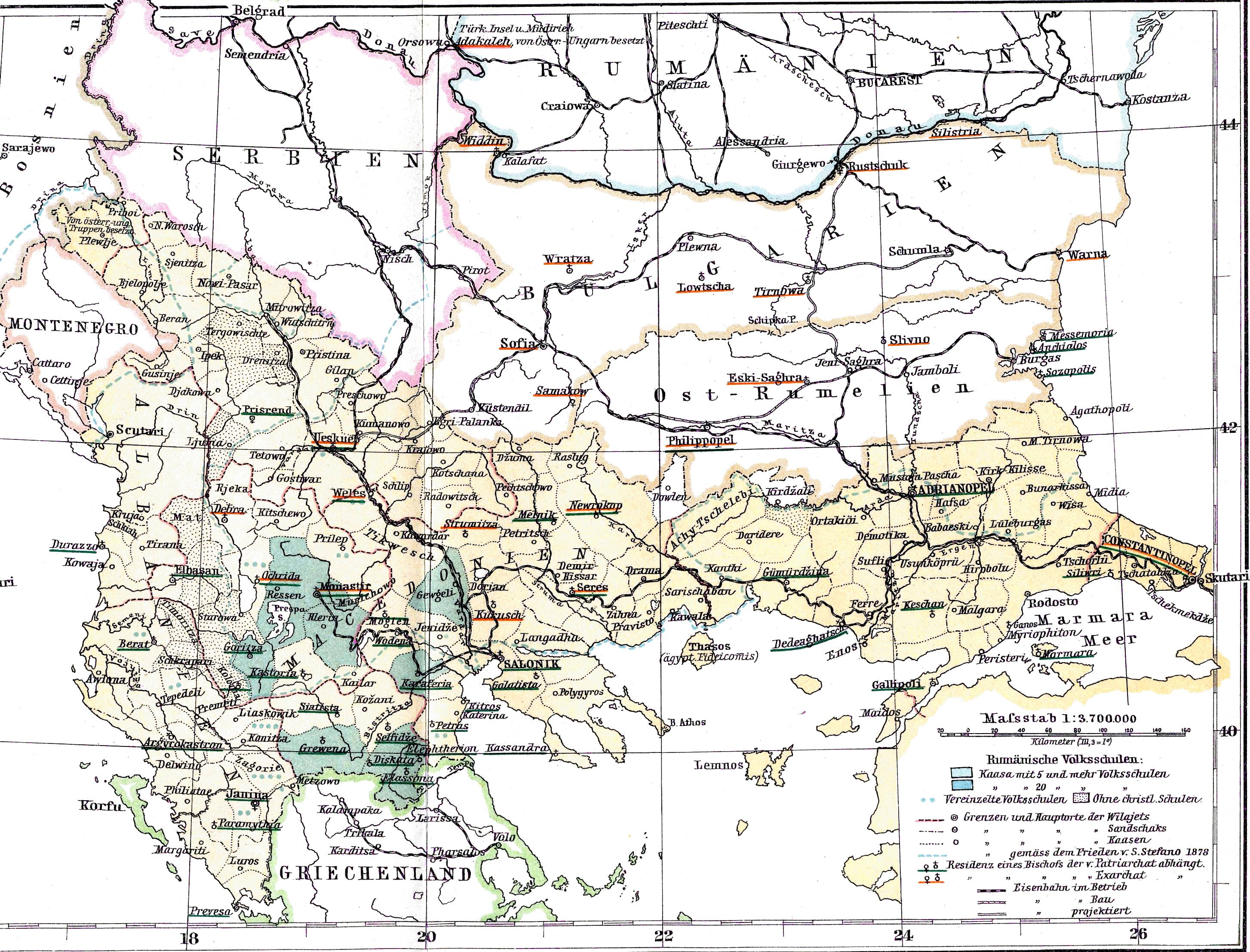
Romanian schools for Aromanians and Megleno-Romanians in the Ottoman Empire (1886)

- 14,000 in 1892
- 21,700 in 1895
- 11,960 in 1900
- 20,000 in 1902
- 14,720 in 1925

In 1900, the then province of Gevgelija, which contained most of the Megleno-Romanian settlements, had a population of 49,315, of which 20,643 Slavs, 14,900 Turks, 9,400 Christian Aromanians and Megleno-Romanians, 3,500 Muslim Megleno-Romanians, 655 Romani, and 187 Circassians. The villages of Meglen Vlachs had in 1900 the following populations:

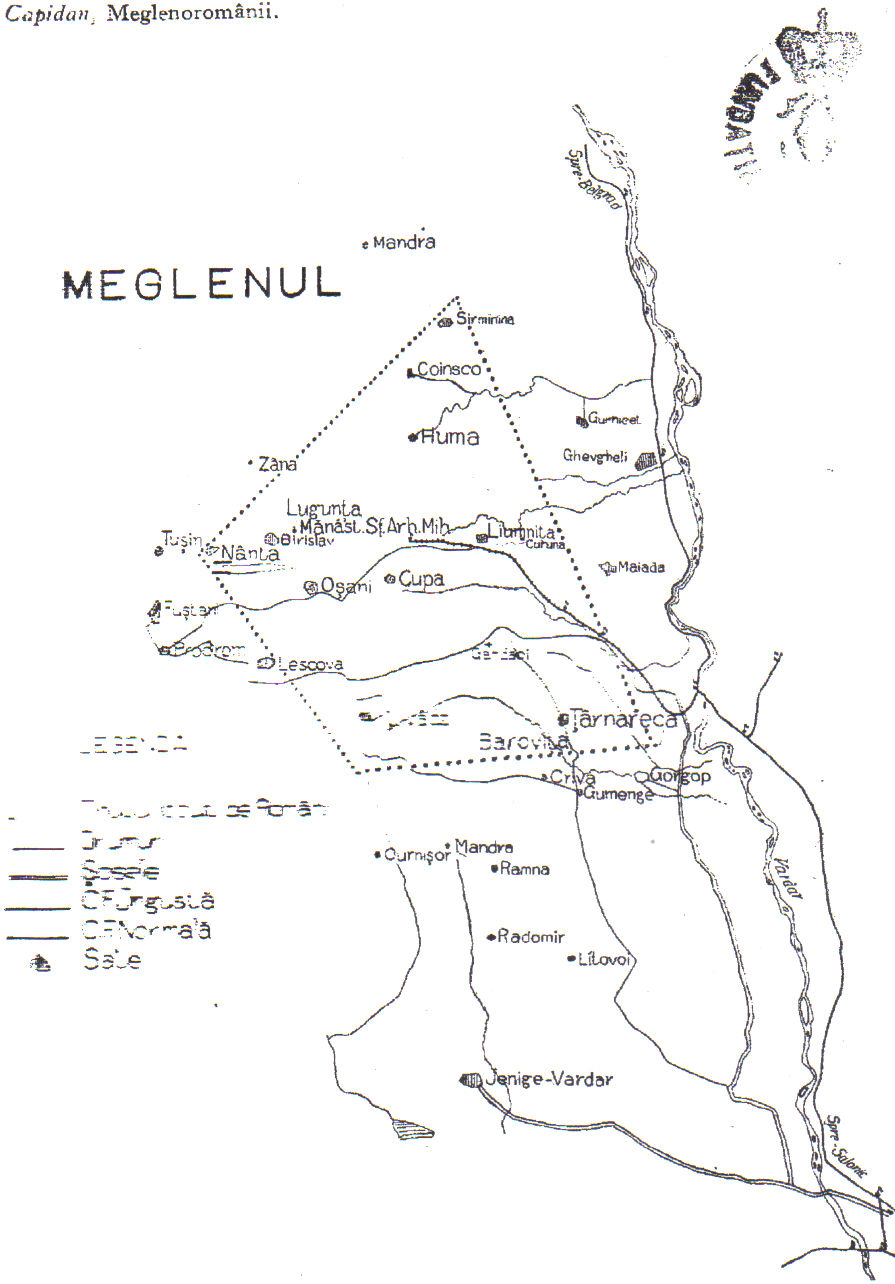
Megleno-Romanian settlements in Greece and North Macedonia in a 1925 map

Village	Population
Notia (Nânti, Nânta)	3,660
Perikleia (Birislav)	380
Lagkadia (Lugunța, Lundzini)	700
Archangelos (Oșani)	1,500
Skra (Liumnița)	2,600
Koupa (Cupa)	600
Kastaneri (Barovița)	237
Karpi (Tarnareca)	400
Huma (Umă, Uma)	490
Konsko (Coinsco, Conițca)	560
Sermenin (Sirminină, Sirminina)	480
Livadia (Livezi, Giumala de Jos or Livãdz in Aromanian)^{1}	2,100

^{1}Aromanian village surrounded by the Megleno-Romanian ones.

=== 20th century ===
Most Meglen Vlachs are Orthodox Christians, but the population of the village of Nânti (Nótia), which in 1900 had a population of 3,660, of which 3,500 Megleno-Romanians, in the Upper Karadjova Plain converted to Islam in the 17th or 18th century. It is the only case among Eastern Romance populations of an entire community converting to Islam. The entire population of this village was expelled by force to Turkey in 1923, as part of the population exchange between Greece and Turkey, where they mostly settled in Kırklareli and Şarköy, and became known as Karadjovalides (Turkish: Karacaovalılar) after the Turkish name of Moglen (Karacaova).

Since 1913, after the Second Balkan War, there was a general policy of the Balkan states to achieve greater ethnic uniformity through exchange of population. On September 29, 1913, a first such treaty was signed between Turkey and Bulgaria regarding exchange of population up to a range of 15 km from their border. The Treaty of Neuilly-sur-Seine (November 27, 1919) led to an exchange of 40,000 Greeks for 80,000 Bulgarians between the two countries. After the Greek-Turkish War, by the Treaty of Lausanne, 500,000 of Turks and other Muslims were exchanged for a comparable number of Asia Minor Greeks. Muslim Megleno-Romanians, despite all their protests were forcefully deported to Turkey because of their religion. A significant number of incoming Greeks were settled in Greek Macedonia and Greek Thrace, including in traditional Aromanian and Megleno-Romanian areas. Economic and social consequences soon ensued, and local conflict between Aromanians and Greeks appeared. Acts of intimidation by the Greek authorities led to the formation in 1921–1923 of a national movement among Aromanians and Megleno-Romanians favourable to the idea of emigration to Romania, especially from Moglena, Veria and Vodena.

In 1926, about 450 families of Megleno-Romanians of Greece moved to Romania, and settled in Southern Dobruja (the "Cadrilater" or "Quadrilateral"), a region which became Romanian in 1913. They originated from the villages of Oșani, Liumnița, Cupa, Lundzini, Birislav, and Livezi, and were settled in villages around the city of Silistra such as Cocina (Turkish: "Koçina", now Profesor-Ishirkovo), Cazimir (Turkish: "Kazemir", now Kazimir), Capaclia (Turkish: "Kapaklı", now Slatina), Bazarghian (Turkish: "Bezirgan", now Miletich), Aidodu (Turkish: "Aydoğdu", now Zvezdel), Tatar Admagea (Turkish: "Tatar Atmaca", now Sokol), Uzungi Ozman (Turkish: "Uzunca Orman", now Bogdantsi), Strebarna Viskioi (Now Sreburna), Cadichioi (Turkish: "Kadıköy", now Maluk Preslavets), Haschioi (Turkish: "Hasköy", now Dobrotitsa).

After Bulgaria re-acquired Southern Dobruja from Romania in 1940, the Megleno-Romanians were deported during the population exchange between Bulgaria and Romania to other regions of Romania, most of them to the village of Cerna in the Tulcea County, in northern Dobruja. 270 families of Megleno-Romanians and 158 families of Aromanians settled in this village in 1940. However, between 1940 and 1948, the Aromanian families moved to other localities of Dobruja.

In 1947–1948, the new Communist authorities deported 40 Megleno-Romanian families from Cerna to Ialomița and Brăila Counties, and to Banat. Only a few of them returned to Cerna, where about 1,200 continue to speak Megleno-Romanian.

Another wave of Megleno-Romanians emigrated to Romania and to other countries during World War II and the Greek Civil War, due to the heavy fighting in the Moglena region.

== Geographical distribution ==
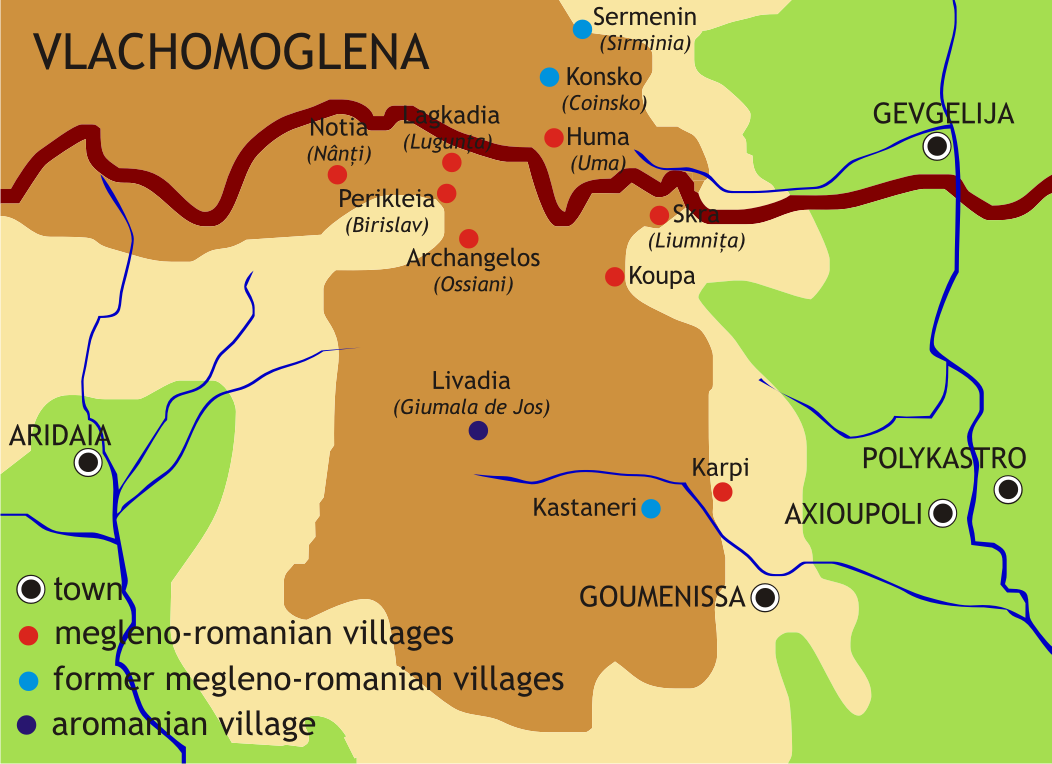
Map of Megleno-Romanians settlements in Greece and North Macedonia

The following is a list of the Megleno-Romanian settlements.

=== Greece ===
In seven villages (including one already assimilated) and the small town of Notia, c. 4,000 Moglen Vlachs still speak their language today, while several thousand others are already assimilated:

(Greece) Archangelos (Megleno-Romanian: Oșani)
(Greece) Karpi (Megleno-Romanian: Tarnareca)
(Greece) Koupa (Megleno-Romanian: Cupa)
(Greece) Langadia (Megleno-Romanian: Lugunța, Lundzini)
(Greece) Notia (Megleno-Romanian: Nânti, Nânta)
(Greece) Perikleia (Megleno-Romanian: Birislav)
(Greece) Skra (Megleno-Romanian: Liumnița)

Former Megleno-Romanian village

(Greece) Kastaneri (Megleno-Romanian: Barovița)

In the 1990s, the European Commission's Euromosaic Project documenting minority languages recorded the geographic distribution and language status of Megelo-Romanians and Megelo-Romanian in Greece. In the administrative division of Kilkis, 3 historic villages, in 3 other villages and in the city of Kilkis. In the administrative division of Pella, 3 historic villages, in 2 other villages, half the population in the village of Exaplatanos and some in the town of Aridaia.

=== North Macedonia ===
Less than 1,000 people of Megleno-Romanian descent, most of whom are already Slavicized, live in one village and in the town of Gevgelija. c. 200, mostly old people, still speak the Megleno-Romanian:

- (North Macedonia) Huma (Megleno-Romanian: Umă, Uma)

Former Megleno-Romanian villages

- (North Macedonia) Konsko (Megleno-Romanian: Coinsco, Conițca)
- (North Macedonia) Sermenin (Megleno-Romanian: Sirminină, Sirminina)

=== Diaspora ===
==== Turkey ====
The first emigration from Nanti was in 1912 to Soğucak, Vize and Demirköy, Kırklareli in the Ottoman Empire. In 1923, the entire population of the village of Nânti (Nótia), the only case among Eastern Romance populations with an entire community converting to Islam, was expelled by force to Turkey, as part of the population exchange between Greece and Turkey.

These 3,700 people mostly settled in the Edirne area (mainly in Kırklareli and Şarköy) of Turkish East Thrace, and became known as Karacaovalılar in Turkish or Karadjovalides in Greek after the region of Almopia or Meglen, known in Turkish as Karadjova. The Muslim Megleno-Romanians from the village Notia call thelmselves Nantinets and their language as Nantinești; in Turkish, they are known as Nutyalı. They converted to Islam in 1759. In Turkey, marriage between them and Pomaks was common.

(Turkey) Kırklareli, near Edirne.

The number of families settled in Turkish cities and villages were: Kırklareli (110), Edirne (100), Şarköy (80), Babaeski (70), Lüleburgaz (80), Uzunköprü (100), Çorlu (100), Malkara (50), Ballı (10), Gözsüzköy (50), Kalamiş (50), Hoşköy (20), Mürefte (5), according to the German scholar Thede Kahl.

At present they number only 500 Karacaovalılar, concentrated in Kırklareli and culturally assimilated to the Turks (most of them speak mainly the Turkish language).

==== Romania ====
They adopted the Megleno-Romanian exonym promoted by the Romanian authorities. As of 1996, in the whole of Romania there were about 820 families claiming Megleno-Romanian origin.

(Romania) Cerna, a commune in Tulcea County,

Situated in a hilly landscape 55 km from the city of Tulcea and 25 km from Măcin, the village of Cerna had at the time of the 2002 Romanian census a population of 2,427, and together with three smaller villages the population of the entire commune was 4,227. Estimates of the number of Megleno-Romanians in this village vary from 1,200 to 2,000. In this locality, Megleno-Romanians settled according to the villages they originate from in Moglena: lumnicianii, those from Lumnița in the South-East, lunzaneții, those from Lugunța in the North, usineții, those from Oșani in the Center, North and North-East, cupineții, those from Cupa in the West, while Romanians and Bulgarians that lived in the village before them are concentrated in the Western part of the village.

Megleno-Romanians in that village preserved their Megleno-Romanian language very well. c. 1,200 people speak the language today.

However, their small overall number meant that after 1950 mixed marriages with Romanians became more frequent, unlike the Aromanians who by the nature of their traditional occupations have developed a special psychology, gaining importance in Romanian society and preserving the identity of their people (very few mixed marriages with Romanians occur). However, due to the hardships this small community has endured, Megleno-Romanians in Romania remain very united, with a very acute sense of nation. During their weddings, they use the Romanian tricolor as a furglița (wedding flag), and very rarely the traditional white-red colors. This illustrates the fact that despite their distinct (albeit also Eastern Romance) language, Megleno-Romanians in Romania identify themselves as Romanians. According to one observer, they consider themselves "more Romanian than the Romanians".

Very small numbers of Megleno-Romanians also live in the communes of Variaș and Biled, and in the city of Jimbolia in Timiș County, in the historic region of Banat in Romania.

In Romania, in 2021, the Balkan Romanianness Day was established as a holiday meant for all the allegedly ethnic Romanian subgroups living south of the Danube. This includes the Megleno-Romanians as well as the Aromanians and the Istro-Romanians. It commemorates the establishment of the Ullah millet in 1905 and is officially celebrated every 10 May.

==== Serbia ====
A very small community of Megleno-Romanians also lives in Serbia, more precisely in the village of Gudurica in Vojvodina. Originally an ethnic German settlement, the Germans of the village were expelled following the capture of Gudurica by the Yugoslav Partisans. The repopulation of the settlement began in September 1945, and Slovenes, Croats, Bosniaks, Serbs, Albanians, and Macedonians were sent to colonize Gudurica. Among the Macedonians were some with Aromanian and Megleno-Romanian ethnicity. Neither ethnic group was recognized by the Yugoslav government at the time, so they were ignored not only in what is now North Macedonia, but also in Gudurica. These Aromanians and Megleno-Romanians did not have a very strong ethnic identity, so many assimilated quickly. Some Megleno-Romanians also settled in other villages in Vojvodina, but only those in Gudurica remain today. However, they represent a very small community; as of 2014, only three people spoke Megleno-Romanian in Gudurica.

== Notable figures ==
The following is a list of notable Megleno-Romanians or people of Megleno-Romanian descent.

- Petar Atanasov (born 1939), linguist from North Macedonia
- Victoria Barbă (1926–2020), animated film director in Moldova of Megleno-Romanian descent
- Ion Caramitru (1942–2021), actor and politician from Romania of Megleno-Romanian descent
- Dumitru Cerna (born 1955), politician and poet from Romania
- Dumitru Ciotti (1882/1885–1974), activist, editor and schoolteacher in Romania and the Ottoman Empire
- Virgil Coman (1973–2016), historian from Romania of Megleno-Romanian descent
- Andrey Lyapchev (1866–1933), politician in Bulgaria of Megleno-Romanian descent
- Theodor Minda (1911–1982), poet, folklorist and activist in Romania
- Constantin Noe (1883–1939), editor and professor in Romania
- Vasile Șirli (born 1948), musical composer and producer from Romania

== See also ==
- Aromanians
- Istro-Romanians
- Thraco-Roman
- Eastern Romance substratum
- Romanian language
- Origin of the Romanians
- Legacy of the Roman Empire

== Sources ==
- Kahl, Thede (2006). "The Islamisation of the Meglen Vlachs (Megleno-Romanians): The Village of Nânti (Nótia) and the "Nântinets" in Present-Day Turkey". Nationalities Papers. 34 (1): 71–90. doi:10.1080/00905990500504871. S2CID 161615853.
- Nenițescu, Ioan (1895). De la Românii din Turcia europeana: studiu etnic si statistic asupra Armânilor, cu aproape una sută de gravuri și cu o hartă etnografica (in Romanian). C. Göbl.
- Sorescu-Marinković, Annemarie; Măran, Mircea (2016). "The Meglen Vlachs (Megleno-Romanians) of Serbia: a Community on the Verge of Extinction". Res Historica. 41: 197–211. doi:10.17951/rh.2016.41.197. hdl:21.15107/rcub_dais_13913.
