= Megleno-Romanian language =

Romance language of the Balkans

Megleno-Romanian
- Meglenitic, Meglinitic, Moglenitic
- vlăhește
- Native to: Greece, North Macedonia, Romania, Turkey, Serbia
- Ethnicity: Megleno-Romanians
- Native speakers: 5,000 (2002)
- Language family: Indo-European: Italic; Latino-Faliscan; Latin; Romance; Eastern Romance; Northern or Southern Romanian? (Note: The internal classification of the Eastern Romance languages presented in Petrucci (1999) proposes a bipartite split into Northern and Southern branches, with the Southern branch splitting into Megleno-Romanian and Aromanian. By contrast, the classification presented within Glottolog v4.8 proposes a bipartite split between Aromanian and Northern Romanian, the latter of which is further split into Istro-Romanian and Eastern Romanian, from which Daco-Romanian and Megleno-Romanian are hypothesized to have split from.); Megleno-Romanian
- Early forms: Old Latin: Vulgar Latin; Proto-Romance; Common Romanian

Language codes
- ISO 639-3: ruq
- Glottolog: megl1237
- ELP: Megleno-Romanian
- Linguasphere: 51-AAD-bb
- Megleno-Romanian is classified as Severely Endangered by UNESCO Atlas of the World's Languages in Danger.

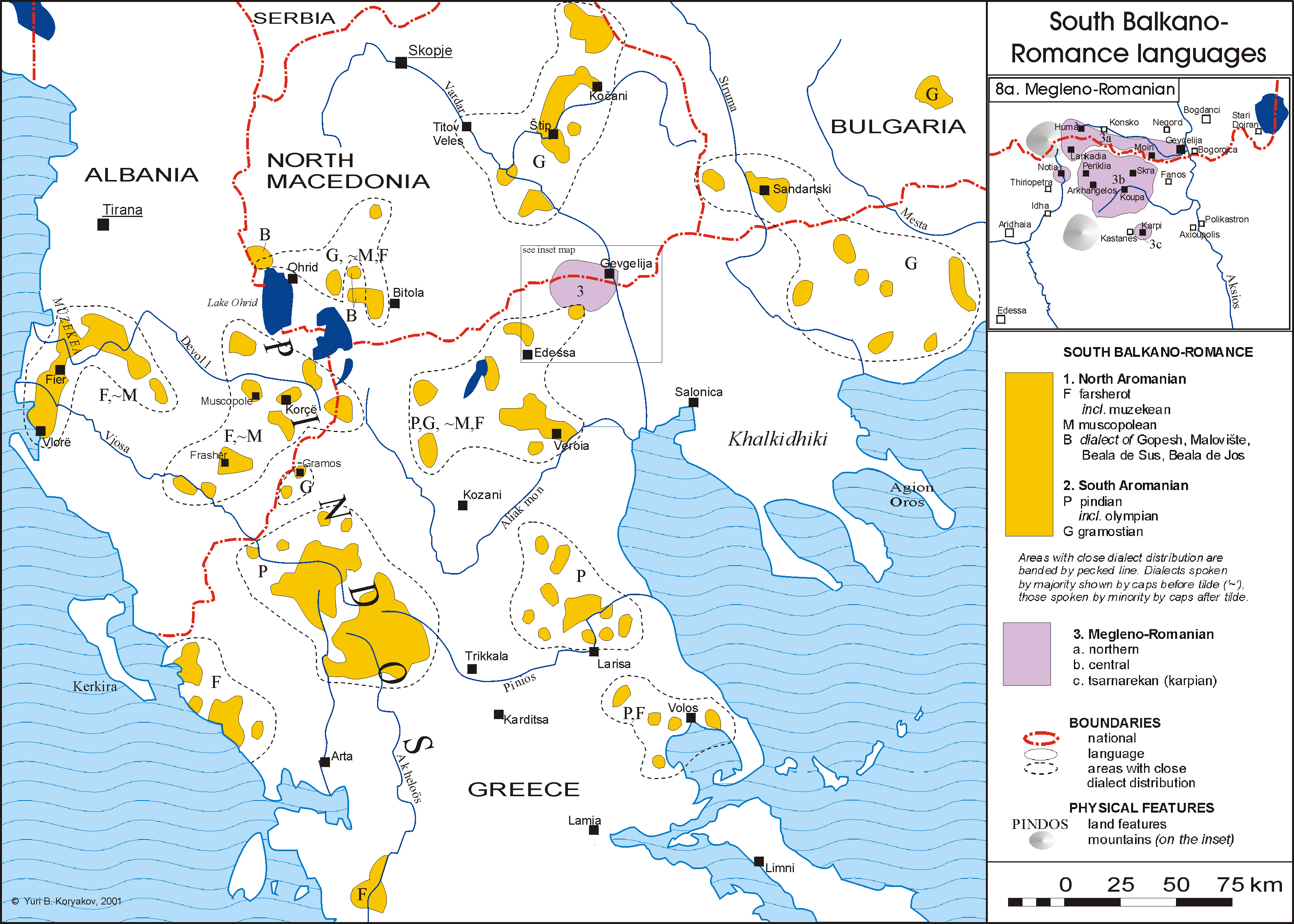
The extent of Megleno-Romanian (in purple) and Aromanian (in gold)

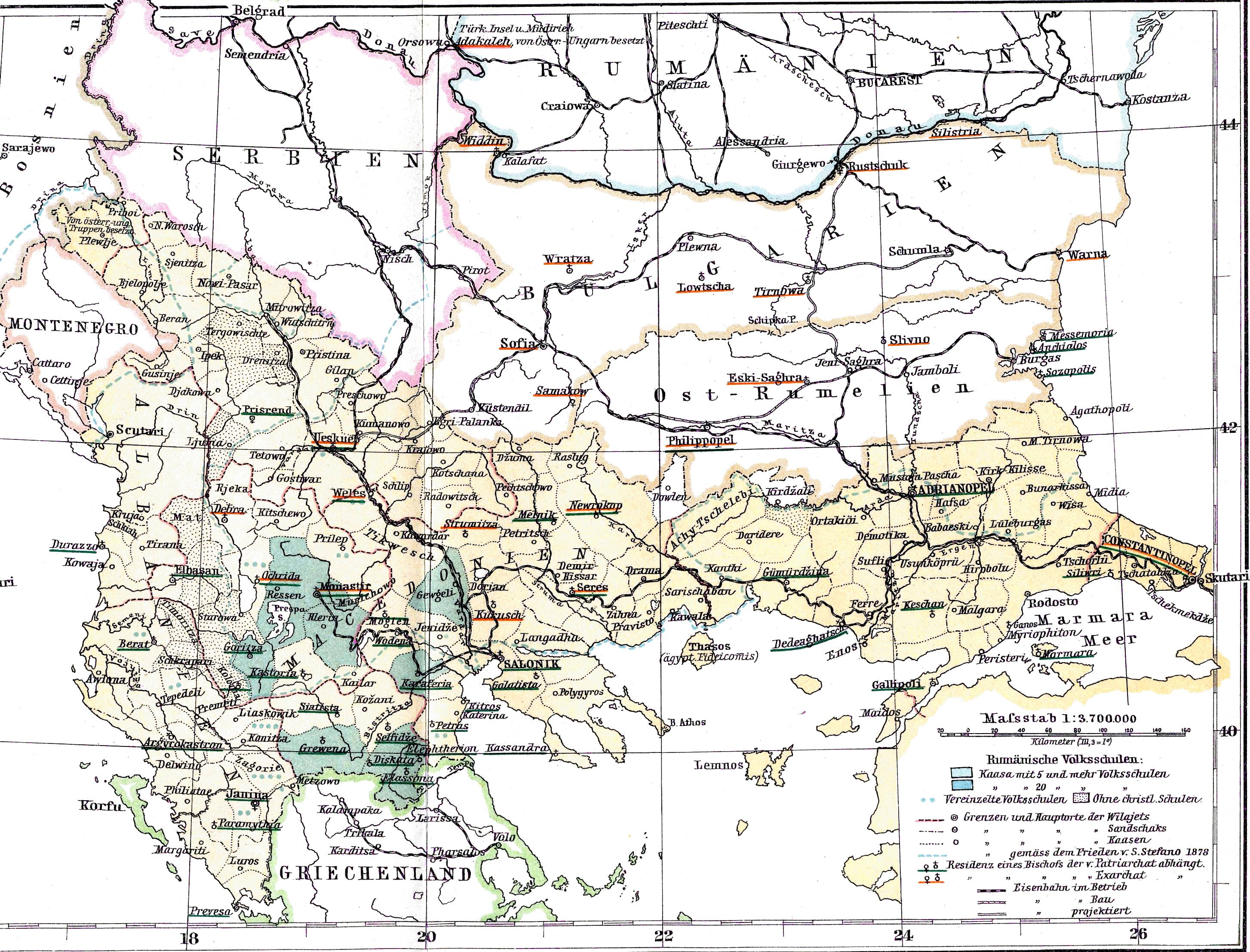
Romanian schools for Aromanians and Megleno-Romanians in the Ottoman Empire (1886)

Megleno-Romanian (known as vlăhește by its speakers, and Megleno-Romanian or Meglenitic and sometimes Moglenitic or Meglinitic by linguists) is an Eastern Romance language, similar to Aromanian. It is spoken by the Megleno-Romanians in a few villages in the Moglena region that spans the border between the Greek region of Macedonia and North Macedonia. It is also spoken by emigrants from these villages and their descendants in Romania, in Turkey by a small Muslim group, and in Serbia. It is considered an endangered language.

== Classification ==
Megleno-Romanian is a member of the family of Romance languages. More specifically, it is an Eastern Romance language, a language formed after the retreat of the Roman Empire from the Balkans. Due to the fact that it is spoken by very few people and because of its similarities with the Aromanian, modern Romanian and Istro-Romanian languages, some linguists consider it to be an intermediary between Romanian and Aromanian, often being considered either a dialect of Romanian, a dialect of Aromanian, or an independent language. It is closer to standard Romanian than the Aromanian language, suggesting that it split from Common Romanian later than Aromanian. Megleno-Romanian has been strongly influenced by the neighbouring South Slavic varieties.

== Name ==
The term Megleno-Romanian has been used by linguists (mainly Romanians), who noticed the similarity to the Romanian language. The Megleno-Romanians identify themselves as vlaș ("Vlach") or by local endonyms such as liumnicean ("from Liumnița") or umineț ("from Umă").

== Geographical distribution ==
Megleno-Romanian is spoken in several villages in the Pella and Kilkis regional units of Macedonia, Greece, as well as in a handful of villages across the border in North Macedonia. In the village of Huma, the language was spoken by most inhabitants before they and other Megleno-Romanians from the region moved in the cities of Gevgelija and Skopje where some have preserved their native language. After World War I, some Megleno-Romanians moved to Romania, in Southern Dobruja, but were moved to the village of Cerna in Tulcea County (Northern Dobruja) after the population exchange between Bulgaria and Romania. In Cerna, about 1,200 people continue to speak Megleno-Romanian. In 1940, about 30 families moved from Cerna to the Banat region of Romania in the villages of Variaș, Biled and Jimbolia. Some speakers who identified as Muslim, from the village of Nânti (Nótia), were moved to Turkey from Greece as part of the population exchange between them of the 1920s. Some also live in Serbia, specially in the village of Gudurica.

== Phonology ==
Megleno-Romanian is not a standardised language and there are phonological differences across idioms.

=== Consonants ===
		Labial	Dental/ Alveolar	Post- alveolar	Palatal	Velar	Glottal
Nasal		m	n		ɲ		
Stop	voiceless	p	t		c	k	
Stop	voiced	b	d		ɟ	ɡ	
Affricate	voiceless		t͡s	t͡ʃ			
Affricate	voiced		d͡z	d͡ʒ			
Fricative	voiceless	f	s	ʃ	ç		(h)
Fricative	voiced	v	z	ʒ			
Trill			r				
Approximant	lateral		l		ʎ		
Approximant	median				j	w	

- Sounds [h] as well as [β, ð, ɣ] can also occur from Greek borrowings.

=== Vowels ===
	Front	Central	Back
Close	i iː		u uː
Close-mid	e eː	ə	o oː
Open-mid	ɛ	ə	ɔ ɔː
Open		a aː	

Some particular phonetic characteristics of the Megleno-Romanian vowel system compared to other Eastern Romance languages are:

1. long vowels: ā, ē, ī, ǭ, ō, ū
2. use of the open-mid back rounded vowel [ɔ] in some words which in Romanian would use [ə] and [ɨ], for example: pǫ́nză
3. apheresis of [a] in initial position: aveam → veam ("we had"), aduc → duc ("I bring")

== Vocabulary ==
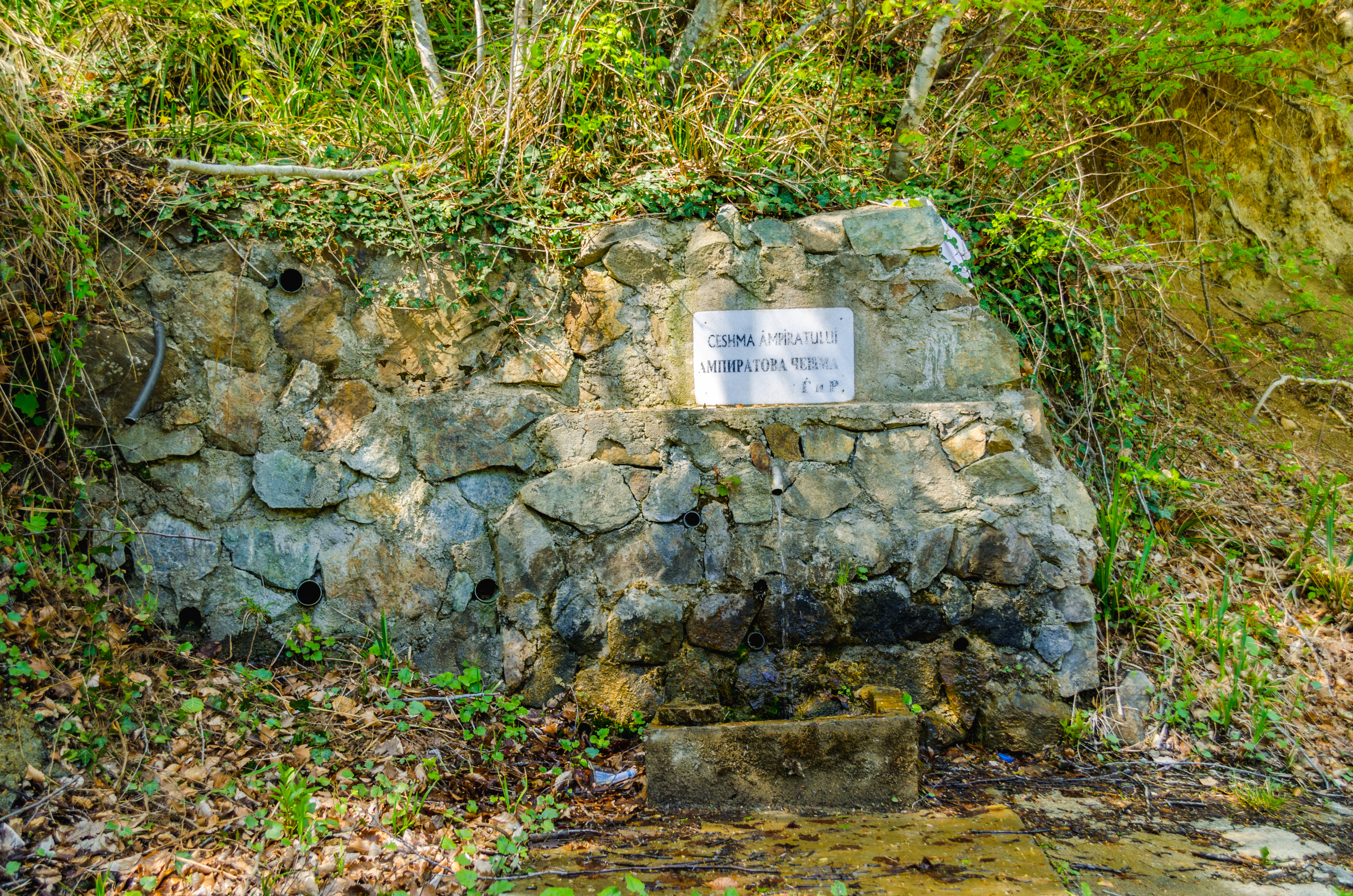
Megleno-Romanian inscription (Ceshma ămpiratului, "the Emperor's Fountain") on a water fountain along the way to Huma, a village in North Macedonia

Much of the vocabulary is of Latin origin, and much of its phonetics and semantics are shared with Aromanian and Romanian: (n.b.: MR=Megleno-Romanian, DR=Daco-Romanian, i.e. Romanian)

- basilica > MR bisearică, DR biserică (church, originally "basilica")
- lumen > MR lumi, DR lume (world, originally "light")
- monumentum > MR murmint, DR mormânt (grave, originally "monument")
- strigis > MR strig, DR strig (I yell, originally "owl")
- draco > MR drac, DR drac (devil, originally "dragon")

Megleno-Romanian also contains some words that have cognates with Albanian. These words are present in Daco-Romanian too:

- MR brad; DR brad; cf. Alb. bredh (fir tree)
- MR monz; DR mânz; cf. Alb. mës (colt)
- MR bucuros; DR bucuros; (happy) cf. Alb bukur (beautiful)

There are also some words which are of Slavic origin and which can be found in all the Eastern Romance languages:

- MR stăpân; DR trup (body); cf. Sl. trupŭ
- MR stăpon; DR stăpân (master); cf. Old Slavic. stopanŭ, today's Bulgarian stopanin and Macedonian stopan

There are a number of Byzantine and Modern Greek words, several dozens of which are also found in Daco-Romanian (Romanian language) and Aromanian and about 80 words that were borrowed via Macedonian and Bulgarian languages and other languages of the Balkans. Prior to the creation of the modern state of Greece, Megleno-Romanian borrowed very few words directly from Greek.

- Gr. prósfatos > MR proaspit; DR proaspăt (fresh)
- Gr. keramídi > MR chirămidă; DR cărămidă (brick)
- Gr. lemoni > MR limonă, via Bulg. limon (lemon); cf. DR lămâie

The most important influence on Megleno-Romanian was the East South Slavic languages, this influence being more profound than that exerted by Greek on Aromanian. Most Slavic terms are of Macedonian and Bulgarian origins. The linguist Theodor Capidan argued that the words borrowed show some phonetic features of the Bulgarian language dialect spoken in the Rhodope Mountains. There are many instances where basic words of Latin origin that can still be found in Daco-Romanian and Aromanian were replaced by Slavic words. In some cases, standard Romanian also independently borrowed the same word.

- Bulgarian (Slavic) drob > MR drob
- Bulgarian neviasta > MR niveastă (bride)
- Bulgarian gora > MR goră (forest)

== See also ==
- Istro-Romanian language
- Substrate in Romanian
- Balkan sprachbund
- Origin of the Romanians
- Thraco-Roman
- Daco-Roman
- Romance languages
- Legacy of the Roman Empire
