= Bara Venecija =

Bara Venecija Бара Венеција
- Urban neighbourhood
- Location within Belgrade
- Coordinates: 44°48′02″N 20°26′51″E
- Country: Serbia
- Region: Belgrade
- Municipality: Savski Venac
- Time zone: UTC+1 (CET)
  - Summer (DST): UTC+2 (CEST)
- Area code: +381(0)11
- Car plates: BG

Bara Venecija (Serbian Cyrillic: Бара Венеција) is an urban neighborhood of Belgrade, the capital of Serbia. It is located in Belgrade's municipality of Savski Venac, along the right bank of the Sava river.

== Location ==
Bara Venecija is located on the right bank of the Sava river, roughly between the Old Sava bridge and Branko's Bridge some 700–800 meters (0.4–0.5 mi) west of Terazije, downtown Belgrade. It is basically a small sub-neighborhood of the Savamala, which used to cover much larger area.

== History ==
The area was originally a bog called Ciganska Bara (Serbian Cyrillic: Циганска бара, "Gypsy pond"). The bog was charted for the first time in an Austrian map from 1789. It was a marsh which covered a wide area from modern Karađorđeva Street (at Kovač's Khan, at modern Hercegovačka Street) to the mouth of the Topčiderska reka into the Sava, across the northern tip of Ada Ciganlija. Marshy area covered modern location of the Belgrade Main railway station and parts of the Sarajevska and Hajduk-Veljkov Venac streets. Ciganska Bara drained two other bogs. One was located on Slavija, which drained through the creek of Vračarski Potok which flew down the area of the modern Nemanjina street. Other pond whose water drained into the Ciganska bara was Zeleni Venac.

During the high water levels in the Sava, the bog would also rise, forming a proper lake which reached the Bosanska (modern Gavrila Principa) and Sarajevska streets. Romanies who lived in the area, used the mud from the bog to make roof tiles. They lived in small huts or caravans (called čerge), between the high grass and rush, with their horses and water buffaloes grazing freely in the area. As most of the huts were actually stilt houses, built on piles due to the marshy land, the area was gradually named Bara Venecija ("Venice pond").

The concession for the construction of the first railway in Serbia included the laying of the Belgrade–Niš railway, the train bridge over the Sava river and a railway that would connect Belgrade to Zemun, a border town of Austria-Hungary at the time. The location of the future station building in Bara Venecija was chosen in 1881. The station itself was not part of the concession.

As a marshland, the selected location was completely inappropriate for construction works of any kind, so the swamp first had to be filled. The remains of the demolished Stambol Gate were already dumped into the bog in 1866. Parts of the demolished trench, šanac, which encircled the downtown, were also used to fill the bog.

The foundation stone for the station was laid by ruling prince Milan Obrenović on 15 April [O.S. 3 April] 1883. By 1884 the bog was partially drained and buried under the rubble from all parts of the city and especially from Prokop. The station was ceremonially opened 1 September [O.S. 20 August] 1884, though it wasn't completed. By September 1885 the embankment for the railway bridge on the northern end of the neighborhood, and the bridge itself, were finished, so as the embankment in the direction of the streets, with the drainage system. In 1887, city was still deliberating necessity of completely draining the bog and in 1889 decided to finish the works, announcing that works will last "for years". Filling of the bog from the Prokop was finished in 1898.

However, the drainage system in the upper sections, at Sarajevska Street, was built only in 1904. After World War I, plans were made for further filling of the area next to the railway, in order to expand cargo section of the station. As the filling and construction of the embankments wasn't finished, the area was still regularly flooded. Industrialist Mihailo V. Bajloni built a residential complex along the Sarajevska Street during Interbellum. It was constructed for the workers of the Bajloni's merchant company “Bajloni & Sons”. The complex included both the company administrative buildings and social housing.

In the early 1940, the city decided to finish the draining. On 9 March 1940, an agreement was signed with the "Danish Group" consortium, which was to pour 500,000 tons of sand on the area between the railway and the river, and from the station to the bridge. City already hired the same consortium (made up of Danish companies "Kampsax", "Højgaard & Schultz" and "Carl Nielsen") to start construction of New Belgrade, across the Sava. The "Sydhavnen" excavator was transported from Denmark, and was supposed to finish works by 1 October 1940. However, the excavator continued to work after the German occupation of Belgrade in April 1941. It finished works in 1943, completing the draining and filling of the marsh.

In 1957, the complex of Belgrade Fair was built in the southern part of Bara Venecija.

== Characteristics ==
Bara Venecija is almost entirely industrial and commercial area. Many hangars and depots, asphalt plants and oil tanks are located here, due to the proximity of both downtown Belgrade and Sava harbor (Savsko pristanište). It all gives the neighborhood industrialized, unattractive, gray look.

Being on the lowest part of the Sava's bank, Bara Venecija gets flooded during the extremely high waters of the river. It was completely flooded in 1984 and during the major flood of 2006.

=== Boiler house complex ===
The "Ložionica" complex, located within the railway station compound, includes boiler house, adjacent depot, turntable and water tower. Construction of the original depot, water stop and coal loading ramp began in 1883 on a different location, closer to the central railway building. In time they became inadequate so the new complex, designed by engineer Nikola Raičković, was finished on its present location in 1925 and became operational in 1926. The semicircular object was used for storing and placing steam locomotives on the railway. It had room for 31 locomotive and included administrative building, blacksmith shop, sawmill, repair shops, foundry and gas factory. The water tower was demolished during World War II and rebuilt later. It was claimed that Milutin Milanković drafted the designs for the original water tower, but it can't be proved.

The complex was placed under the preliminary protection as the cultural monument and became dispatched ward of the Railway Museum where locomotives from the 19th century were exhibited. Already in bad shape, after the construction of Belgrade Waterfront began and the Main Railway station was closed, the security was removed from the complex. A month later, in late August 2018, a group of people undetected for days and using gas burners, cut and destroyed two priceless locomotives ("Pula" from 1864 and "Presek" from 1884), hand cast railway wagon, seven planes and two vertical drills. The larceny lasted for days even though the police station is almost across the complex before it was noticed. Remainder of the exhibits was subsequently relocated.

By February 2020, the already crumbling depot was partially buried under the piles of earth deposited from the construction site. Remains of four rusting wagons remained within the complex and there were some squatters despite everything was covered in overgrowth of ailanthus. According to the Belgrade Waterfront project, the complex should be adapted into the "modern and creative space" in 2020. In August 2021, the government announced architectural design competition for the future "creative-innovative multi-functional center", the "hub of creative industry". The structure will cover 14,000 square metres (150,000 sq ft) and the construction is planned to start in June 2022.

Futuristic design was unveiled in November 2021, with projected deadline in 2024. Design by "AKVS Architecture" studio includes the central plateau, boiler room transformed into arched gallery with 26 revolving doors, and new building with forested terraces and oxygen bubble with microalgae based photobioreactors. Works began in February 2023, and the deadline was moved to the spring of 2025.

=== Cardboard factory of Milan Vapa ===
Industrialist and philanthropist Milan Vapa (1875-1939) established his cardboard and paper business in 1905 but decided to build a new, proper factory as the business expanded. He built a modern factory between the Senjak neighborhood and the Sava river from 1921 to 1924. Designed by Karl Hanisch, the Cardboard Factory of Milan Vapa was located next to the Old Railway Bridge, had its own pier, water pump, power plant and railway branch, electric crane, ambulance, chapel. The paper mill was equipped with the moderns German machines. It was the first industrial object built purposely for the paper production in Serbia and was the only one in the next 30 years. The factory was nationalized after World War II by the new Communist authorities and in the 1950s the machines were dismantled and relocated to Ada Huja.

Former factory became the administrative building and the storage of the "Jugošped" company, a major freight forwarder and logistics company. The industrial complex was placed under the state protection. By the 2010s, "Jugošped" collapsed. Strong wind blew away part of the tin roof in the late 2019. When Institute for the protection of the cultural monuments wanted to contact the owner to fix it, all possible proprietors and leaseholders, including those named as such in the official papers (companies "Jugošped" and "Zepter", City of Belgrade, Republic of Serbia) denied the ownership. The roof was fixed but it is not known by whom.

As of February 2020, part of the building is almost buried under tons of earth from the nearby construction site of Belgrade Waterfront.

=== Post Office No. 6 ===
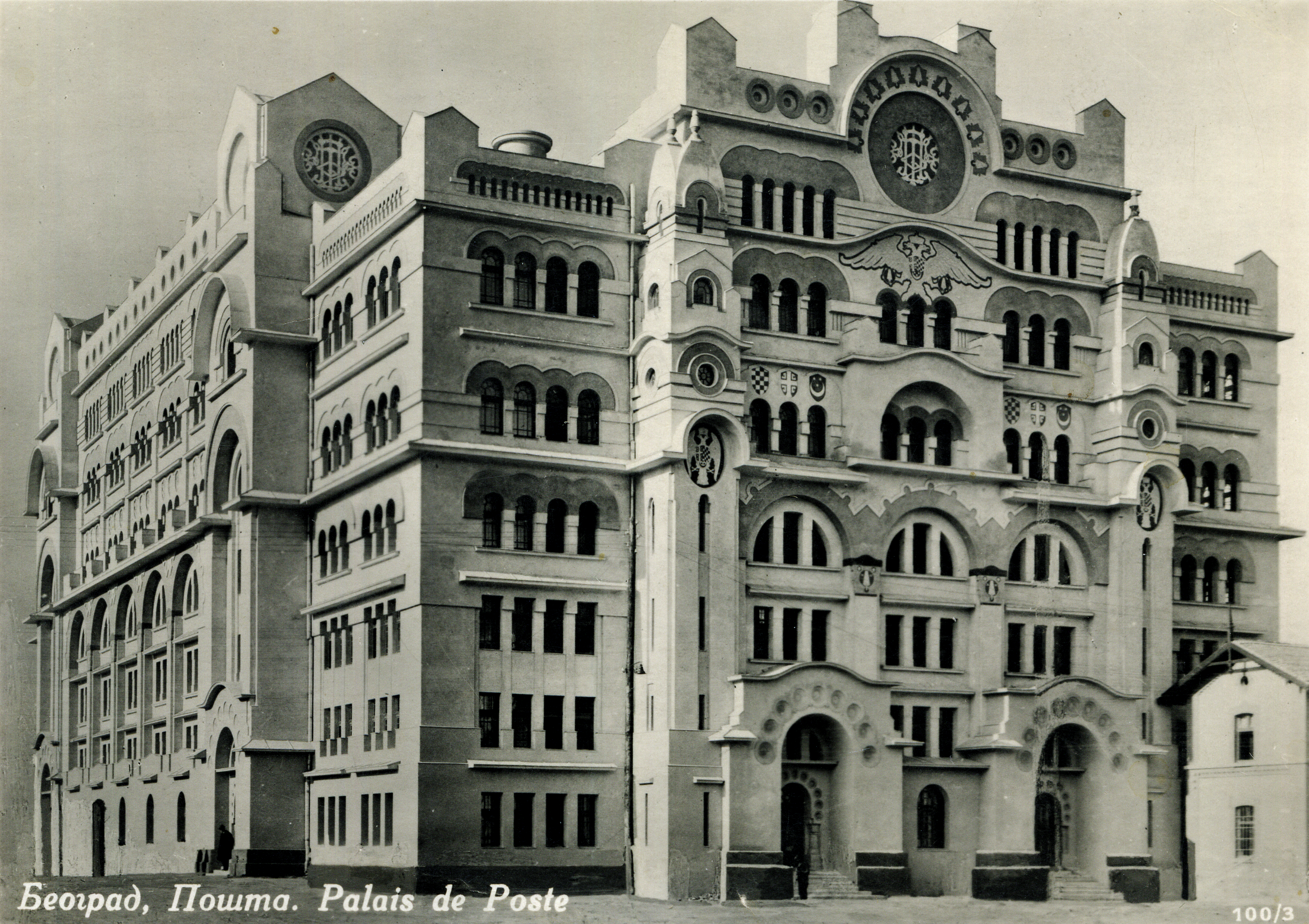
Original 1920s facade

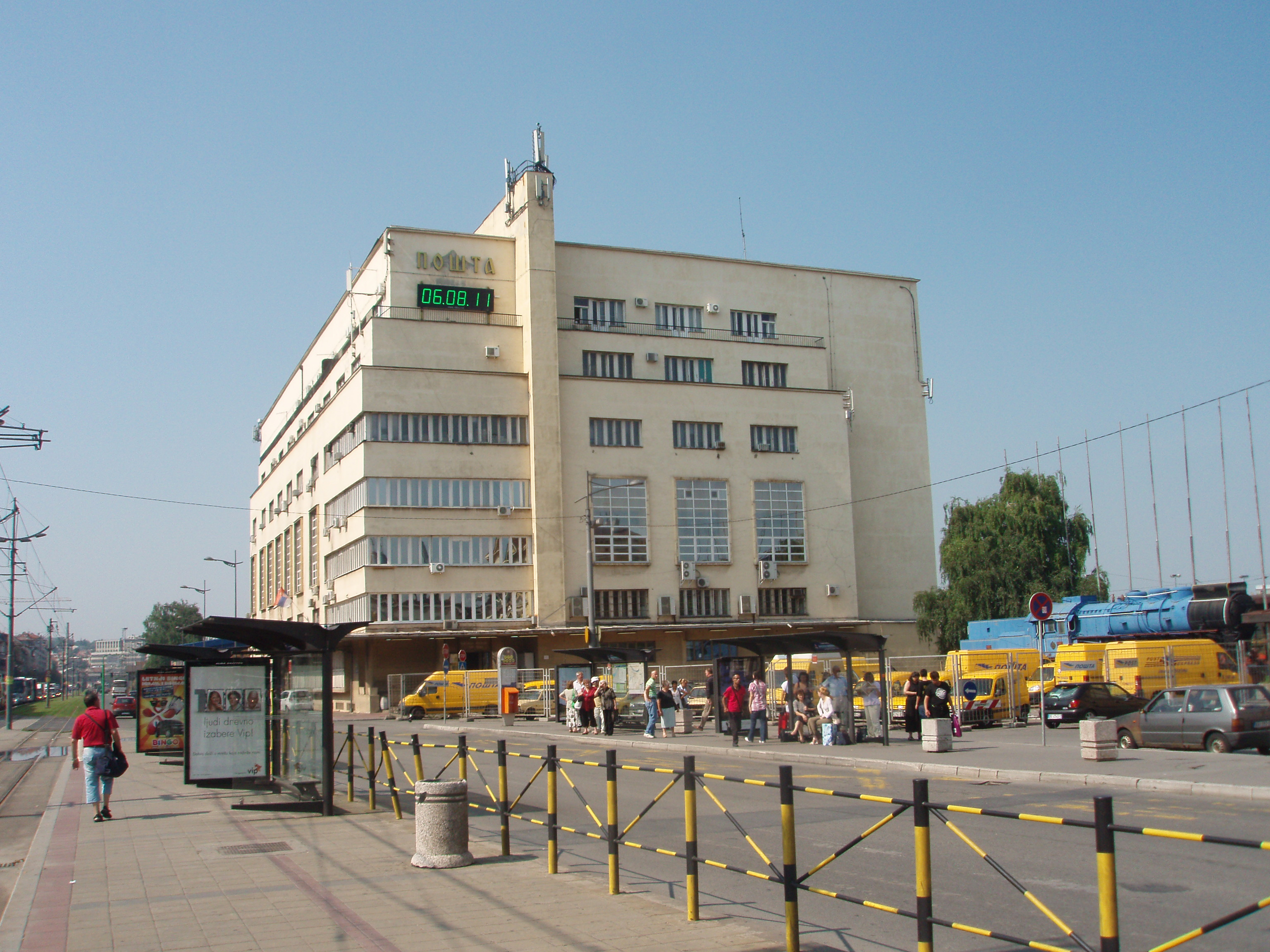
Post office in 2011

Just south of the railway station, there is a building of the Post Office No. 6. Originally built as the Post Office No. 2 in the 1920s, it was constructed by architect Momir Korunović. Due to the extravagantly ornamented façade, it was called "architectural beauty" and considered one of the most beautiful buildings in Belgrade and among Korunović's best works. It was damaged during World War II and reconstructed later. However, the new, Communist authorities considered its façade "too bourgeois" so they removed the remains of the façade and reconstructed only the skeletal architecture under it, which suited the style of the Socialist realism which was pushed by the government in the immediate post-war period. As such, the façade has been described as a "skeleton and unsightly". Ukrainian émigré architect, and informant of the OGPU (later NKVD), Pavel Krat, was given the task of reducing the façade to the basic social realistic style. He referred to the Korunović's design as the "typical example of unsuccessful use of our folk architectural heritage, overloaded with stylish elements".

With the construction of the Belgrade Waterfront since the mid-2010s, and the complete overhaul of the Sava Square, there were signals from the city and the investors, both for the restoration of the original, rich façade and for keeping the present appearance of the building. National postal service, Pošta Srbije, announced it has no further need for the building, so the state, which is the official owner of the object, decided to sell it, foreseeing it might be adapted into the hotel. One of the bidding conditions will be the restoration of the old façade. In February 2020, deputy mayor Goran Vesić announced the restoration of the original façade, after the reshaping of the Sava Square is finished.

Despite previous claims, in May 2020 it was announced that the building won't be restored to its pre-World War II appearance. City claimed the full reconstruction will be financially imprudent as the building lost its original structure. Instead, the architectural design competition will be organized in 2021, with the task of incorporating "authentic elements" of the original façade. The building was the last in the line of projects where city administration promised to reconstruct city landmarks to its old appearances, but instead mostly just refurbished them (Belgrade Main railway station, Belgrade Cooperative, National Museum of Serbia). After negative public backlash (pointing out to other cities which restore their landmarks like Berlin, Budapest or Warsaw, and to the lack of proper explanations why the reconstruction is not an option), chief city urbanist Marko Stojčić stated a month later that the original façade will be restored.

In May 2021 city announced that artists and other tenants from the BIGZ building might move into the building after the reconstruction, if city decides to adapt it into the cultural center. When the contract for the Belgrade Waterfront was signed in 2015, the post office building was handed over to the investors from the United Arab Emirates to adapt into the commercial building, but without obligation for the investor to restore the original facade. City announced possible agreement with the investors to still finance the building's reconstruction into the cultural center, offering them tax rebates. By this time, the Post Office mostly evacuated the building.

Situation changed again in June 2022, when city announced that the old building will be completely demolished, and the new one, replica of the old, Korunović's design, will be built from scratch. New building will host City Library, and evening stage of the Theatre "Boško Buha". Construction will be financed by the Belgrade Waterfront company, which will then handed it over to Belgrade. A large parking lot will be built behind the building.

=== Pyramidal bunkers ===
Along the tracks and the Savska Street, German occupational forces built four bunkers in 1941–1942, during the World War II occupation. They were built in an unusual, not often applied, four-side pyramidal design. This way, the bombs wouldn't hit it directly, instead they would slide or bounce of its sloped sides. The bunkers were built of concrete, with very thick walls and were quite spacious inside. They were used by the railway workers but also by the Wehrmacht military crews which protected the railway and used bunkers during the air raids. One bunker was closer to the street while the other was closer to the river. The river one was smaller, but had an interior equipped for the prolonged stay of the soldiers, including quite efficient ventilation system and toilet. The larger one had 80 m^{2} (860 sq ft) of usable space. It was 2.2 m (7 ft 3 in) tall on the inside and the walls were 3 m (9.8 ft) thick at the base. It was divided in two shelters, 27 m (89 ft) and 14 m (46 ft) long, and could shelter 50 people.

There is a total of 27 known German bunkers which survived until the 2010s, including two pyramidal ones in Bara Venecija. The street bunker was used as a storage facility for years, before it was adapted into the small kafana for the railway workers. In time, it became hiding place for the homeless and the waste dealers. As both bunkers were on the location of the controversial Belgrade Waterfront project, they were scheduled for demolition, despite the ideas of turning them into cultural or exhibition spaces, which is usually done with such objects in European cities. The river bunker was demolished in 2015 and the street one in August 2019.
