= Old Post Office (Belgrade, Serbia) =

Former building in Belgrade, Serbia

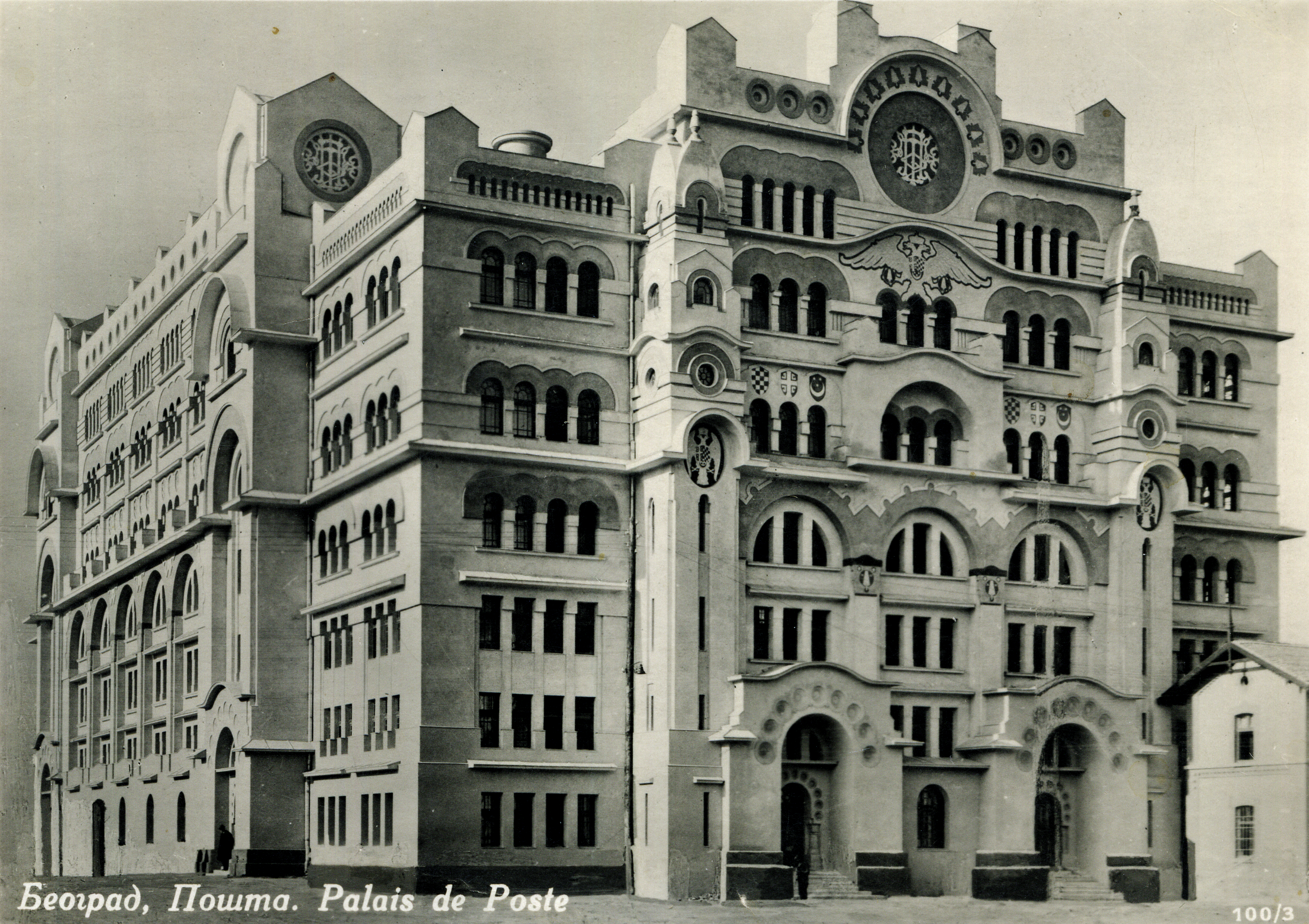
- Old Post Office
- Interactive map of the Old Post Office area

General information
- Status: Demolished (January 2025), replica currently being rebuilt
- Type: Post office (1929–2023), Future cultural center and library
- Architectural style: Serbo-Byzantine Revival (1929–1947, 2025–present), Functionalism (1947–2025)
- Location: Palilula, 2, Savska street, Belgrade, Kingdom of Yugoslavia
- Coordinates: 44.8073°N 20.4550°E
- Opened: 1929
- Renovated: 1947 (reconstructed)
- Demolished: 1944 (heavily damaged), 2025 (completely demolished)

Design and construction
- Architects: Momir Korunović, Pavel Krat

The Old Post Office (Serbian: Стара пошта, romanized: Stara pošta), is a former building in Belgrade, modern-day Serbia. Located next to Belgrade Main railway station, it was considered to be one of the most beautiful buildings and symbols of the city. Built in Serbo-Byzantine Revival style upon plans by Momir Korunović, Post Office was mostly destroyed by Allied bombing of Yugoslavia in World War II and later reconstructed in 1947 in a functionalist style.

== Location ==
The building is located just south of the Belgrade Main railway station, in the southern corner of the Sava Square, at 2 Savska Street. It is situated in the neighborhood of Bara Venecija, or the extreme south extension of Savamala. Being at the beginning of the Savska Street, it is across the Saint Sava Hospital, while the Monument to Stefan Nemanja and pedestrian section of the Ssva Square are to the northeast.

== History ==
=== Origin ===
Built as the Post Office No. 2 in the 1920s, it was constructed by architect Momir Korunović, nicknamed Serbian Gaudi. Due to the extravagantly ornamented façade, it was described as "architectural beauty", and considered one of the most beautiful buildings in Belgrade, but also being among Korunović's best works. It was damaged during World War II and had to be reconstructed.

=== 1947 reconstruction ===
However, the new, Communist authorities considered its façade "too bourgeois" so they removed the remains of the façade and reconstructed only the skeletal architecture under it, which suited the style of the Socialist realism which was pushed by the government in the immediate post-war period. As such, the façade has been described as a "skeleton and unsightly". Ukrainian émigré architect, and informant of the OGPU (later NKVD), Pavel Krat, was given the task of reducing the façade to the basic social realistic style. He referred to the Korunović's design as the "typical example of unsuccessful use of our folk architectural heritage, overloaded with stylish elements". The name was also changed to Post Office No. 6.

=== 21st century ===
With the construction of the Belgrade Waterfront since the mid-2010s, and the complete overhaul of the Sava Square, there were signals from the city and the investors, both for the restoration of the original, rich façade and for keeping the present appearance of the building. National postal service, Pošta Srbije, announced it has no further need for the building, so the state, which is the official owner of the object, decided to sell it, foreseeing it might be adapted into the hotel. One of the bidding conditions will be the restoration of the old façade. In February 2020, deputy mayor Goran Vesić announced the restoration of the original façade, after the reshaping of the Sava Square is finished.

Despite previous claims, in May 2020 it was announced that the building won't be restored to its pre-World War II appearance. City claimed the full reconstruction will be financially imprudent as the building lost its original structure. Instead, the architectural design competition will be organized in 2021, with the task of incorporating "authentic elements" of the original façade. The building was the last in the line of projects where city administration promised to reconstruct city landmarks to its old appearances, but instead mostly just refurbished them (Belgrade Main railway station, Belgrade Cooperative, National Museum of Serbia). After negative public backlash (pointing out to other cities which restore their landmarks like Berlin, Budapest or Warsaw, and to the lack of proper explanations why the reconstruction is not an option), chief city urbanist Marko Stojčić stated a month later that the original façade will be restored. In March 2021 the post office within the building was closed, thus vacating half of the building.

In May 2021 city announced that artists and other tenants from the BIGZ building might move into the building after the reconstruction, if city decides to adapt it into the cultural center. When the contract for the Belgrade Waterfront was signed in 2015, the post office building was handed over to the investors from the United Arab Emirates to adapt into the commercial building, but without obligation for the investor to restore the original facade. City announced possible agreement with the investors to still finance the building's reconstruction into the cultural center, offering them tax rebates. By this time, the Post Office mostly evacuated the building.

Situation changed again in June 2022, when city announced that the old building will be completely demolished, and the new one, replica of the old, Korunović's design, will be built from scratch. New building will host City Library, and evening stage of the Theatre "Boško Buha". Construction will be financed by the Belgrade Waterfront company, which will then handed it over to Belgrade. A large parking lot will be built behind the building. In January 2023, it was announced that the restored edifice will be opened in early 2025. It was still not decided whether the two outer walls facing the Savska Street will be preserved, or everything will be demolished and fully rebuilt. The building will make a complex with the former railway station, which will be adapted into the Historical Museum of Serbia, and the new school and kindergarten buildings planned behind the post office, within the Belgrade Waterfront project. Former post office should also host an interactive children's museum, a library, restaurant and coffeehouse.

In March 2023 the Boško Buha theatre ensemble went to protest as they were informed the entire theatre will be relocated from the Republic Square, where it has been since the foundation in 1950 and has indefinite lease right. Problem turned out to be the ownership in the cadaster, which was explained to the ensemble being a mistake which will be corrected, and that the theatre will not move. It was then announced that the new building will be a cultural center, with additional galleries, artistic workshops, art schools, and bookstores. City urbanist Stojčić also said that there will be a theater in the building, but it is still unknown which one. The building was emptied by the mid-September, and demolition began by the end of November 2023. Despite claimed cultural purpose of the building, the "commercial content will dominate".

== Gallery ==
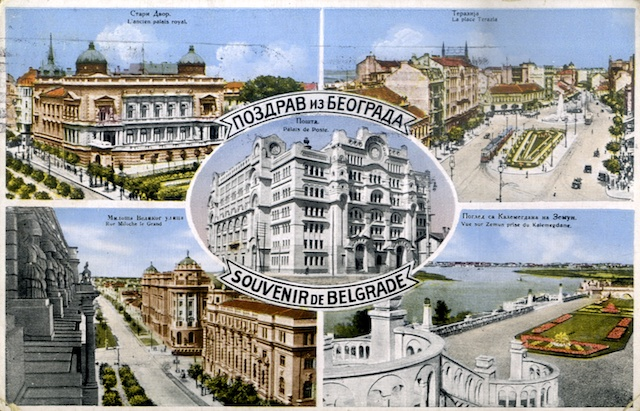
Old postcard from Belgrade

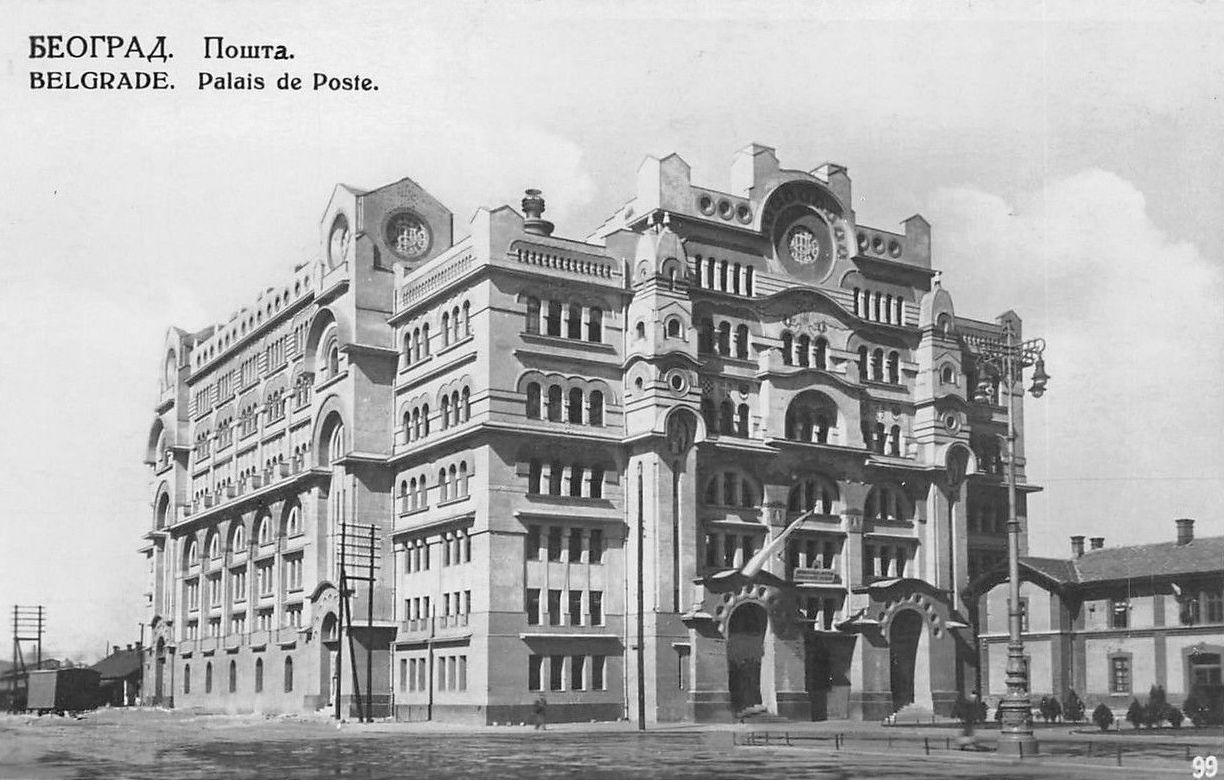
Old Post office

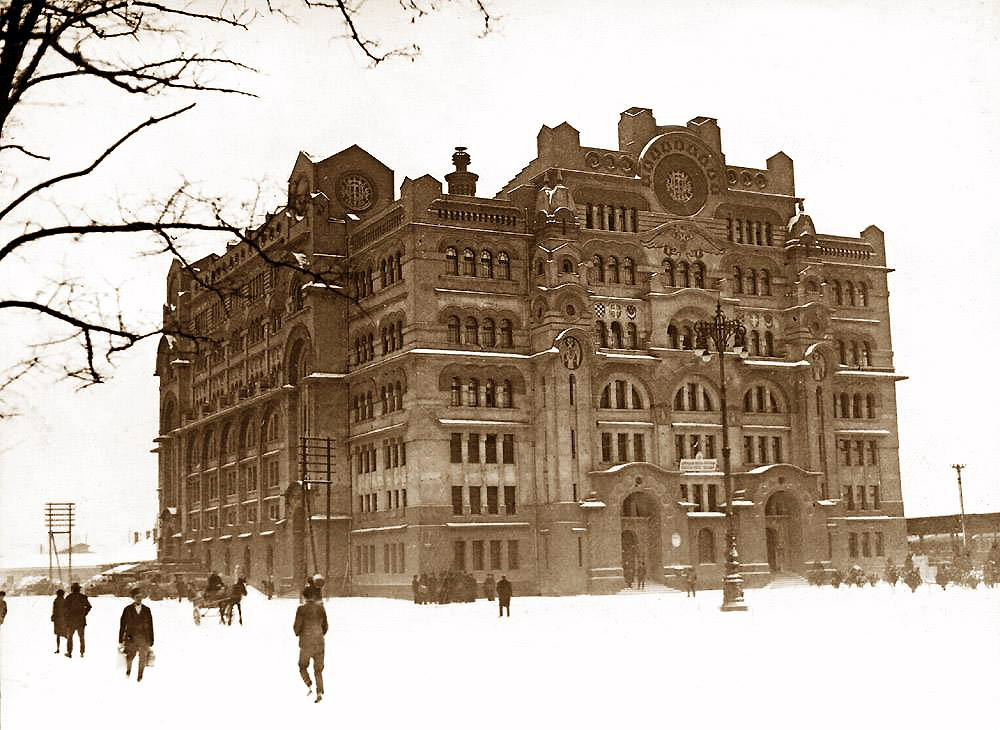
Old Post office during winter

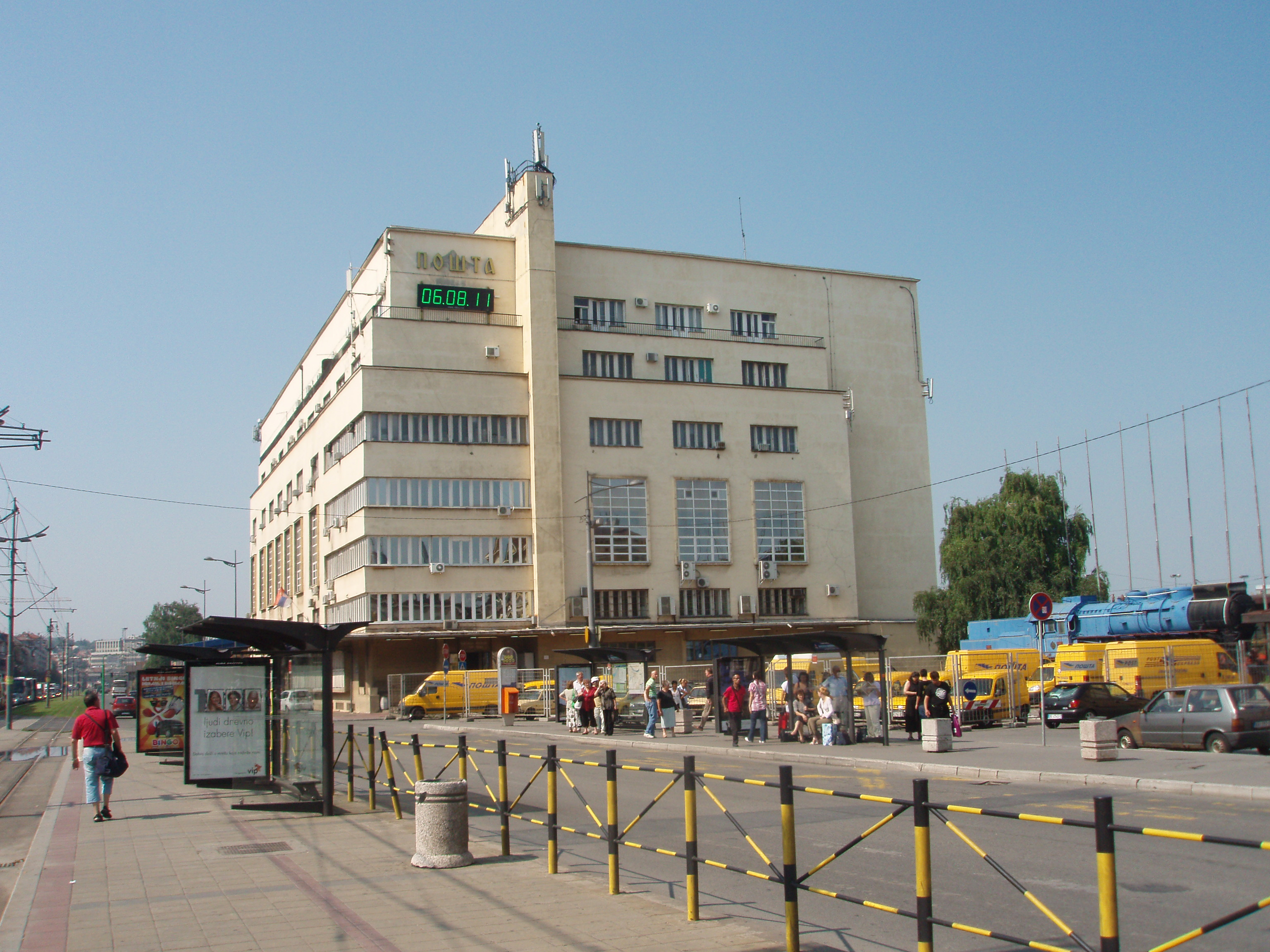
Reconstructed Old Post office (1947—2023)

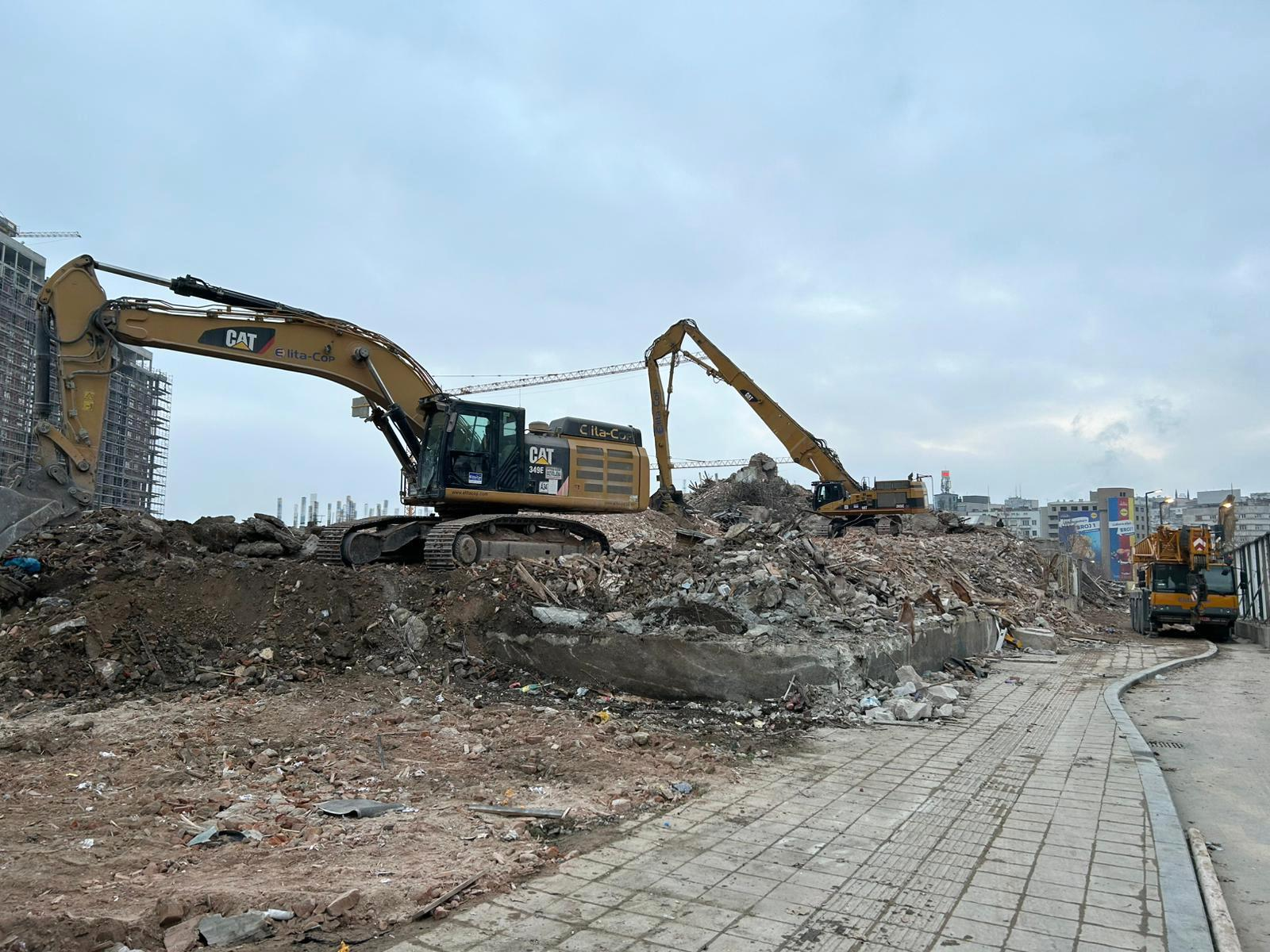
The Remains of the Old Post Office ruins, Belgrade (2025)
