= Republic Square (Belgrade) =

Republic Square Трг републике
- Urban neighbourhood
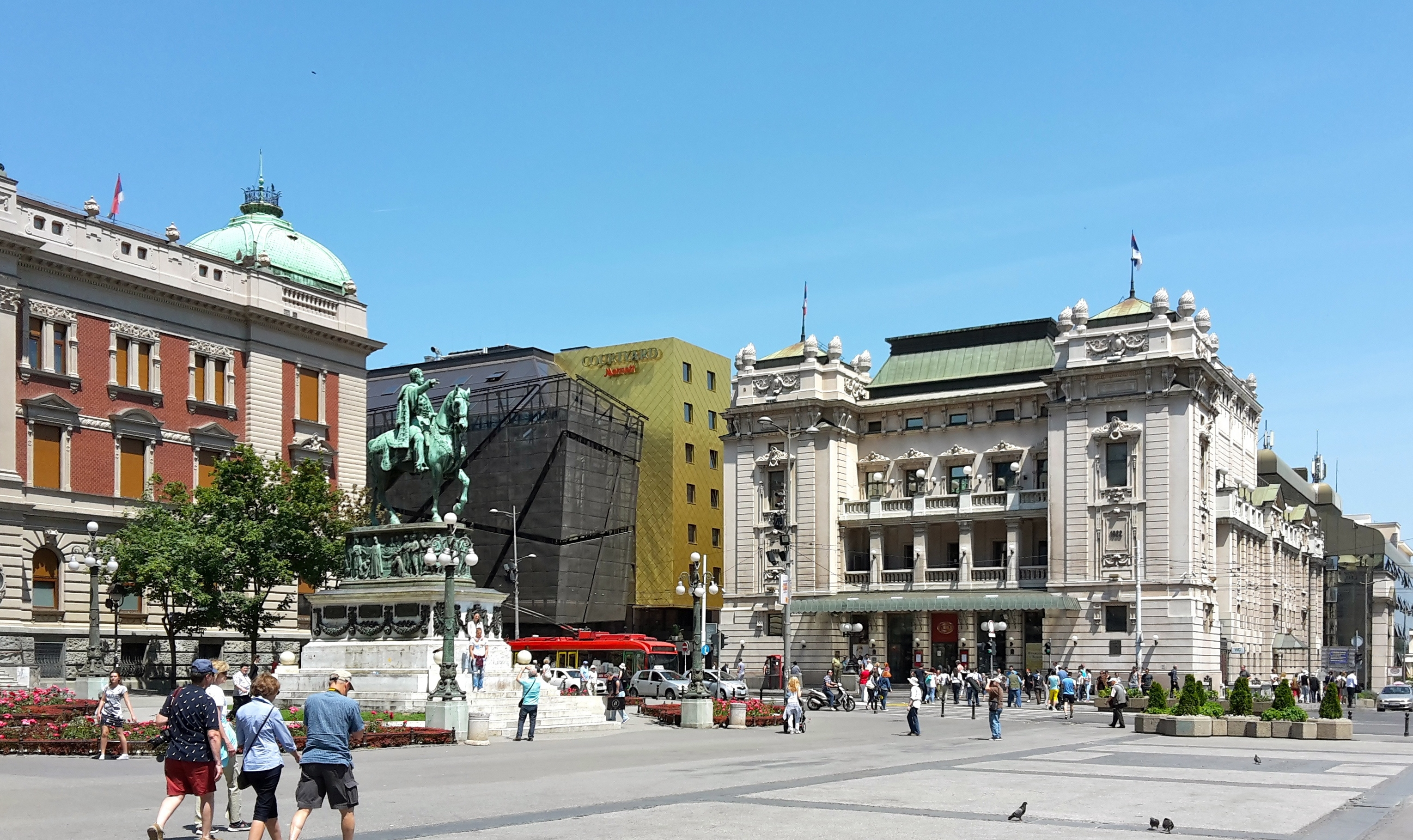
- Republic Square with the statue of Prince Mihailo

- Location within Belgrade
- Coordinates: 44°48′59.2″N 20°27′36.4″E
- Country: Serbia
- Region: Belgrade
- Municipality: Stari Grad
- Time zone: UTC+1 (CET)
  - Summer (DST): UTC+2 (CEST)
- Area code: +381(0)11
- Car plates: BG

The Republic Square or the Square of the Republic (Serbian: Трг републике, Trg republike) is one of the central town squares and an urban neighborhood of Belgrade, located in the Stari Grad municipality. It is the site of some of Belgrade's most recognizable public buildings, including the National Museum, the National Theatre and the statue of Prince Michael.

== Location ==
The square is located less than 100 meters away from Terazije, designated center of Belgrade, to which it is connected by the streets of Kolarčeva (traffic) and Knez Mihailova (pedestrian zone). Many people erroneously consider Square of the Republic to be the center of the city. Through Vasina street it is connected to the fortress and park of Kalemegdan to the west and through Sremska street it is connected to the neighborhood of Zeleni Venac and further to Novi Beograd. It also borders the neighborhoods of Stari Grad and Dorćol, to the north. Today, it makes one of the local communities within Belgrade with a population of 2,360 in 2002.

== Name ==
The name of the square has been the subject of much debate in the city. Vuk Drašković of the Serbian Renewal Movement suggested the square be renamed to Freedom Square (Трг Слободе / Trg Slobode) after pro-democracy demonstrations were held in the square to oust Slobodan Milosević on 9 March 1991, during the 1991 protests in Belgrade. Most recently, a group of theater academics suggested the square's original name Theater Square (Позоришни Трг / Pozorišni trg) be returned.

== History ==
=== Antiquity ===
The Celtic and Roman predecessor of Belgrade was Singidunum. Castrum occupied part of today's Belgrade Fortress but the civilian zone spread from the Kralja Petra Street, over both the Sava and Danube slopes, till Kosančićev Venac, extending in a series of necropolises from Republic Square, along the Bulevar kralja Aleksandra all the way to the Mali Mokri Lug. Necropolis at Republic Square contained a well-shaped graves from the 1st century AD. In general, the largest section of the civilian settlement was situated between the modern Simina (Dorćol) and Brankova streets (Zeleni Venac, Kosančićev Venac), and the Republic Square.

During the digging of the foundations for the Monument to Prince Michael in 1882, tombs from different periods of Roman rule were discovered. One tomb was made from bricks, and there were 13 circular and 2 rectangle grave pits. Some of them are "well-tombs", named so because they are more than 10 m (33 ft) deep. The "well-tombs" are rare in these areas and it is believed that the custom arrived from Gaul. The brick tomb, which contained rushlight, was discovered close to the Čika Ljubina Street, while the other pits were where the monument is today. The materials found in the tombs include pottery fragments and vessels, pieces of terracotta and stone statues, fan-shaped floor tiles, bronze and bone needles, bricks, rushlights, etc. The pits were filled with ashes and contained animal bones. Coins and bronze rings, parts of the armor, have also been discovered. These "well-tombs" are considered to be the oldest part of the vast Singidunum necropolis, originating from c.100 AD, while the brick tomb is dated to c.400 and some of its bricks have a stamp of the Legio IV Flavia Felix. The entire square area belongs to the Archaeological Site of Singidunum, which was declared a protected zone on 30 June 1964. During the 2018–2019 renovation, two additional, though devastated tombs were discovered.

=== Baroque Belgrade ===
During their occupation of northern Serbia from 1717 to 1739, the Austrians conducted massive project of extensive refurbishment of Belgrade from an oriental town into the modern, baroque-style, European one. Major section was the German Town, modern Dorćol, where large-scale settlement of ethnic Germans ensued. In the next two decades the goal was mostly achieved, and the historians today refer to this part of city's history as Baroque Belgrade. Project included construction of several imposing objects, some of which were located in the area of modern square, which was on the outskirts of German Town.

After Austria lost the Austro-Turkish War of 1737–1739, the northern Serbia, including Belgrade, was returned to the Turks. One of the provisions of the 1739 Treaty of Belgrade stated that Austria had to demolish all the fortifications and military and civilian building it has constructed during the occupation. Many baroque buildings were demolished, however, Austrians didn't demolish the buildings outside of the Belgrade Fortress' walls, so the Ottomans destroyed them and almost completely re-orientalized Belgrade.

==== Württemberg Gate ====
The Württemberg Gate was built in 1725. It predated the construction of the protective trench built on the orders by the Generalissimo Ernst Gideon von Laudon. It was one of the four gates which lead outside of the fortress and was part of the fortification's outer walls. The gate was a typical baroque gate of its day. It was designed by Nicolas Doxat, who renovated the entire fortress during the Austrian period. His task was to project the new walls and ramparts system around the city, to develop a completely new grid of streets and the transform Belgrade into the typical baroque town. The final completed section of the inner fortified system was the Württemberg Gate. Other three gates were located in the modern Cara Dušana Street (Imperial Gate), Pop-Lukina Street and along the Sava river.

The basic layout of the entire fortified system was finished by 1737. That year, another Austro-Turkish war broke out and the works on further fortification were stopped. After being defeated in the Battle of Grocka in July 1739, Austria agreed to sign a truce. As stipulated by the Treaty of Belgrade in 1739, Austrians had to withdraw and they insisted to demolish all objects and fortifications within the Belgrade Fortress, built in the period of their rule. In June 1740, on a boat in the middle of the Sava river, which now became border between Austria and Ottoman Empire again, an agreement was signed and the fortress, including the gates was demolished. The remains of the gate were found during the 1958 digging of the foundations for the "Press House". The remains of the walls and foundations were re-discovered during the 2018 reconstruction and showed no evidence of additional works and reconstructions after it was built.

The gate was named after Charles Alexander, Duke of Württemberg, who was Austrian governor of occupied Serbia from 1720 to 1733. His court and military barrack were located right behind the gate, at the very entrance into the fort. The National Theatre is today located on that spot. From descriptions, it is known that it was much larger and more monumental than the latter Stambol Gate, but there are no surviving illustrations so the exact appearance of the gate is unknown.

==== Württemberg Palace ====
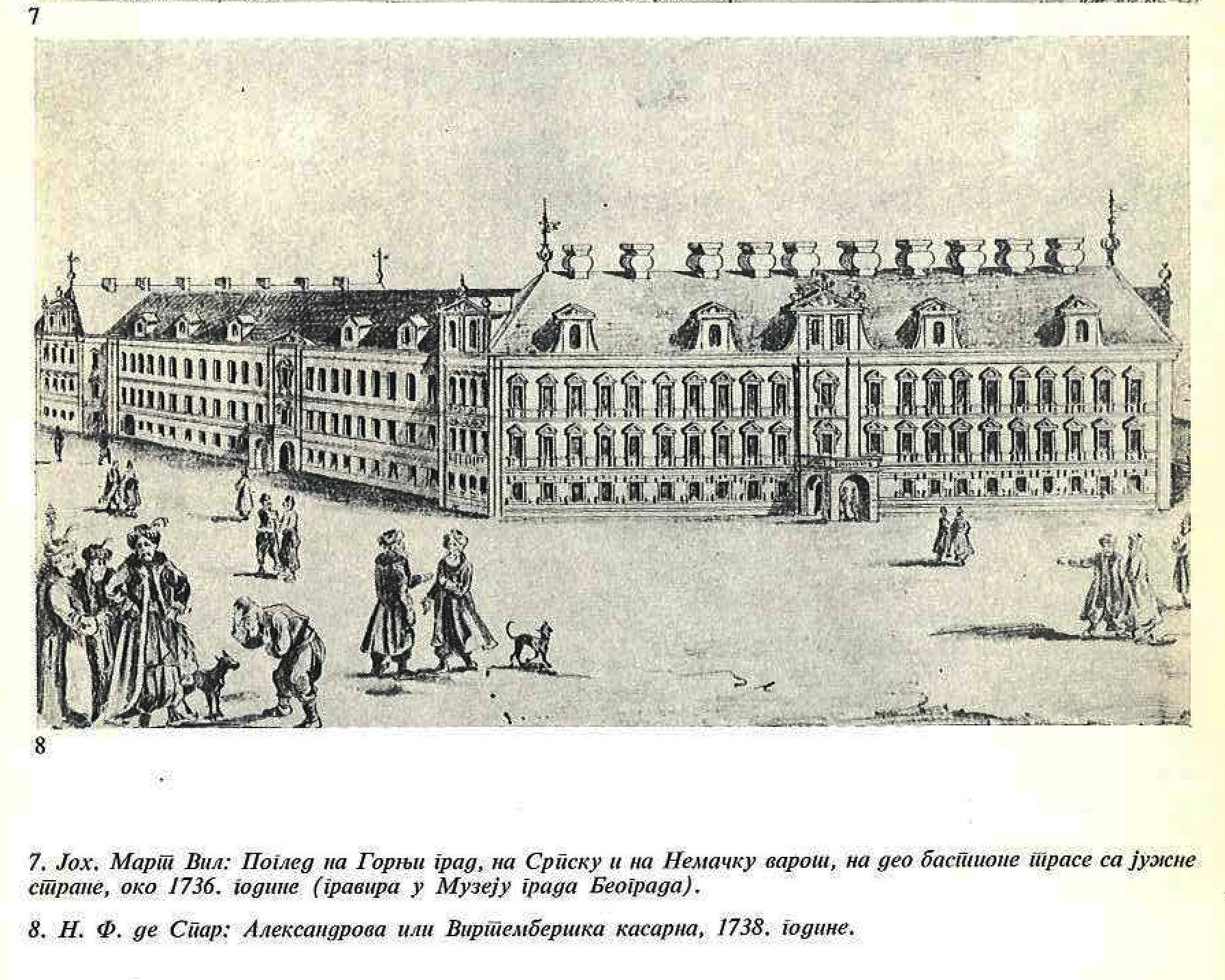
The 1738 engraving of the palace of Duke of Württemberg, Austrian governor of Serbia

Württemberg also ordered construction of the massive building, stretching over several blocks, which occupied the area between the German and Serbian sections of Belgrade. Originally intended to be a military barrack, after Württemberg's direction it was vastly expanded into his palace, or court. The palace occupied the area between the modern Ruski car Tavern, Zmaj Jovina Street and Republic Square. On one of its narrower side, where the "Jadran" cinema was located for decades, it faced the Württemberg Gate. On the other side it also faced a square, which was designated for the musters.

The palace had rectangular base and was vertically divided into ground floor, two storeys and Mansard roof. As the original purpose of the edifice was military one, the facade is ornamented in the style of plainer, classical baroque. The narrower sides were decorated more. The longer sides were divided in three avant-corps, one central and two flanks. The central avant-corps, or risalit, was especially enhanced with decorative elements, on all four facades. Also, all four had balcony porch, under which all four entrances into the building were located. The upper outline of the building ended with highly elevated roof and plump chimneys, which was typical for the Austrian architecture of the day.

Later Serbian folk songs said the palace had "windows as many as there are days in the year". However, after the examinations of the surviving images, that number was established to be around 312 rather than 365. Württemberg also formed something of the first zoo in Belgrade. He ordered his military to capture and bring to him "wild beasts from the forests and mountains of Serbia", which he then kept in cages.

After the Austrians withdrew in 1739, the local Ottoman administration sent a letter to the Sublime Porte asking for the "large masonry saray for the wālis to be demolished. Even before the reply came from Constantinople, local administration mined the building and leveled it to the ground. Partial remains of the palace were discovered during the 2018-2019 reconstruction. The building is today considered one of the most representative Belgrade edifices in the entire 18th century. Digital archaeological 3D representation of the building was finished in 2020.

=== Stambol Gate ===
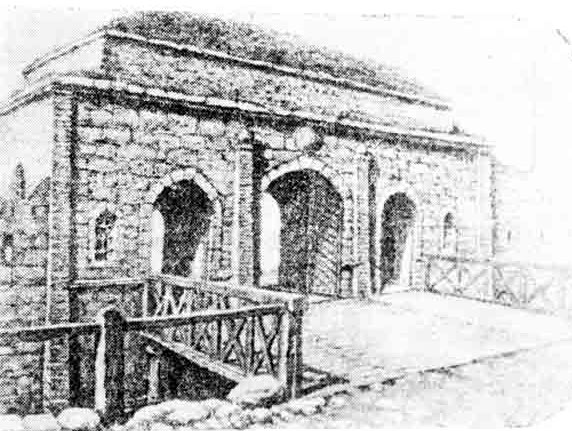
Stambol Gate

After entering Belgrade in 1740, the Ottomans found completely destroyed ramparts. They walled the remaining earthen defensive mounds with palisades. The Ottomans decided to build only one gate, while on the other access points they set čardaks. They didn't use the foundations of the demolished Württemberg Gate, but built their gate a bit to the right, where the modern Vasina Street is, so the gate occupied the area between the modern National Theatre and the Monument to Prince Michael.

During the Austrian occupation, generalissimo Laudon ordered a vast effort to fortify the city, which included the defensive trench which encircled a wider Belgrade area. The trench became known as the Laudan's Trench (Laudanov šanac) and passed in front of the gate which was accessed over a small bridge over it. Though smaller than the previous Württemberg Gate, it was still the largest of all city gates at the time, but was also considered the most beautiful.

The Stambol Gate got its name as it was the starting point of the Tsarigrad Road, which linked Belgrade with Constantinople. Hence the name of both the road (Carigrad was Serbian name for Constantinople) and the gate (after shortened Serbian version of the Ottoman name for Constantinople, "Istanbul Gate"). The gate was made of dressed stone and bricks, on a rectangular base. It had rooms for housing the sentry units and three entry points: large, central one, for the carts and two smaller ones on the sides for the pedestrians. Above the main entrance there was tughra, a medallion with the signature of the Ottoman sultan. Doors were made of thick oak beams, nailed down with the strong iron plating. In time, the plating became full of obvious bullet holes.

The Stambol Gate became notorious as the place in front of which the Turks executed the rayah, their non-Muslim subjects, by impaling them on stakes. It was also the place where during the attack on Belgrade in 1806 in the First Serbian Uprising, one of the leading Serbian military commanders, Vasa Čarapić, was fatally wounded. In his memory, a street near the square (Vasina Street) and a monument in the vicinity were named after him. When the rebellion collapsed, the Ottomans regained Belgrade in October 1813. Their vanguards burned wooden hovels in Savamala and when the main army landed, a large number of people remained stranded on the bank in Savamala, trying to flee across the river into Austria. Men were massacred, while women and children were sold into slavery. All over the city heads on a spike appeared, while people were impaled on stakes along all city roads. Rows of impaled people were placed from the gate to Terazije in one direction, and along the Tsarigrad Road itself, from the Batal mosque to Tašmajdan, in another.

The gate continued to have certain strategic role in the 18th and the 19th century. After 1815, when Serbia was granted autonomy, Ottoman guards were placed at the gate to control the entering into the fortress. Already notorious, it became a symbol of the hated Ottoman rule after the Čukur Fountain incident in 1862. After the armed clash and rioting which followed, the gate lost its importance as the Ottoman garrison withdrew into the Belgrade Fortress itself, abandoning the gate.

The gate was demolished in 1866, on the orders of Prince Michael, as the plans for the National Theatre were already in the works. The prince ordered it to be completely demolished to the ground on 20 March 1866. On 1 April, the military parade of the regular units of Serbian army was organized, from the gate, over Terazije, to the Old Konak, in the Royal Compound. Demolition began on 26 April, and the work was finished on 31 May 1866. That way, the last physical obstacle which divided city parts on the opposite sides of the trench was demolished, thus making neighborhoods outside of the old city walls one urban unit with the older part of the city which prompted accelerated urbanization. The Ottomans fully evacuated from Belgrade in 1867. The stones from the gate were re-used for the construction of the surrounding houses and for the building of the theatre itself. The rubble was partially used for burying the marsh in Bara Venecija, where the Belgrade Main railway station was built. When the square was renovated in 1928–1929, the remains of the Stambol Gate's foundations were discovered beneath the pavement, but it was not recorded whether the remains were dug up again or were removed. Additional remains were found in 1949, during another rearrangement of the square.

=== Formation of the square ===
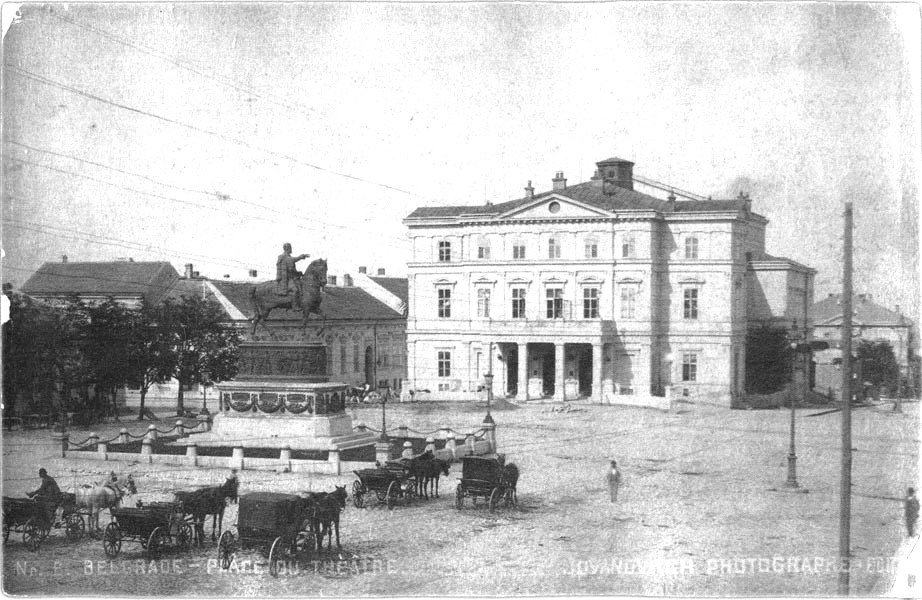
Theatre Square in 1895

Belgrade's first chief urbanist, Emilijan Josimović, devised a plan in 1867 for the system of "green groves" along the former route of the Laudon trench, which now divided old part of the city from the newer neighborhoods. The green belt was also to include avenues, promenades, etc. The plan was only partially conducted at the time, while the only two surviving parts of the plan are two small squares, at Topličin Venac, where the Park Proleće is today, and at the present Republic Square's section in front of the Central Military Club building.

After the demolition of the gate and establishment of Serbian rule in all of Belgrade in 1867, the site of the present square was not laid out for a long time. The remains of the Stambol Gate were still visible. They were surrounded by bogs and gullies and a row of black locusts, which was leading to the open farmer's market. The market was known for the lamb and pork meat, while the kiridžije, who transported various goods from Užice on their little horses, were bringing and selling bacon, sirene, kaymak, pršut and kegs of rakia.

The National Theatre, built in 1869, was the only large building for the more than 30 years as the square didn't develop as an urban area until the monument to Prince Mihailo was erected on 19 December 1882 when the square gradually started to acquire more buildings. The square was named Pozorišni Trg ("Theatre square"), keeping the name until the Communist rule after 1945. The square was formed between the theatre building, Cooperation of the printing workers, the Dardaneli kafana, the lots of Dimitrije and Lazar Andrejević, the Kolarac House with pharmacy and the First Belgrade Brewery.

The second ice rink in Belgrade, after one in Savamala, was built in 1909 near the modern Army House. The place where now the National Museum is, was the location of long single-storied building which housed, among other edifices, the famous "Dardaneli" restaurant, founded in 1855. It was the most popular kafana in Belgrade at that time, especially after the 1896 reconstruction, when it became the meeting-place of actors and writers, and the central point of city's urban spirit and bohemianism. The building was pulled down to make way in 1903 for the Treasury (now the building of the National Museum). In a small park next to the National Theatre, there were the well-known "Kolarac" kafana and cinema (owned by Ilija Milosavljević-Kolarac, a merchant and benefactor). The "Kolarac" was a regular meeting place of young officers and here, headed by Dragutin Dimitrijević Apis, they plotted the 1903 May Coup, which ended with the deaths of king Alexander Obrenović and queen Draga and termination of the Obrenović dynasty. As the building was also location of the Association of Writers of Serbia, the first book fair in the city was held here.

The square was damaged during World War I, in the bombardment by the Austro-Hungarian and German armies. Especially damaged was the building of the National Theatre. It was fully reconstructed by 1922.

The "Riunione" Palace, in which "Jadran" cinema used to be located, was built from 1929 to 1931, on one section of the Andrejević family parcel. It was built by the Adriatic Insurance Company "Riunione" from Trieste, Italy. The palace had apartments, offices, cinema "Uranija" and "Milanović" bistro. It was adapted into the pastry shop later (Kod kneževog spomenika) and is café-pastry shop even today. Part of the building was rented to German Transportation Bureau (Deutsches Verkehrs Buro). It was a public secret that it is actually a hotspot for German spies, but the state didn't react. Few days before the 27 March 1941 anti-German protests, including the coup d'état, Germans hastily left the building, so the protesters smashed it. Boško Buha Theatre is today located in that section of the building.

"Uranija" was later renamed "Jadran", and the cinema was popular for its repertoire, mostly made of dramas and romantic movies. When it was sold to the privately owned company in 2007, they resold it the a company from Cyprus which closed the cinema and opened a café and a pastry shop instead.

=== World War II and later ===
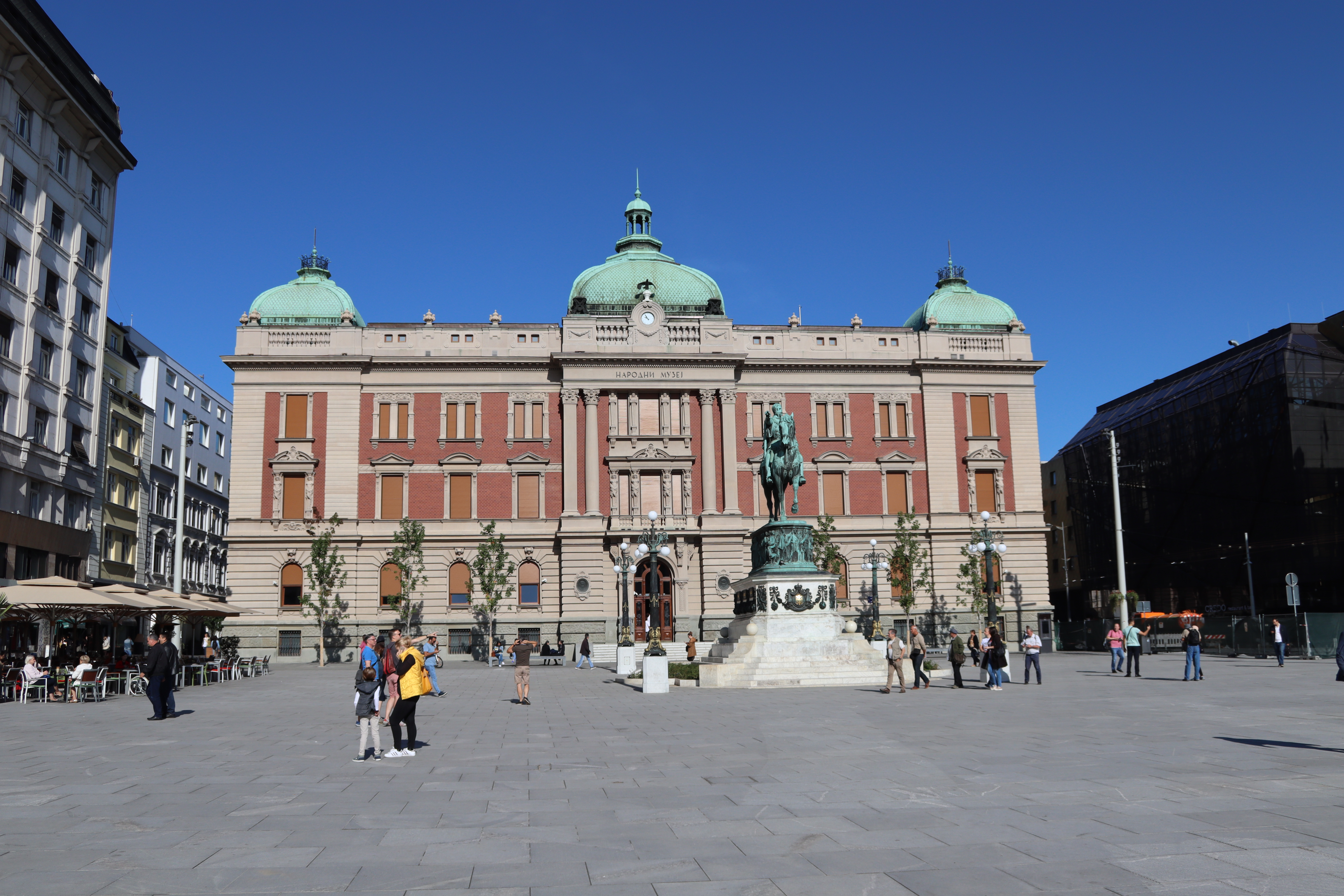
Republic Square after renovation

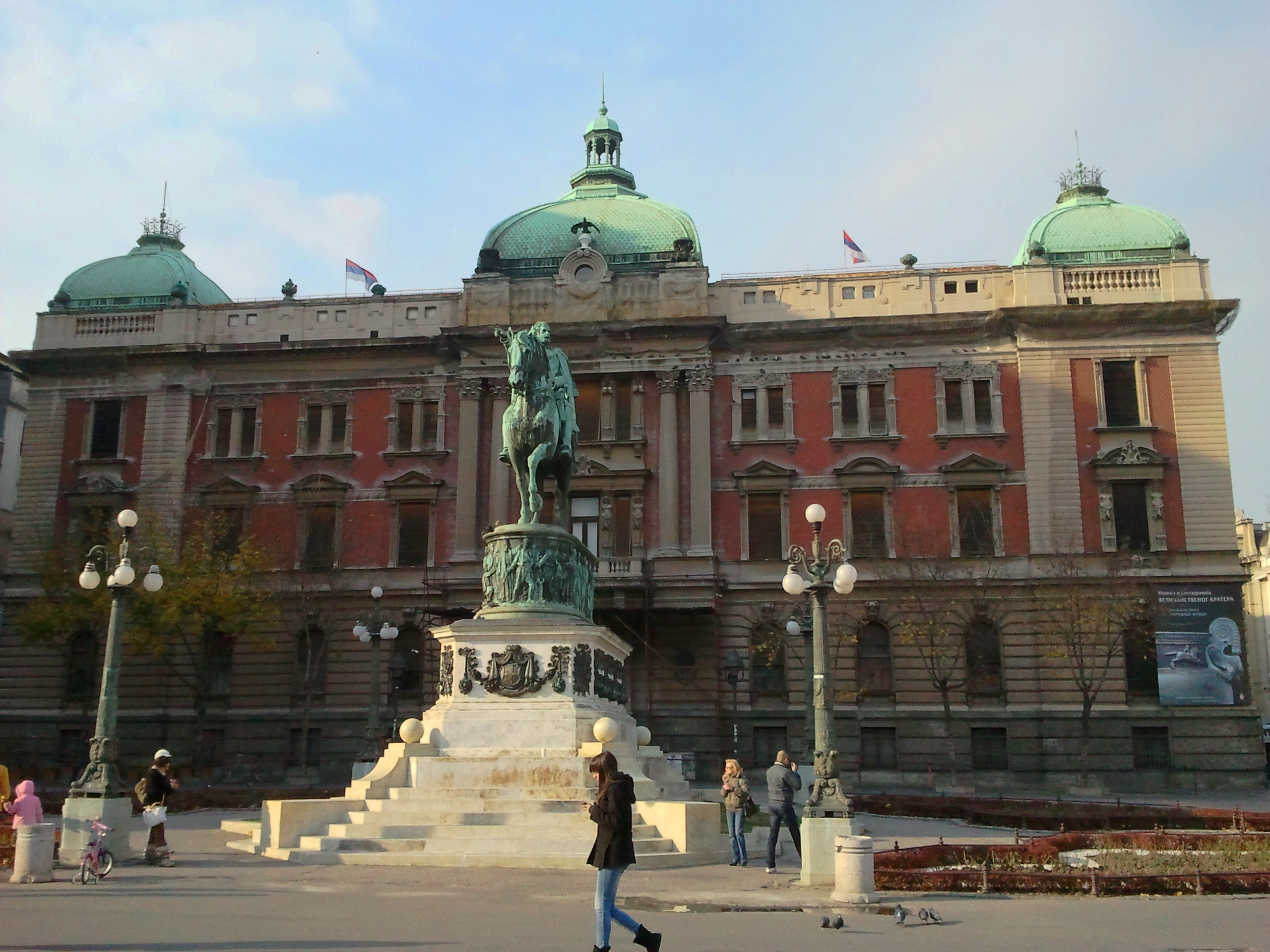
National Museum in Belgrade

Most of the buildings were destroyed during the German bombing on 6 April 1941. In the summer of 1942 a failed assassination on Dušan Letica by a group of six Yugoslav Partisans happened here. German occupational forces reconstructed the building of the theatre in 1942. After World War II, the tram tracks were removed as, until then, a tram terminus was located in the square.

During the Belgrade Offensive in 1944, in which the Partisans and the Red Army expelled occupying Germans from Belgrade, 24 Red Army tank crewmen were killed. On 23 October 1944, three days after the liberation, a funeral procession consisting of 24 tanks moved from the Slavija Square to the Republic Square, where the crewmen were buried. Among the buried soldiers was Lt. Nikolay Kravtsov (1921–44), who was the only soldier participant in the Belgrade Offensive awarded the Hero of the Soviet Union medal. General Vladimir Zhdanov held eulogy at the mass burial, but addressed Kravtsov specifically. In 1954, the crypt and the monument were moved to the newly formed Cemetery of the Liberators of Belgrade at Belgrade New Cemetery. The crypt was known as the "Monument with cross and five-pointed star".

Later, the biggest building on this square, the "Press House" was constructed in 1961 on the remaining part of the former Andrejević family lot, so as the "City Restaurant" and the International Press Center. For the construction of the Press House, a series of old, ground-floor houses was demolished.

In the early 1990s, club "Buha" was opened in the building of the Boško Buha Theatre. It was very popular in the 1990–1992 period as one of the first venues in Belgrade to play electronic music, and was also a pioneer of rave music in Serbia.

=== Opera controversy ===
The area of the present 'Plateau of Dr Zoran Đinđić', right across the National Theatre was seen as the site of the future Belgrade Opera from the 1960s. However, this became highly controversial issue, both academic and public, in the 2003, when city government decided to tear down the Staklenac mall (saying it has done its purpose, even though it was built in 1989) and to construct City Gallery, while the Opera is supposed to be built in the swampy and uninhabited area of Ušće in Novi Beograd. Despite opposition from the citizens, ensemble of the opera and prominent architects and artists, the city government, most prominently the official city architect Đorđe Bobić, insisted that regardless of everything, they already made a decision that the Opera will not be built on the Square. Architect Milan Pališaški proposed in 2003 a project "Opera on the Square". It included construction of the national opera and ballet house (up to 1,200 seats) and a large underground garage (1,400 parking spots). The project would rule out the need for smaller underground garages in the vicinity (like to one planned on Studentski Trg or, as it is the case with La Scala and Covent Garden, a separate building for the Belgrade Philharmonic Orchestra which could also use it. The project, which also included the underground passage which would connect the new building with the building of the National Theatre across the Francuska Street, was supported by the "Opera at the Square" movement, headed by the opera singer Živan Saramandić. As of 2018 nothing has been either demolished or built.

In 2015 city announced that the Staklenac mall (Serbian for glassy) will be demolished. The mall, with 4,000 m^{2} (43,000 sq ft) of floor area, was built in 1989 on a temporary permit from 1988, which expired after ten years. Hence, the object can't be officially legalized. It was built concurrently with the reconstruction of the National Theatre, in the scopes of the city beautification for the IX Non-Aligned Movement summit which was held in Belgrade. New project is a cultural venue, covering 15,000 m^{2} (160,000 sq ft) and comprising galleries, bookstores, conference halls and an underground garage for 500 vehicles. In August 2017, city architect Milutin Folić said that the plan will include opera, ballet and a gallery, or a combination of those, though that was not in the project accepted in 2015 and even announced a possibility of yet another architectural design competition.

In January 2018 it was again announced by the city that the mall will be demolished to make room for an opera and ballet house. It was disclosed that the demolition will start in the summer of 2018, but there is a possibility of postponing it, as the city will only then organize an architectural design competition so there is no economic point in demolishing the well established mall so early. In August 2018 it was announced by the city officials that the Staklenac will be demolished and the building of the Opera and ballet house will be built, "in the next several years". Some architects consider opera house on the square as a bad solution. City then announced in March 2022 that the "House of Dance" will be built instead on the location.

=== 21st century ===
After 2013, new city government announced the closing of the entire downtown for traffic, including the square, and turning the central city area in the pedestrian zone. The square and the entire section till the Kalemegdan will be paved in granite or concrete slabs, almost without any trees. The idea met with the universal opposition from the professionals (architects, urbanists, traffic experts) but also from the public. Total open pedestrian square area, west of the thoroughfare, is 0.375 hectares (0.93 acres) – of which 0.225 hectares (0.56 acres) is the plateau with the prince's monument, and 0.15 hectares (0.37 acres) is the section with fountains which connects the square with the Knez Mihailova Street.

In 2017 city announced plans for the details of the major reconstruction of the square. The flower beds will be removed, the square will be paved with granite slabs and the traffic calming zone will be formed. The works started in August 2018 and the deadline is 14 months. The works will be organized in two phases. Phase I is dealing with the square plateau itself and should be finished on 1 March 2019. In the phase II, the streets will be closed for adaptation and renovation, rerouting the traffic in the sole center of the city. It is planned that the granite slabs in different color will mark the locations of some former landmarks, like the Stambol Gate and the temporary graveyard from 1944. During the process, the Prince Michael Monument will be renovated, too. In the end, even this idea was abandoned.

In September 2018, during the excavations, original wooden cobble laid in the second half of the 19th century was discovered. Once, the entire square, up to the Terazije, was covered with it. The cobbles were removed for cleaning. One part will be returned and form the protected patch so that pedestrians can see what the cobble looked like. Another part will be kept in the National Museum while the third will be used for other pedestrian areas in the city. Also, it was originally thought that remains of the former Stambol Gate were discovered, though it was believed that nothing survived. The remains were to be preserved and shielded by glass so that they will remain visible to passersby. The works were then stopped again for a while after the remains of the Roman tombs were discovered. It was later announced that the remains are actually of the Württemberg Gate, not the Stambol Gate. It was decided to scrap the idea of a glass cover which would leave the remains visible, and to continue with the original plan which included reburying of the remains and differently colored slabs which will mark its former position.

The deputy mayor Goran Vesić said that the works will be done "24 hours a day" and that cameras will be installed so that everyone can watch the progress. Asked why it takes 420 days for such a reconstruction, under such a rigorous working hours, Vesić replied that it was a question for the authors of the project. Soon, reporters and public figures noted that the working site is still without workers from time to time or that it took less to build the entire Empire State Building, back in 1930–1931. In April 2019, administration of the Stari Grad municipality began intermittent physical blockades of the construction site and removal of the construction fencing, hence "liberating the square". Employees, local residents and sympathizers of the opposition would either physically prevent machines from working and escort workers from the site or would organize sport activities or sitting sessions on the square thus stopping works.

Public complains continued, including the lack of greenery and replacement of the street pavement with the stone slabs. The cobblestone was placed as it was originally intended to turn the entire square into the pedestrian zone, but after much protests, the idea was scrapped, at least for now. Instead, city urbanist Marko Stojčić announced the revival of an old idea of building an underground garage on the square. During one of his inspections, president Vučić said that the massive building of the Press House should be demolished because it is "so ugly". Despite the legion of problems caused by the reconstruction, a patio of the local café, belonging to the controversial businessman with criminal past Predrag Ranković Peconi, was opened and operational all the time, even though it was right next to the reconstruction site.

In June 2022 city announced that the Boško Buha Theatre will get additional, evening scene in the building of the Post Office No. 6 which was to be renovated within the project Belgrade Waterfront. However, in March 2023 the theatre ensemble went to protest as they were informed the entire theatre will be relocated from the Riunione Palace, where it has been since the foundation in 1950 and has indefinite lease right, to Belgrade Waterfront. Problem turned out to be the ownership in the cadaster, which was explained to the ensemble being a mistake which will be corrected.

Problem turned out to net that the premises of the theatre were purchased by the company owned by Aleksandar Kajmaković in 2017. Nicknamed Aca Bosanac, he already owns numerous hospitality venues throughout Belgrade, including the recently purchased Western City Gate which also caused protests. Kajmaković's connections to major criminal clans in Serbia include being a right-hand man of Peconi. He was also apprehended by the police during investigation of top Serbian gang kingpin Veljko Belivuk for suspicion of Kajmaković acting as the legal owner of Belivuk's properties safeguarded by the Belivuk's gang members, and for money laundering. A bomb was placed under Kajmaković's car in 2002 in Budva, Montenegro.

A state cadaster service reacted claiming everything is clear and legal, and that there is no mistake. A major public backlash, and support for the theatre from citizens and colleagues, ensued. Prime minister Ana Brnabić personally intervened, claiming the theatre stays at the square, and accusing previous administration for "vague documentation" which allowed for the "mistaken" registration of Kajmaković's company despite all the cadastre registrations in question happened during the present administration. She then contradicted herself and the cadaster, claiming that actually nothing is true, including Kajmaković's ownership, but that his company, as a co-owner of the building, gave permission to the city to reconstruct the theatre.

=== Post-reconstruction ===
The square was reopened on 1 September 2019. Public reaction was overwhelmingly negative: carriageway cobblestones were 41,000 cubes of rugged stone which made driving unpleasant and motorcycle, bicycle, pedestrian traffic almost impossible. City claimed such cubes were placed deliberately, to slow down the vehicles. At the widest section, the carriageways were narrowed. In protest, residents placed a fake monument to Goran Vesić on the square. City and state official praised the works. President of the Republic, Aleksandar Vučić, said the square looks "wonderful and that the cobblestone is from high quality material which is "for ever". Vesić said they originally wanted plain concrete cubes, but president Vučić said "no, you are doing the central city square, place everything best for Belgrade...and he was right, so we placed the best granite".

Less than two weeks later, heavy rains damaged the surface layer of the carriageways, prompting question whether it was granite at all. Amidst continued negative reactions, Stojčić said granite cubes will be turned upside down, with lower, flat part of the cubes on top. Vesić, claiming he was in a "surprise control visit", had an outburst, scolding the contractor "Strabag" (which billed additional €287,000 for "unexpected works"), calling them to repair it with their own money and without closing the traffic. Asked how the cubes, by city's orders with rugged side up, were praised for 12 days, Vesić replied that "Strabag had to point out this is not a functional solution", calling the situation "unacceptable". 15 days after the re-opening, "reconstruction of the reconstruction" began. Despite promises, the traffic was stopped again.

Repairs showed cubes are not made of granite as stipulated by the invitation to tender and paid as such by the city, but concrete cubes with a thin silicone-glued rugged layer on top. Architects criticized the process – simple flipping of the cubes, especially glued ones like this – as a threat for traffic safety, especially during rain or winter, with pedestrians already complaining the cubes are slippery. The responsible engineer refused to sign the reconstruction project as the original project was changed by the city during the reconstruction, unknowingly to the public. Additional rains showed the draining system on the square wasn't functional.

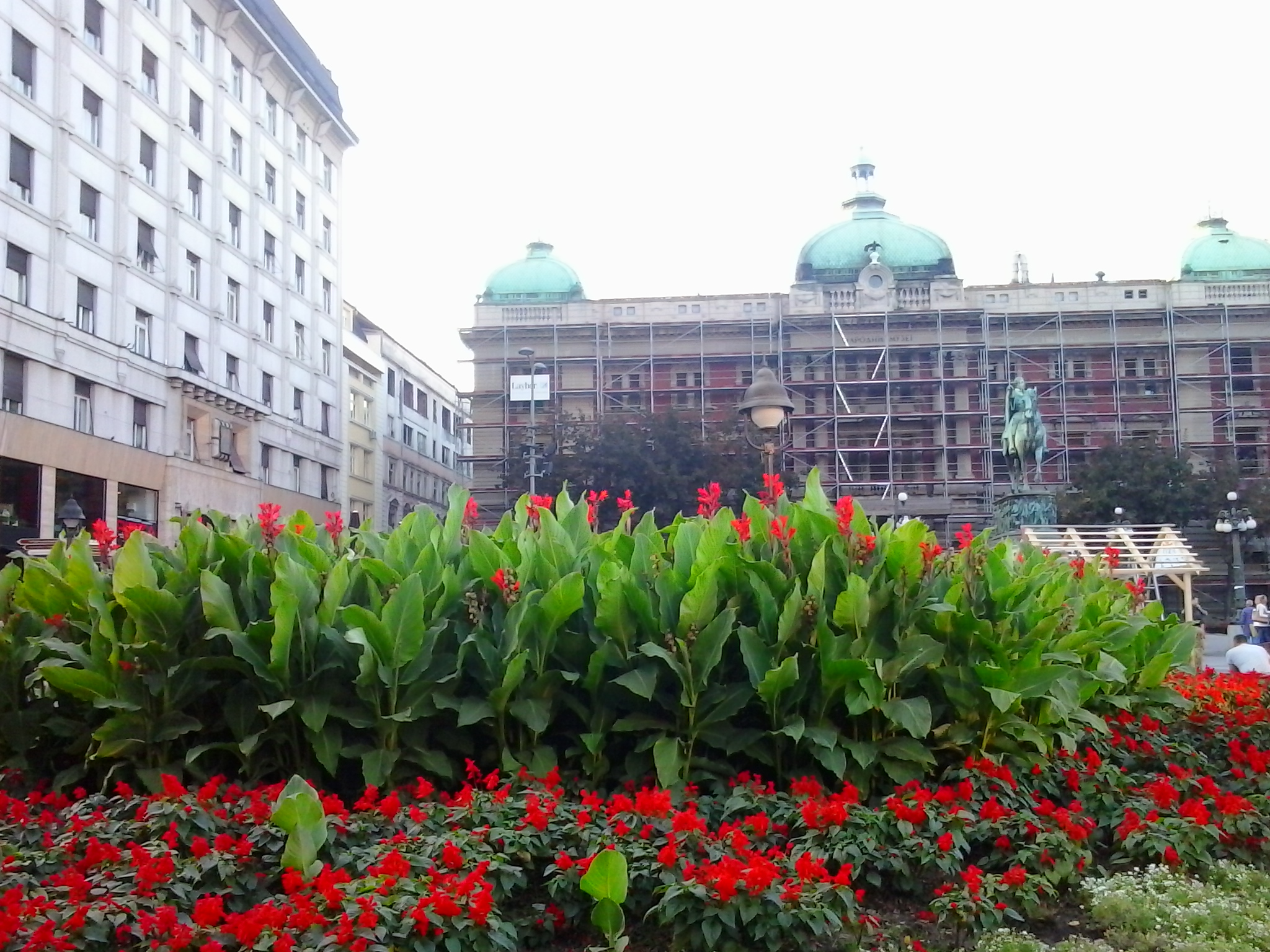
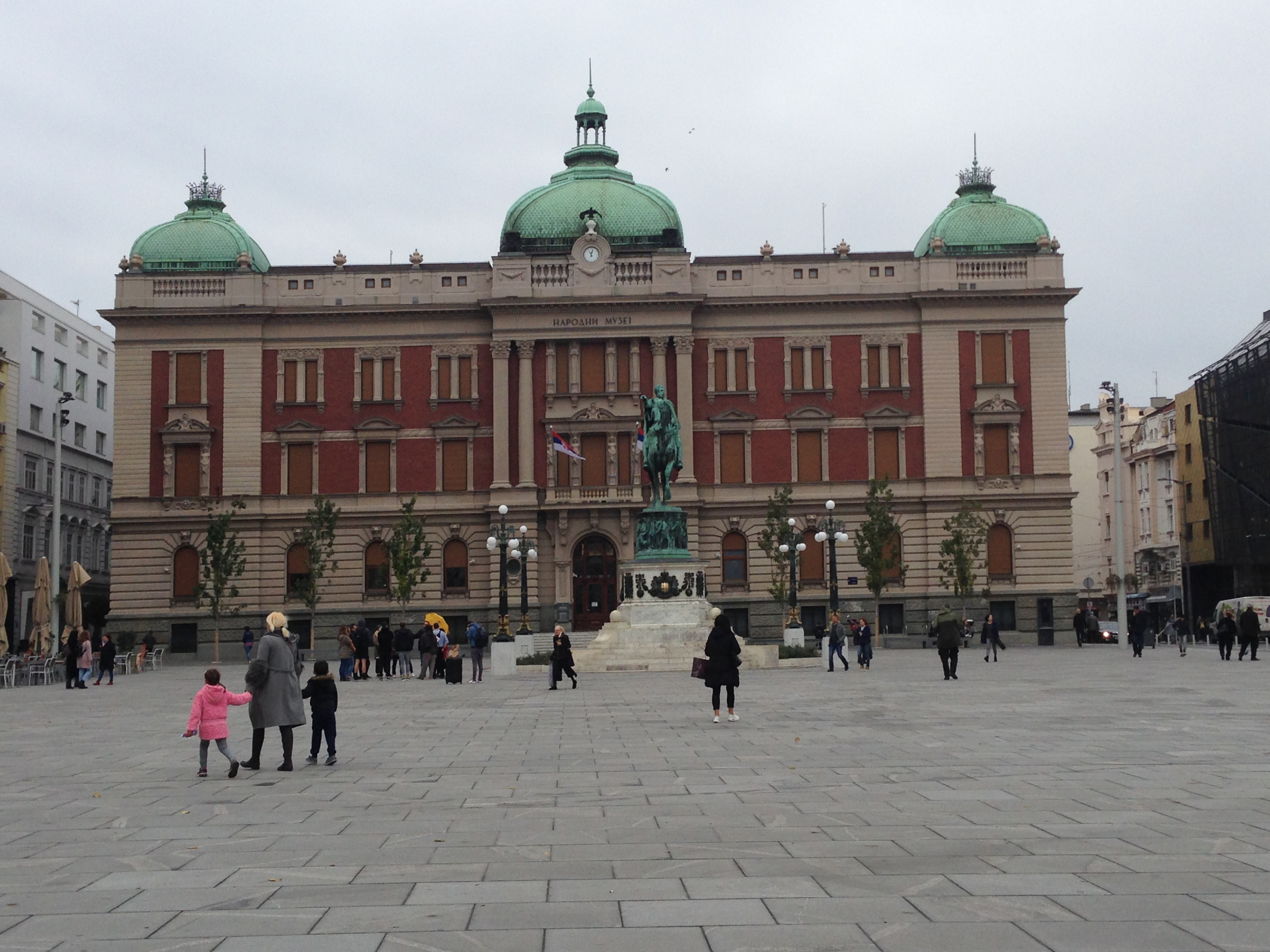
The square before the 2018-2019 reconstruction (left) and after (right)

President Vučić supported city government again, saying "Vesić has done everything right" and that he doesn't understand the "hysteria surrounding continued works", adding he is proud how things are done in Belgrade. City claims the total price of the reconstruction is €8 million, which is deemed way to high and criticized even by the state Radio Television Serbia. Architect Dragoljub Bakić estimated real cost to no more than €4.4 million, though he deemed the reconstruction as unnecessary anyway. In protest, students painted cubes in "gold", to show how things function in Belgrade: façades are painted, but everything decays inside. They were invoking government's claim that Serbia currently lives its "golden age". City filed charges against students claiming they are hooligans who destroy "granite" cubes. It was soon obvious that new cubes, instead of the old, turned upside down ones, are being placed. Mayor Zoran Radojičić, when asked who is paying for this, said: "Well, you know what, I can't really know about every single cube, you have to admit that".

The square was re-re-opened for traffic on 1 November 2019, however, despite claims that all lines of public transportation will be restored, two trolleybus lines remained shortened to Slavija Square, while two were completely abolished. This right away resulted in crowds in the surviving lines and massive public discontent. Authorities said that everything is covered with changing buses on other lines, but it turned out that for some, previously direct routes, it takes an extra hour for the commuters. But it was also reported that the reduction is part of the plan to transform the main traffic route into the pedestrian zone and because of the weight restrictions due to the botched reconstruction of the square. City responded that they acted after "serious analyses and talks" and upon wishes of the citizens. Asked to make public those analyses and explain when and how the citizens were interviewed about such "tectonic" changes, administration refused to disclose any documents. Simultaneously, city extended the deadline to 23 January 2020, which would make the reconstruction 519 days long, though without specifications what will be done in this period, except that there will be "no field work". In the end, locations of the Stambol Gate and the Red Army soldiers burial site were marked with different slabs. City announced that the total expenditures per contract (for 420 days) is 768.3 million dinars, or €6.5 million, but that exact number will be known by the end of the year. The warranty period is three years. In the end, city claimed that the total price was 744 million dinars, or €6.4 million.

In August 2020, city announced continuation of their idea of closing the central city streets for traffic and the reintroduction of the tram line across the square. The bidding for the project was announced and, though the works were not planned in at least a year due to the preparatory works, they should include another removal of the new cubes so that tracks can be placed. Due to the negative reactions, and even though deputy mayor Vesić said in 2018 that the tracks will, at least partially, be laid already in 2019, city's Directorate for Land Development now claimed that works can't start before 2025 or 2027, while president Vučić, who personally pushed the project, now called it unnecessary. Just few days after the announcement, the directorate called the bidding off.

University of Manchester professor and meteorologist Vladimir Janković, was guest in the September issue of the TV serial Completely Natural, hosted by Jovan Memedović. Janković estimated that, in September, in sunset, temperature of the square's granite slabs is up to 45 °C (113 °F). This heat is then being radiated over the entire night, until the next morning. He concluded this wouldn't happen if majority of the square remained covered by the flower beds, trees and a fountain.

By the February 2024, section of the reconstructed square in the direction of the Vasina Street deteriorated and sank so much, that the cobblestone had to be removed, and the asphalt concrete was restored. Even the pro-government media reported that the cobblestones were not the good choice, and that reconstruction was scandalous.

== Architecture ==
In terms of architecture, the square is not favorably perceived by the architects and artists nor is considered a proper square, which are generally lacking in Belgrade. Isidora Sekulić wrote in the 1930s that "in Belgrade, you have no beautiful squares. The square is a bordered and appeasing plane, which can't express the real character of Belgrade which is arbitrary, complex and opposed to the planimetrics". During the Interbellum, the square was smaller and less "spilled" than it is today. One the sides where the Press House, space in front of it and park area in front of the Staklenac are today, the square was cornered by two blocks of tall and unrepresentative buildings. In such arrangement, the Riunione Palace (modern Boško Buha Theatre) was de facto the frontal edifice of the square's composition, despite the building of the National Theatre was clearly the most public object.

The objects surrounding the square were all of different heights, creating "height schism" and not allowing for the buildings to be considered as an "ensemble". As a result of this, after the Riunione Palace was built in 1931, it created insulating fluctuation, both daily and seasonal. After the noon, one half of the square is in deep shade while the other is fully lit up. In summer, this becomes extreme due to the heat, which was only aggravated with the 2018-2019 reconstruction. Building of the Mortgage Bank (now a National Museum) wasn't a proper public building until it was adapted into the museum. Just as the height is diversified, the arrangement on the ground is off the markers, too. The strictly symmetrical front façade of the museum faces the monument to Prince Michael, which, however, is not in the symmetrical axis regarding the museum's façade. Older, monument was placed right in the central axis between the Vasina and Čika Ljubina streets and misses the museum's axis because the streets are not equally wide.

After the reconstruction, the square retained its amorphous borderline. The curved section to the Kolarčeva Street was bounded by two rows of trees, some of which withered before the reconstruction was finished. However, several trees were placed in front of the museum's front façade, closing it, especially as the trees grow bigger in the future. Though it was tried to transform the square into the "casserole" (tepsija), the perceptive plane of the square was indeed lowered to the level zero but it only made obvious the tilting of the square. While some, even more tilted squares are considered architectural gems, like the Piazza Grande in Arezzo, the Republic Square misses all the important elements: spatial articulation, borderline edifices and impeccable junction details of all objects with the paved ground. In the "shaved" square, the tilted empty space reinforced its "collage" character.

In December 2021, the existing 21 trees on the square were replaced, with the idea of uniforming the species of trees. Newly planted but already mostly withered sycamore maples were replaced with plane trees. Maple trees which remained in good shape were replanted across the city. However, the older linden trees, across the street and in front of the Staklenac, were not replaced with planes, but with ash trees.

== Characteristics ==
The square is one of the busiest places in Belgrade, as one of the central business areas in the city, with over 20 bus and trolleybus lines of the city public transportation passing through the square.

On one side, the square extends to the Knez Mihailova street, the pedestrian zone and one of the main commercial sections of Belgrade. On the opposite side, the square is occupied by the Staklenac, the Belgrade's first modern glass and steel constructed shopping mall. The small flat area in front of Staklenac has been officially named 'Plateau of Dr Zoran Đinđić', after the Serbian prime minister was assassinated in 2003. There are two park areas in this section of the square. One, in front of the Army House ("Guards Park", which covers 0.1 hectares (0.25 acres)), and another in front of the Staklenac (0.225 hectares (0.56 acres)).

=== Prince Michael monument ===
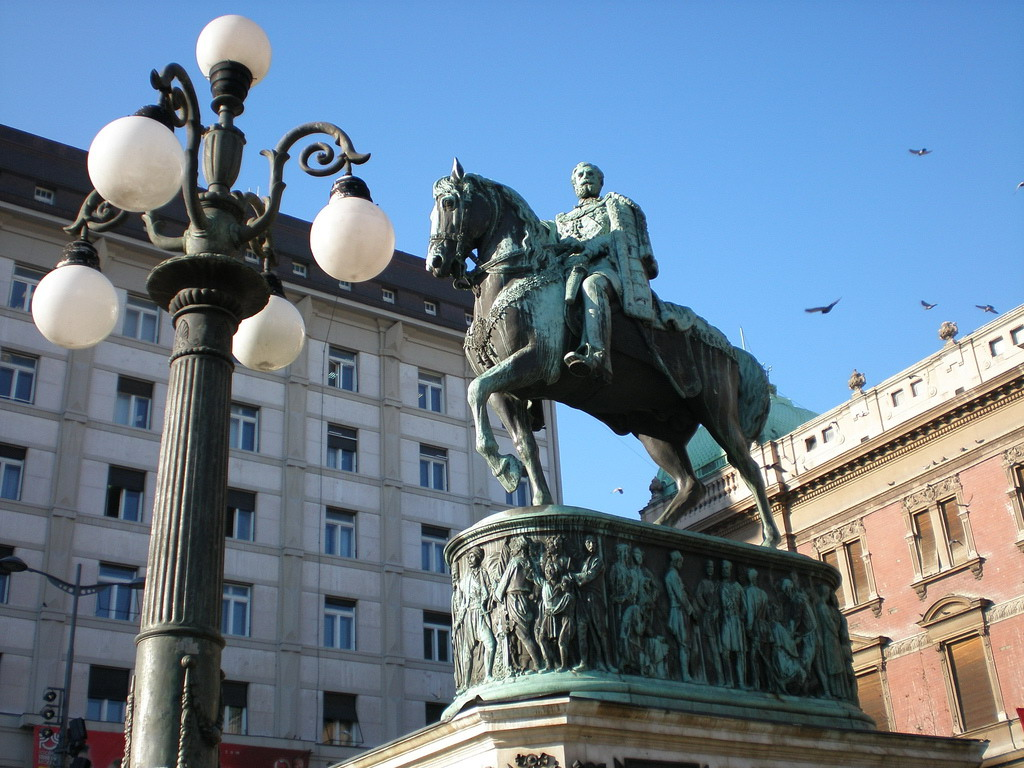
Statue of Prince Mihailo

The bronze statue of Prince Michael on a horse, by the Italian sculptor Enrico Pazzi was erected in 1882. It was erected in honor of the Prince's most important political achievement, complete expulsion of the Turks from Serbia and liberation of the remaining 7 cities within (then) Serbian territory, still under the Turkish rule (1867). The names of the cities are carved on a plates on the monument itself, on the statue's pedestal and prince is sculptured with his hand allegedly pointing to Constantinople, showing the Turks to leave. During recent years, the role and honor of prince somewhat fell into the oblivion and the statue became simply known as kod konja (Serbian for 'at the horse'). Even the nearby restaurant is named that way, Kod konja.

=== Millennium clock ===
In 2000, a modern public clock, named the Millennium clock and funded by Delta Holding, was installed in the square. The clock is placed on a tall stand, and it also displays current weather conditions. Two main, digital clocks face the less busy sides of the square (near Čika Ljubina and Kolarčeva streets), while two small, analog clocks face the two busier sides (near Knez Mihailova street and the National Theatre). The clock and its stand are made of chromed steel and glass and the stands are 4 and 6 m (13 and 20 ft) tall.

The clock was described as the "nice and modern architectural detail" of Belgrade and that it has been designed and built in the accordance with the surrounding objects. Due to its appearance and construction, it looks almost transparent. With the addition of the clock, as the square is one of the most popular meeting points in the city, for a while Belgraders also used 'let's meet at the clock' as a meeting catchphrase, but by 2018 the clock was out of order for a long time. Public opinion on the clock remained divided as it was perceived by many as a foreign body in the square environment.

One of the complaints by the citizens during the massive 2018-2019 reconstruction was why the clock wasn't removed from the square. In August 2019 it was announced that the clock will be moved to the plateau next to the Belgrade Arena, across the Sava river, in the New Belgrade. On 8 August 2019 the clock and the entire installation were dismantled and sent to the repair shop as it was out of service for years. After the repairs, it will be installed next to the Arena.

=== Jugoexport building ===
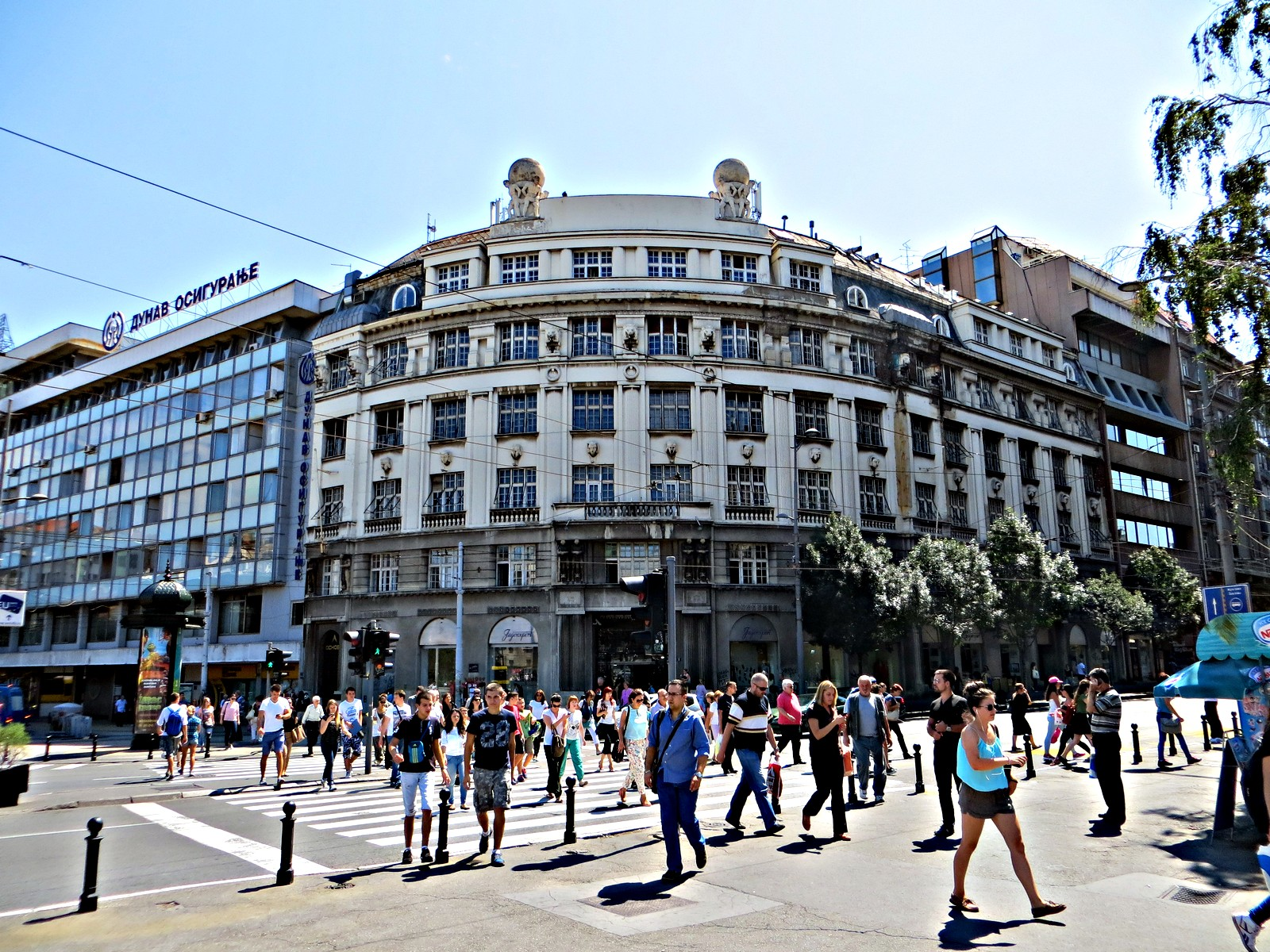
Jugoexport building

Lushly decorated building at the entry section into the square from the Terazije direction was built in 1923. Located in the Kolarčeva Street, the building has a total floor area of 5,505 m^{2} (59,260 sq ft) and is protected within the Spatial Cultural-Historical Complex of Old Belgrade. The building is projected by the architect Matija Bleh, but it is better known for its façade ornamentation, which can be divided into the façade plastics and sculptures. Ornamental plastic was done by the Czech sculptor Karel Pavlík while Serbian sculptor of Italian origin Giuseppe Pino Grassi carved the sculptures in artificial stone. Decorative elements include figures of Atlases with Earth on their shoulders, male heads with šajkača caps, female heades with bandanas, half-figures of lions, etc.

After World War II, the building was occupied by the state-owned trade company Jugoexport. Jugoexport went bankrupt in 2001 and state tried to sell the building since 2006, but it was unsuccessful in the next 10 years. Main flaws of the building included non-functionality, high maintenance costs and lack of parking places. Serbian industrialist Petar Matijević, nicknamed the "meat king" purchased the object in 2016 for €7,3 million, with an intention to turn it into hotel. It was announced that actually his sons purchased the building to him for his birthday, in the memory of Matijević's father, who worked in the building as a bellboy.

Adaptation into the hotel began in November 2017. As the building is protected, the exterior must be preserved. The investment is €6 million and it is expected to return in the next 12 years. Matijević also purchased a lot of 500 m^{2} (5,400 sq ft) in Simina Street, below the square, for the future parking lot. The four star hotel with 68 tooms, which should be named "Centar", is expected to open in summer of 2018, but as of July 2019 the hotel still wasn't finished.
