= Jugoexport =

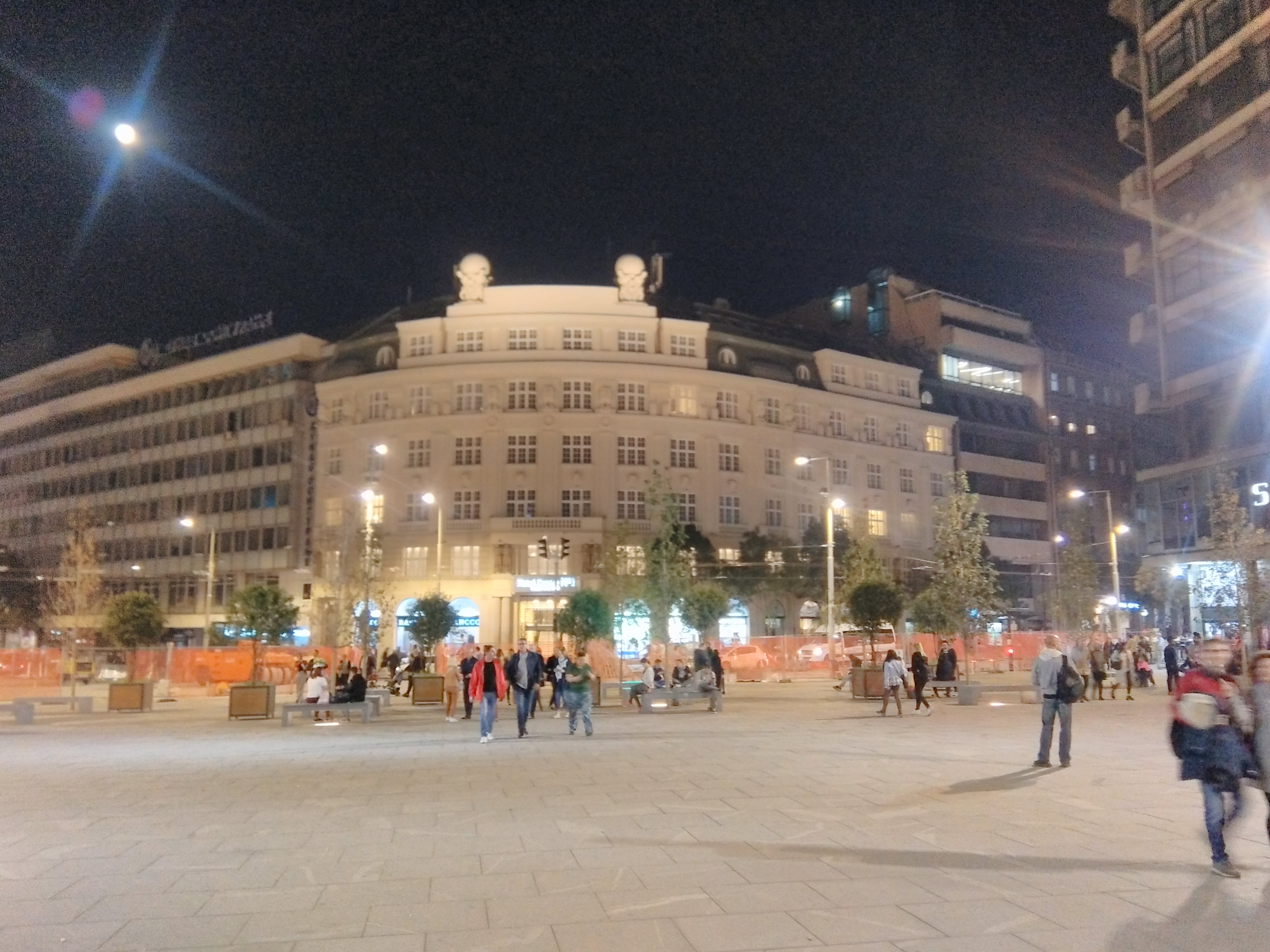
- Former building of Jugoexport at the Republic Square in Belgrade
- Type: State-owned
- Industry: Exporting
- Headquarters: Belgrade, Serbia

Jugoexport was a Serbian Import - export company established in 1953 in Belgrade, then capital of Yugoslavia. The firm established a retail business selling imported items and with time became a leading firm of such type in Yugoslavia. Its designers chose items by worldwide creators to be imported into the country, until they were joined by the fashion designer Mirjana Marić in 1970, who began the firm's own line of locally manufactured clothing for export. These collections were then realized in the largest and best clothing houses of the SFRY.

In 1990, Jugoexport began the My way project, headed by Gorica Popesko Pešić. In 1992, the company was hit with economic sanctions as a result of the Yugoslav Wars and the ongoing breakup of Yugoslavia. Business conditions became more difficult, which had a negative impact on the work of Jugoexport, and thus their influence on the Serbian fashion scene disappeared.

The company went bankrupt in 2001 and the Belgrade-based building was left to the state, which was unable to sell it until 2016 due to poor technical condition, obsolescence and high operating costs.

It used to be present in all large cities of former Yugoslavia, but the only remnant of the company in modern times is the former subsidiary of Jugoexport Stil based in Skopje, North Macedonia.
