= History of the Aromanians =

The Aromanians are an Eastern-Romance speaking ethnic group native to the southern Balkans. Their origins are debated but they are generally considered to be the descendants of the Romanized native populations who developed a distinct language sometime no later than the 10th century. They have historically been referred with the term "Vlachs", with their name in the languages of most of the countries they live in being a word related to this term.

During the medieval times, they had managed to set up their own autonomous region, Great Vlachia, though it never developed into an independent state. They have been traditionally associated with a transhumance lifestyle travelling in the mountainous regions of the Balkans. During the Ottoman period, they started to engage in trading and craftsmanship and started concentrating in urban centers, with the most notable one being Moscopole, which was a major center of Aromanian culture until its destruction in the 18th century.

Many Aromanians have been assimilated into more prominent ethnic groups and they have played significant roles in the history of their respective countries, most notably in Greece, which has the largest Aromanian population of any country. Two attempts for Aromanian independence were made there in the 20th century, the Samarina Republic during WWI and the Principality of Pindus during WWII, though both of them got little support by the local population.

== Origins ==
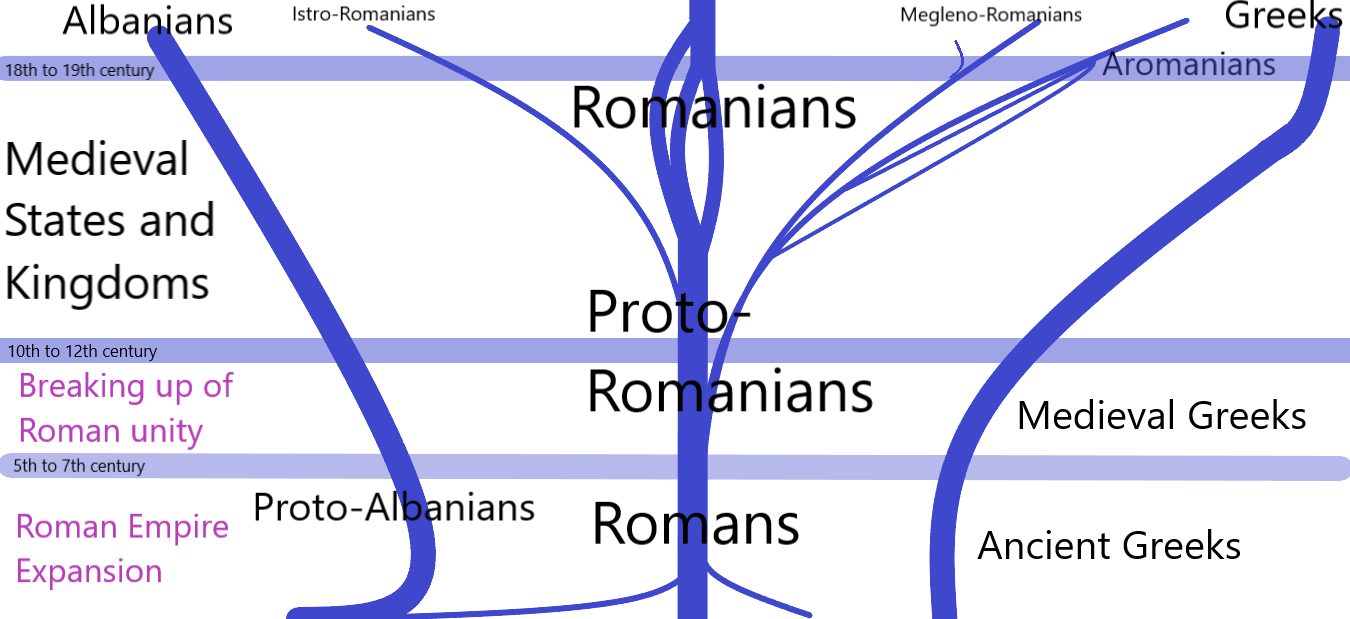
Development of Daco-Romance languages

Aromanians were identified as Vlachs in medieval times. Vlachs, also Wallachian (and many other variants), is a historical term and exonym used from the Middle Ages until the Modern Era to designate speakers of Eastern Romance languages living in the Balkans and north of the Danube. The Vlach peoples from the south Balkans have generally been identified as the indigenous populations with Thracian & Illyrian (Thraco-Illyrian) and Greco-Roman (Hellenic) and true Roman empire origins. Many Vlachs settled into the less-accessible mountainous areas of Greece and other areas in the Balkans because of the barbarian (Germanic, Avar and Bulgar) invasions and immigrations of the 5th-7th centuries. They can be found all over the Balkan Peninsula. Aromanians can be found in Greece, Bulgaria, Albania and the Republic of North Macedonia, while Romanians in Romania, Moldova, Ukraine, Serbia and Hungary. Their occupations were mostly trading, live-stock breeding, shepherding and craftsmanship. According to language studies Aromanian was spoken (and still is) in the southern region of Balkan peninsula (Dardania, Epirus, Macedonia, Thrace), and no later than the 10th century separated from the larger area where Common Romanian presumably was spoken.

== History ==
=== Byzantine period ===
In 980 emperor Basil II conferred the dominion over the Vlachs of Thessaly on one Nikulitsa.

As Kekaumenos records, a first revolt against imperial rule occurred in 1066 under the lead of Nikoulitzas Delphinas, nephew of the 10th century Vlach leader, but it was not until after the collapse of the Empire in the Fourth Crusade that the Vlachs would set up their own, autonomous, principality – "Great Vlachia".

Benjamin of Tudela, a Spanish Jew who visited Thessaly in 1173, describes the Vlachs as living in the mountains and coming down from them to attack the Greeks. In relation with the Byzantine Empire, he adds: "no Emperor can conquer them".

Ivanko was a Vlach leader of a small autonomous land and he is the one who killed Ivan Asen I, the ruler of Vlach-Bulgarian state. Ivanko established an autonomous land between the Maritza and Struma rivers, and towards the shores of the Aegean Sea, favouring the settlement of the Vlachs in these areas.

Niketas Choniates wrote about a Vlach called Dobromir Chrysus who established an autonomous polity in the upper region of Vardar river and Moglena.

The chronicles of Nicetas Choniates, Benjamin of Tudela, Geoffroy de Villehardouin, Henry of Valenciennes, Robert de Clari, and other sources account for the existence of this state, comprising Thessaly, as opposed to other two "Wallachias", "Little Wallachia" in Acarnania and Aetolia, and an "Upper Wallachia" in Epirus. This coincides with the period of the first Vlach state entities across the Balkan Peninsula: Great Wallachia, Wallachia and Moldavia. After the conquest of Thessaly by the medieval state of Epirus in the 1210s, the Vlachs/Aromanians became the elite troops of the Epirote army against the Latin Crusaders as well as against the armies of Nicaea, a rival state to Byzantium.

=== Ottoman period ===
During the Ottoman period, Aromanian culture and economic power became more evident, as Vlachs concentrated in major urban centers. For example, the city of Moscopole at that time was one of the largest cities of the Balkans, having a population of 60,000 (for comparison, at that time Athens was a village inhabited by 8,000 people). Moscopole had its own printing house and academies, flowing water and sewerage network. They enjoyed some degree of religious and cultural autonomy within the Greek Orthodox Millet (a Turkish term for a legally protected ethnic and religious minority groups). They enjoyed a special status, being formally exempted from the law prohibiting non-Muslims from carrying weapons, only having to pay a modest tribute to the Ottomans. In 1778 however, Moscopole was nearly razed to the ground by the troops of Ali Pasha. This episode and the Orthodox religion of the Vlachs were the factors which caused a violent and energetic struggle against the Ottomans, assigning to the Vlachs a major role in the various wars and revolutions against Ottoman rule that culminated in the creation of the states which they now inhabit: Albania, North Macedonia, Bulgaria and Greece.

People of Aromanian origin were to be found among the protagonists of early Greek political life, as they found opportunities to establish themselves in this new state. This is explained by the fact that many Aromanians, who, as mentioned, belonged to the Greek Orthodox Millet, adopted the Greek language under the influence of the Greek schools and churches, the only ones entitled by the Ottomans to function and to by maintained by the Ecumenical Patriarchs of Constantinople. Thus, in Ottoman eyes, they were practically equated with Greeks. For instance, the future Patriarch Athenagoras, born in Ottoman Epirus, was considered a Greek by descent. But some Vlachs wanted to preserve their language, customs and culture, and as might be expected there was a strong reaction against this policy of Hellenization. Sir Charles Eliot clearly states his work "Turkey in Europe" that "...The Bulgarians, Serbs and Vlachs have millets of their own and do not cooperate in the Hellenic cause" and that "we hear of Vlach bands who are said to contend (fight against) Greeks in the region of Karaferia (Veria)". There was also pressure on Aromanians to become linguistically assimilated, which can be traced back to the 18th century, when assimilation efforts were encouraged by the Greek missionary Cosmas of Aetolia (1714–1779) who taught that Aromanians should speak Greek because as he said "it's the language of our Church" and established over 100 Greek schools in northern and western Greece. The offensive of the clergy against the use of Aromanian was by no means limited to religious issues but was a tool devised in order to convince the non-Greek speakers to abandon what they regarded as a "worthless" idiom and adopt the superior Greek speech: "There we are Metsovian brothers, together with those who are fooling themselves with this sordid and vile Aromanian language... forgive me for calling it a language", "repulsive speech with a disgusting diction".

=== Awakening of the Aromanian identity, and Romanian sponsorship ===
Their arrival there coincided with the spreading in Europe of the ideals of the French Revolution: nationhood, equality, mother tongue and human rights. In Habsburg-occupied Transylvania, they would connect with the latinophile Romanian intelligentsia, as part of what was known as the Transylvanian School. These intellectuals promoted the ideas which would spark the period known as the National awakening of Romania, which, after a century's time ceased to be under de jure Ottoman rule. It is in these times that Aromanian personalities became prominent, such as Gheorghe Constantin Roja, the author of "Untersuchungen uber die Romanier oder sogenannten Wlachen, welche jenseits der Donau wohnen" ("Researches upon the Romanians or the so-called Vlachs, who live beyond the Danube"; Pesth, 1808). The first attempt to create a literary language for those described as "Macedo-Romanians" was Roja's "Maiestria ghiovasirii romanesti cu litere latinesti, care sant literele Romanilor ceale vechi"(Buda, 1809). Another Aromanian emigrant was Mihail G. Boiagi. In 1813, he would publish in Vienna the book Γραμματική Ρωμαϊκή ήτοι Μακεδονοβλαχική/Romanische oder Macedonowlachische Sprachlehre ("Romance or Macedono-Vlach Grammar"). In the foreword to his work, Boiagi wrote: "Even if the Vlachs would claim, say, Hottentot origin, even in that case they ought to have the right and duty to cultivate themselves in their mother tongue, as the most appropriate way to fulfill their creed". The Metsovo-born Dimitrie Cozacovici would publish in 1865 in Bucharest the "Gramatica Romaneasca tra Romanilii dit drepta Dunarelei lucrata de D. Athanasescu, si typarita cu spesele D.D. Cosacovici, Roman din Metsova, spre an inaugura prima scoala Romana din Macedonia" ("Romanian Grammar to serve the Romanians South of the Danube worked by D. Athanasescu and printed from the donations of D.D. Cozacovici, Romanian of Metsovo, in order to inaugurate the first Romanian school of Macedonia").

A century later, almost 100 Romanian schools were opened in the Ottoman territories of Macedonia and Albania, starting as early as 1860. It is noted that this initiative was proposed by the Aromanian Diaspora living in Bucharest. The first nucleus of the Vlach schooling in Macedonia and Pindus was to be established in 1860 and its initiators were a group of Aromanians then living in Bucharest: D.D. Cozacovici (native of Metsovo), Zisu Sideri, Iordache Goga (native of Klissoura) and others. Together they initiated the Macedo-Romanian Cultural Society, under the endorsement of the then Romanian ruling class. The Macedo-Romanian Cultural Society had as its members (together with its Aromanian founding core represented by D.D. Cozacovici, Sideri, Goga, Grandea etc.) also the acting Prime and Foreign Ministers, as well as the Head of the Romanian Orthodox Church, and the elite of the Romanian political class: Mihail Kogălniceanu, Ion Ghica, Constantin Rosetti, etc.

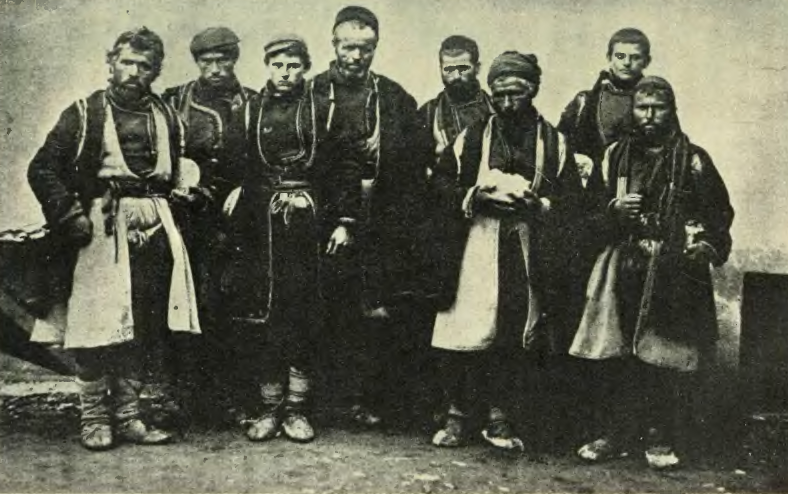
Macedonian Vlachs, circa 1914.

One of the greatest figures during the Aromanian awakening was Apostol Mărgărit, a native of Avdela in southern Macedonia, on the slopes of the Pindus mountains. As early as 1862, Apostol Mărgărit introduced the vernacular in the school of the large prosperous town of Klissoura (Vlaho-Klisura), in the Kastoria region of Macedonia. Nicepheros, the Greek bishop of Kastoria tried for many years to close down the school, but without success. In December, 1879, the first unsuccessful attempt on the life of Apostol Mărgărit took place. Mărgărit was wounded during a second attempt on his life during December 1890. There were Vlach schools in Klissoura, Krushevo, Nizepole, Trnovo, Gopesh, Ohrid, old Avdela in the Pindus mountains and new Avdela near Veria. Later more schools were founded in Macedonia, and then a Romanian high school for Aromanians was established in Bitola (Monastir) in the 1880s. The Greeks were naturally alarmed by the national reawakening of the Vlachs. At their peak, just before the Balkan Wars, there were 6 secondary gymnasiums, and 113 primary schools, teaching in Vlach. Due to the ongoing pressures from the Greek Church in the Ottoman provinces of Rumelia, Vlachs and their schools were viewed with suspicion. In 1880 Greek guerrillas attacked some villages near Resen because the village priests had committed the unpardonable sin of using Vlach in the church services. In the same year the Greek bishop of Kastoria had the schoolmaster in Klissoura arrested because he taught in the Vlachs' native language. In 1903, the Aromanian organization Society Farsharotu was founded in the United States. A momentous date in the history of the Vlachs was May 23, 1905, when the Sultan issued a decree officially recognizing the Vlachs and affirming their rights to maintain their schools and churches. Following the proclamation of the decree, the Greek bishops, and the armed bands they supported, unleashed a campaign of terror on the Aromanians to discourage them from taking advantage of their rights. In 1905, the Vlach abbot of the Holy Archangel monastery in the Meglen region was murdered by a Greek band. In the summer of 1905 some villages near Bitola were attacked. On October 27, 1905, Greek guerillas attacked the village of Avdela in the Pindus, birthplace of Apostol Mărgărit, and razed it to the ground. Then in 1906, in the town of Véria (Berea), the priest Papanace was murdered as he was on his way to church to serve the Divine Liturgy in Vlach. The Romanian Vlach school in the village of Avdhela in Pindus, which was one of the first Romanian sponsored Vlach schools, active as early as 1867, was burned and razed to the ground on 27 October 1905 by Greek guerrillas. This event prompted street anti-Greek demonstrations in Bucharest in the autumn of 1905 of the Aromanians living there, and a rupture of diplomatic relations between Romania and Greece.

Romania, with the support of Austro-Hungary, succeeded in the acceptance of the Aromanians ("Vlachs") as a separate millet (ethno-religious community) with the decree (irade, "spoken will") of May 22, 1905 by Sultan Abdulhamid, so the Ullah millet ("Vlach millet") could have its own churches and schools. This was a success of the Romanian national agitation policy in European Turkey in the last part of the 19th century. The day this event was announced, 23 May 1905 (the next day), is now commemorated as the Aromanian National Day.

Romania continued to subsidize schools until 1948, when the communist regime ended all links. George Padioti, an Aromanian author (born and living all his life in Greece) describes one of the last liturgy services in Vlach:

February 1952, the Aromanian Church 'Biserica ramana Santu Dumitru', burned by German troops in spring 1944. The priest Costa Bacou officiated the last allowed liturgy in Aromanian language. Afterwards, he was not permitted anymore because he refused to forcibly officiate the divine service in Greek language.

According to Sevold Braga in his treatise Die Aromunische Minderheit in Griechenland (Albumul Macedo-Roman II, Freiburg 1964), the Romanian help suddenly stopped with the coming of Communism. Braga's explanation was that in fact Romania had shown its true face, having used the Aromanians for its own purposes during the Ottoman rule, but afterwards throwing them away and disowning them.

Greek historians, when mentioning the Vlachs that attended the Romanian-sponsored churches and schools of Macedonia, Epirus and parts of Albania, describe them as being victims of Romanian propaganda, suggesting that they sent their children to schools where they were taught that they are Romanians.

The Vlachs, recognized as a separate nation by the 1878 Treaty of Berlin, were for the first time incorporated in Greece only in 1881, when Thessaly and a part of Epirus were offered to Greece by the Great Powers. Having been split into two by the new borders, the bulk of the Vlachs of these province petitioned the Great Powers of the time to be let to stay within the boundaries of the Ottoman Empire, but in vain. Greece followed a policy of creating a Greater Greece, according to the "Megali Idea". Most of the Aromanians became part of the Greek state in 1913 after the rest of Epirus and parts of Macedonia became part of Greece after the First Balkan War.

Roughly at the same time, the first studies regarding the Aromanians were published by western observers. Among these, names like Rebecca West, Osbert Lancaster or Sir Charles Eliot's are worth to be mentioned. Lancaster, who visited Greece in 1947, stated:

Although Metsovo, with its gigantic plane tree in the middle of the little square, its stone paved streets and abundant gardens, is typical of many a village in Epirus, in respect of its inhabitants it is unique. The Vlachs, to which race this people belong, are nomads, claiming with some degree of probability to partial descent from the Roman colonists of the Danube valley. In former times they were far more numerous than to-day, occupying the larger part of Thrace and Macedonia and establishing in the twelfth century a Bulgaro-Vlach empire in Thessaly which survived in practical independence until the coming of the Turk.

Although for the most part herdsmen, horse-breeder and shepherds following their beasts from pasture to pasture and living in temporary encampments of round wattle huts, the existence of urban settlements, of which Metsovo is the most considerable, would seem to afford evidence that, their nomadism is not natural but acquired. In general they are fairer in complexion and more industrious in their habits than the Greeks whom they affect to despise.

The Vlachs, this very interesting people are not Greek at all but a race of nomads, who come down from the Balkan lands in the winter with their flock and pass the cold months in Greece. They are shepherd by business, and their tribal name has become a sort of synonym for an ancient profession. Generally they are a people as kindly as they are picturesque, patriarchally hospitable and good sportsmen, as many an English Consul knows, and by no means ill favoured

=== The role of assimilated Aromanians in Greece ===
The hellenization of the Aromanians was notable long before the creation of an independent Greek state, and they have played a major role in the history of modern Greece. Rigas Velestinlis, born in 1757 and thought to have been of Aromanian descent, was a major figure of the Modern Greek Enlightenment and a pioneer of the Greek War of Independence, widely celebrated as a national hero in Greece. Aromanian revolutionaries of the Greek War of Independence include Giorgakis Olympios, Christodoulos Hatzipetros and more. Many wealthy Aromanians sponsored the Greek state and made great contributions to its development; George Averoff made various donations to Greek public institutions like the Hellenic Military Academy and the Athens Conservatoire, while he also financed the purchase of the warship which is named after him. Eleni Tositsa donated the land for the National Archaeological Museum to be built and her husband Michael Tositsas made great donations to the University of Athens. These three along with Nikolaos Stournaras, an Aromanian as well, also financed the creation of the National Metsovian Technical University of Athens. Additionally, Simon Sinas who financed the Academy of Athens, Georgios Sinas who financed the National Observatory of Athens, the University of Athens and the Arsakeio School, and Evangelos Zappas who financed the Panathenaic Stadium and the Zappeion Hall, are all thought to probably be of Aromanian descent. Ioannis Kolettis was an Aromanian who served twice as the Prime Minister of Greece during the first half of the 19th century and was the one who conceived the "Megali Idea", a nationalist and irredentist concept that was the core of Greek foreign policy until the early 20th century.

=== The two World Wars and the interbellum ===
During World War I, Italy and Romania opted for the creation of an Aromanian state in Greece, with a self proclaimed republic being created, the capital of which was Samarina. With many of the local Aromanians having adopted a Greek ethnic identity, it did not receive much support and was short lived. It was named the Samarina Republic by later historians.

The Inter-war period is of great interest regarding Aromanian history. The main event was the immigration of the Aromanians in the first decades of the 20th century. One of the reasons for the sudden departure of the Vlachs, had to do with the policies of the Greek state, who had to accommodate one and a half million of Greeks of Asia Minor following the 1923 exchange of populations between Greece and Turkey. In addition, the Romanian state had offered them land and privileges, in order to populate its new province of Dobruja, soon after annexing it from Bulgaria. The 25% of the region's population still traces its origins in Greece.

The last important episode concerns the Principality of Pindus. During World War II, the Italian occupation of Greece provided an opportunity for some Aromanians to create what they called "Vlach homeland". This fascist puppet state would not survive even nominally past Italy's exit from the war in September 1943.

=== Post-war situation in Greece ===
Aromanians today come after more than 50 years after the closure of the last school and church in the Vlach language. The old term "Vlachos" is still used as a "pejorative" by Greeks. After the Regime of the Colonels fell in 1974 however, the first local cultural organizations were formed to prevent the extinction of the language and culture. These organisations never had any government support. The Aromanian language had never been included in the educational curriculum of Greece, as it had always been considered a vulgar language. On the contrary, their use has been strongly discouraged. Such attitudes have led many Vlach parents to discourage their children from learning their mother tongue in order to avoid discrimination and maltreatment. Currently there is no education for Aromanian children in their mother tongue, and there are no public television or radio stations broadcasting fully or partially in Aromanian.

After pressure from the Union for Aromanian Language and Culture in Germany, the Parliamentary Assembly of the Council of Europe (PACE) examined a report on the Aromanians in 1997 which reported the critical situation of the Aromanian language and culture, and adopted Recommendation 1333 (1997) in which it was said that the Greek government, among others, should do whatever is necessary to respect their culture and facilitate education in Aromanian and to implement its use in schools, churches and the media. The Greek Vlachs oppose the introduction of the language into the education system as European Union and leading Greek political figures have suggested, viewing it as an artificial distinction between them and other Greeks. For example, the former education minister, George Papandreou, received a negative response from Aromanian mayors and associations to his proposal for a trial Aromanian language education programme. The Panhellenic Federation of Cultural Associations of Vlachs expressed strong opposition to PACE's recommendation in 1997 that the tuition of Aromanian be supported so as to avoid its extinction. On the other hand, there is a small minority within the community which strongly supports such efforts. On a visit to Metsovo, Epirus in 1998, the Greek President Costis Stephanopoulos called on Aromanians to speak and teach their language, so as not to be lost. There are currently no schools or churches teaching and holding services in Aromanian language.

While many Aromanians identify themselves as both Vlachs and Greeks, a small segment of the native Vlach inhabitants of Greece identify themselves as fully separate from the Greeks. This appears to be the case of some of the more remote villages of Pindus, where, sheltered somehow from contact with the dominant Greek culture, the older generation of the Vlachs converses in a separate language and customs. German academic Thede Kahl, whose broader perspective on the Aromanian community in Greece has been questioned by some nationalists, argues in his study "Ethnologica Balkanica ("The Ethnicity of Aromanians after 1990: the Identity of a Minority that Behaves like a Majority")":

There are still pro-Vlach Aromanians in Greece, especially in villages in which strong Vlach communities were once accepted by the Greek authorities, above all in Avdhela, Perivoli, Samarina, Vovusa, Krania, Edessa, Veria and surrounding areas, as well in a few villages in the district of Kastoria and Ioannina. On a whole, they are a minute and dwindling number of Aromanians.

Debate and discussion continues, with differing perspectives. Vlachs in Greece insist they are happy in practicing their dual identity. Some Vlachs outside Greece suggest difficulties may still be illustrated by the Sotiris Bletsas case. Bletsas was arrested in Greece while distributing copies of European Bureau for Lesser-Used Languages material covering linguistic minorities in Greece at an Aromanian festival in 1995. He was put on trial on 2 February 2001 and was first convicted, but was subsequently cleared on 18 October 2001.

== See also ==
- Aromanian language
- Aromanian question
- Vlachs
