= Stoica Lascu =

Romanian historian

- Born: 18 June 1951; Râmnicu de Jos, Romania
- Occupations: Historian, university professor

Academic background
- Education: University of Bucharest
- Thesis: Romanitatea balcanică în conștiința societății românești până la Primul Război Mondial (2000)
- Doctoral advisor: Stelian Brezeanu

Academic work
- Discipline: History of Romania and Dobruja, Aromanian studies including history, among others
- Institutions: Ovidius University of Constanța

Stoica Lascu (born 18 June 1951) is a Romanian historian. He has authored over a dozen books and over 250 studies and articles in journals and volumes from Romania and abroad. An Aromanian from Dobruja, he specializes in the history of Romania, of his native region and of the Aromanians, as well as in various other topics.

Lascu is a history professor at the Ovidius University of Constanța, in which he has held several important positions. He has participated in the editing of various journals and has written publications in numerous Romanian magazines and newspapers. He is also affiliated with a wide variety of academic and cultural associations, being the founder and president of two of them. Lascu is a recognized scholar and has received several awards for his works.

== Biography ==
=== Education and profession ===
Stoica Lascu was born on 18 June 1951 in the village of Râmnicu de Jos, Constanța County, Romania. He comes from an ethnic Aromanian family that settled in Romania's Southern Dobruja and had to emigrate to Northern Dobruja in 1940. Lascu studied his primary education at the General School of Râmnicu de Jos except for 8th grade, which he studied at the General School No. 4 in the city of Constanța. He then studied at the Tomis Technical High School (then known as the High School No. 4) in Constanța from 1966 to 1970 and then at the Faculty of History of the University of Bucharest from 1970 to 1974, graduating with the work Activitatea politică a lui Armand Călinescu ("The political activity of Armand Călinescu"). Lascu obtained a doctorate in history from the University of Bucharest in 2000 with the thesis Romanitatea balcanică în conștiința societății românești până la Primul Război Mondial ("Balkan Romanness in the consciousness of Romanian society until the First World War"), written under the direction of the Romanian historian Stelian Brezeanu.

By repartition of the Romanian communist government, Lascu was appointed teacher at the Camena General School in Baia, Tulcea County, where he taught from 1974 to 1975. He then worked at the Constanța History and Archaeology Museum from 1976 to 2003 as curator, principal curator or section director. Lascu has been enrolled in the staff of the Ovidius University of Constanța since 1 September 1992, first as lecturer from 1992 to 2004 and then as associate professor since 2004. Furthermore, he was scientific secretary from 1996 to 2000, head of the Department of Modern and Contemporary History from 2004 to 2005 and again from 2009 to 2011, dean from 1 October 2004 to 30 September 2005 and head of the Department of History of the Faculty of History and Political Sciences from 8 to 23 March 2012, also being member of the Senate of the University and of the Faculty Council as of 2013. As professor, Lascu has taught the fundamental subject of "Introduction to Modern Universal History" as well as other more specific subjects such as "Modern and Contemporary History of Dobruja", "Balkan Romanness in the Modern Era" and "History of Romanian Press (With a Special Focus on Dobruja)".

=== Academic research and publications ===
As of 2017, Lascu had authored 14 books (six as the single author, six as co-author and two as editor) and over 250 studies and articles, including 30 written in a language other than Romanian, in scientific journals and collective volumes not only from Romania but also from Albania, Austria, Bulgaria, Germany and North Macedonia. He has also participated in many academic conferences organized by institutes, museums, cultural and scientific associations and history faculties from Romania and abroad, having organized himself the annual Simpozionul Iorghiana ("Iorghiana Symposium") since 2001 as well as several other academic gatherings.

Romanian researchers Dorin Popescu and Liviu Franga summarized Lascu's academic interests in being the research of the modern and contemporary history of Romania, Dobruja and the "Balkan Romanness" (that is, the Aromanians, mainly). Other areas of his interest include the Romanian diaspora, the history of Romanian press, international relations in southeastern Europe in the modern era, the history of Albania and its relations with Romania, current historiography and its authors and the Romanian historian Nicolae Iorga and his works and publications. Lascu's research on Dobruja is particularly remarkable, with Romanian professor Ștefan Cucu defining Lascu as an "animator of Dobrujan cultural life". An example of his work is the 1985 micromonograph Constanța. Ghid de oraș ("Constanța. City guide"), which Lascu co-authored. In the chapter Repere în timp ("Highlights in time"), Lascu gives a vivid image of Constanța in the past through the testimonies of travellers, Romanians or not. He also describes the incorporation of Northern Dobruja into Romania in 1878, embellishing the event and making use of a "vibrant", "uplifting" language to recount it. In 1996, Lascu showed great admiration and enthusiasm for the Mircea cel Bătrân National College in Constanța and its graduate students in a special issue of the cultural magazine România de la Mare ("Romania of the Sea") dedicated to the centenary of the college's founding. In 1992, again at România de la Mare, Lascu published a 1919 document titled Memoriu asupra pagubelor făcute de inamic în orașul Constanța ("Memoir about the damages done by the enemy in the city of Constanța") about the "horrors" and "thousands of cases" of rapes, robberies and murders carried out by Bulgarians, Germans and Turks against the inhabitants of Constanța during the occupation of Romania by the Central Powers in World War I.

Lascu was editor from 1992 to 1997 of România de la Mare. He is also member since 2010 and 2012 respectively of the editorial board of Orizonturi istoriografice ("Historiographic Horizons"), a journal of the Ovidius University of Constanța, and of that of the North Macedonia-based Balkans-wide Haemus Journal. Furthermore, he is editor-in-chief of Analele Universității «Ovidius» din Constanța. Seria Istorie ("Annals of the "Ovidius" University of Constanța. History Series") since 2012. Starting from 1976, Lascu has written several articles, interviews and reviews and presentations of books in several Romanian almanacs, magazines and newspapers, including Contemporanul, Cuget Liber, Dosarele Istoriei, Ex Ponto, Magazin Istoric, Observator Cultural, Observator de Constanța, Picurarlu de la Pind, România de la Mare, România liberă, Telegraf, Tomis and several others.

=== Public figure and recognition ===
Lascu has been vice president from 1982 to 1986 and again from 1992 to 1998, head of its History Commission from 1986 to 1992 and president since 1992 of the Constanța County branch of the Society of Historical Studies of Romania (SȘIR). He is also the founder and president since 1991 and 1992 respectively of the România de la Mare Dobrujan Cultural–Historical Association and of the Picurarlu de la Pind ("The Shepherd of the Pindus") Aromanian Association of Dobruja. The latter is an Aromanian cultural organization which regards the Aromanians as ethnic Romanians. The Society Farsharotu, an Aromanian cultural organization in the United States, described Lascu as "one of the leading spokesmen" for the point of view that, because the Aromanians are ethnically Romanian, they can not possibly be recognized as an ethnic minority in Romania as some Aromanians have requested. Lascu has been a member of the Macedo-Romanian Cultural Society's board of directors since 1995, of the Nicolae Iorga Club of Historians since 2001, of the Romanian Association of History of the Press from 2009 to 2012, of the Association for Slavic, East European, and Eurasian Studies since 2009 and of the Austrian–Romanian Society (Österreichisch-Rumänische Gesellschaft) since 2010.

For his activities, Lascu has received several awards. On 23 November 2007, he received the Remus Opreanu Title from the Constanța County Prefecture for his "contribution in the field of local history". On 19 July 2008, he received the Nicolae Iorga Award from the SȘIR for his 2007 work Од историјата на ароманскиот печат во Македонија. Списанијата "Братсво" и "Светлина" ("On the history of the Aromanian press in Macedonia. The magazines Frățilia and Lumina"). On 26 April 2017, he received the Theodor Capidan Award from the Magazin Istoric Cultural Foundation, the publisher of the aforementioned Magazin Istoric, for his 2016 work Românii balcanici în Dobrogea ("Balkan Romanians in Dobruja"). In 2011, the community of historians of Constanța celebrated Lascu's 60th birthday. Such celebrations are a tradition in the community since 1999. The event included a conference on Dobruja and on "Carpatho-Ponto-Balkan Romanianism", and took place with the blessing of Teodosie Petrescu, Archbishop of Tomis.
