= Vassilis Rapotikas =

Aromanian paramilitary leader (1888–1943)

Vassilis Christou Rapotikas Vasil Rapotika
- Born: 1888; Gramos, Manastir Vilayet, Ottoman Empire (modern Greece)
- Died: May or June 1943; Grizano, Greece
- Military career
- Allegiance: Principality of Pindus; Kingdom of Italy
- Branch: Roman Legion
- Service years: 1941–1943

Vassilis Christou Rapotikas (1888–1943; Aromanian: Vasil Rapotika; Greek: Βασίλειος Χρήστου Ραποτίκας) was an Aromanian brigand and collaborationist paramilitary leader in Greece during World War II. He was among leaders of the Roman Legion of the short-lived Italian puppet state of Pindus, right behind Alcibiades Diamandi and Nicolaos Matussis. This unit sought to carve out a permanent and independent Aromanian state in the Greek regions of Thessaly and Macedonia. Rapotikas was killed in May or June 1943 by members of the Greek People's Liberation Army near Grizano.
