= Commemorative coins of Romania =

Romania România
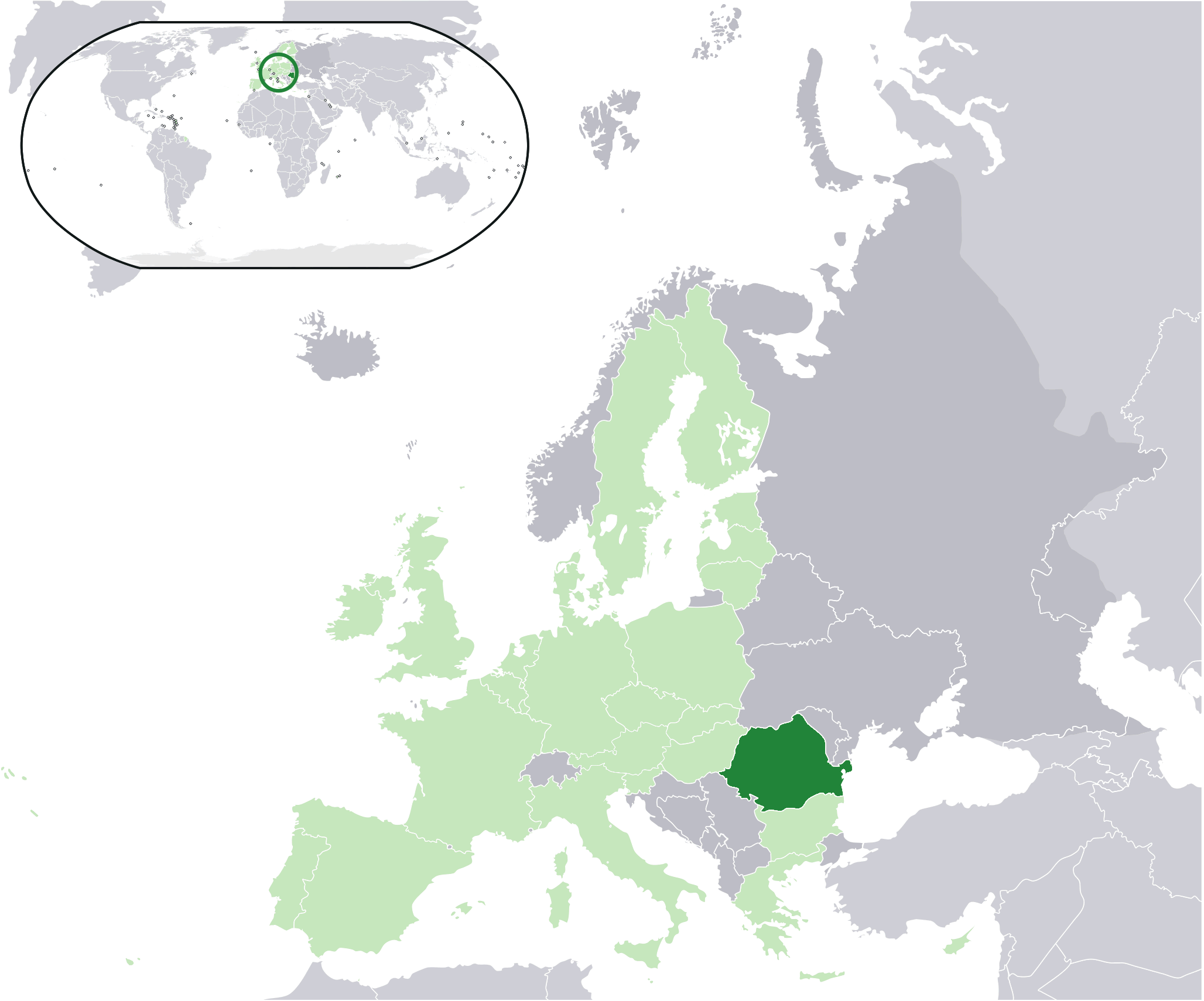
- ISO 3166 code: RO

Commemorative coins in Romania are special coins minted by the State Mint and issued by the National Bank of Romania (the only issuer of Romanian coins).

== 1906 ==
1906 commemorative coins
Images		Value	Technical parameters			Description			Date of issue	Mintage		Event/Collection	
Obverse	Reverse	Value	Diameter	Mass	Composition	Edge	Obverse	Reverse	Date of issue	Quality	Number	Event	Collection
		1 leu	23 mm	5 g	Silver 835‰	milled	Prince Carol as he appeared in 1866	King Carol as he appeared in 1906	1906	proof and circulated	2,500,000	40 years since the accession to the throne of King Carol I	
		5 lei			Silver 835‰	milled	Prince Carol as he appeared in 1866	King Carol as he appeared in 1906	1906	proof and circulated	200,000	40 years since the accession to the throne of King Carol I	
		12 ½ lei			Gold 900‰	milled	Crowned aquilla and motto: "PRIN STATORNICIE LA ISBÎNDĂ"	King Carol as he appeared in 1906	1906		32,000	40 years since the accession to the throne of King Carol I	
		20 lei	21 mm	6.452 g	Gold 900‰	milled	Prince Carol as he appeared in 1866	King Carol as he appeared in 1906	1906		15,000	40 years since the accession to the throne of King Carol I	
		25 lei			Gold 900‰	milled	Crowned aquilla and motto: "PRIN STATORNICIE LA ISBÎNDĂ"	King Carol as he appeared in 1906	1906		24,000	40 years since the accession to the throne of King Carol I	
		50 lei			Gold 900‰	milled	Princa Carol riding a horse	King Carol as he appeared in 1906	1906		28,000	40 years since the accession to the throne of King Carol I	
		100 lei			Gold 900‰	milled	Prince Carol as he appeared in 1866	King Carol as he appeared in 1906	1906		3,000	40 years since the accession to the throne of King Carol I	
These images are to scale at 2.5 pixels per millimetre. For table standards, see the coin specification table.

== 1941 ==
1941 commemorative coin
Images		Value	Technical parameters			Description			Date of issue	Mintage		Event/Collection	
Obverse	Reverse	Value	Diameter	Mass	Composition	Edge	Obverse	Reverse	Date of issue	Quality	Number	Event	Collection
		500 lei			Silver				1941			Re-unification of Romania with Bessarabia	
These images are to scale at 2.5 pixels per millimetre. For table standards, see the coin specification table.

== 1944 ==
Since there is no value given, some consider this a medal and not a coin. It respects all the technical specifications of a 20 lei gold coin in force at the time of issue.

1944 commemorative coin
Images		Value	Technical parameters			Description			Date of issue	Mintage		Event/Collection	
Obverse	Reverse	Value	Diameter	Mass	Composition	Edge	Obverse	Reverse	Date of issue	Quality	Number	Event	Collection
		20 lei	21 mm	6.55 g	Gold 900‰	NIHIL SINE DEO	Michael the Brave, Ferdinand I, Michael I	Coats of arms of the counties in Northern Transylvania	1944	proof	up to 1,000,000	Return to Romania of Northern Transylvania	
These images are to scale at 2.5 pixels per millimetre. For table standards, see the coin specification table.

== 1982 - 1983 ==
1982–1983 commemorative coins
Images		Value	Technical parameters			Description			Date of issue	Mintage		Event/Collection	
Obverse	Reverse	Value	Diameter	Mass	Composition	Edge	Obverse	Reverse	Date of issue	Quality	Number	Event	Collection
		50 lei			Silver		state title, communist coat of arms, year of minting	"2050 · ANI · DE · LA · CREAREA · STATULUI · DAC · CENTRALIZAT · ȘI · INDEPENDENT · 1980", battle scene	23 August 1983			2,050 years since the creation of the centralised and independent Dacian state	
		100 lei			Silver		state title, communist coat of arms, year of minting	"2050 · ANI · DE · LA · CREAREA · STATULUI · DAC · CENTRALIZAT · ȘI · INDEPENDENT · 1980", Burebista	23 August 1983			2,050 years since the creation of the centralised and independent Dacian state	
		500 lei			Gold		state title, communist coat of arms, year of minting	"2050 · ANI · DE · LA · CREAREA · STATULUI · DAC · CENTRALIZAT · ȘI · INDEPENDENT · 1980", battle scene	23 August 1983			2,050 years since the creation of the centralised and independent Dacian state	
		1000 lei			Gold		state title, communist coat of arms, year of minting	"2050 · ANI · DE · LA · CREAREA · STATULUI · DAC · CENTRALIZAT · ȘI · INDEPENDENT · 1980", Burebista	23 August 1983			2,050 years since the creation of the centralised and independent Dacian state	
These images are to scale at 2.5 pixels per millimetre. For table standards, see the coin specification table.

== 1995 ==
1995 commemorative coins
Images		Value	Technical parameters			Description			Date of issue	Mintage		Event/Collection	
Obverse	Reverse	Value	Diameter	Mass	Composition	Edge	Obverse	Reverse	Date of issue	Quality	Number	Event	Collection
		10 lei	24 mm	4.65 g	Nickel-plated steel	smooth			15 December 1995	BU	30,000	50 Years since the founding of FAO	
		10 lei	23 mm	4.65 g	Nickel-plated steel	smooth			15 December 1995	BU	30,000	50 Years since the founding of FAO	
		100 lei	37 mm	27.50 g	Silver 925‰	smooth			15 December 1995	BU	30,000	50 Years since the founding of FAO	
These images are to scale at 2.5 pixels per millimetre. For table standards, see the coin specification table.

== 1996 ==
1996 commemorative coins
Images		Value	Technical parameters			Description			Date of issue	Mintage		Event/Collection	
Obverse	Reverse	Value	Diameter	Mass	Composition	Edge	Obverse	Reverse	Date of issue	Quality	Number	Event	Collection
		10 lei	23 mm	4.65 g	Nickel-plated steel	smooth			14 June 1996	BU	11,500	1996 UEFA European Football Championship	
		100 lei	37 mm	27 g	Silver 925‰	smooth			14 June 1996	proof	11,500	1996 UEFA European Football Championship	
		10 lei	23 mm	4.65 g	Nickel-plated steel	smooth			31 July 1996	BU	19,600	Centenary of the modern Olympic Games	1996 Summer Olympics
		10 lei	23 mm	4.65 g	Nickel-plated steel	smooth			31 July 1996	BU	19,600	Surfing	1996 Summer Olympics
		10 lei	23 mm	4.65 g	Nickel-plated steel	smooth			31 July 1996	BU	19,600	Canoe	1996 Summer Olympics
		10 lei	23 mm	4.65 g	Nickel-plated steel	smooth			31 July 1996	BU	19,600	Swimming	1996 Summer Olympics
		10 lei	23 mm	4.65 g	Nickel-plated steel	smooth			31 July 1996	BU	19,600	Yachting	1996 Summer Olympics
		10 lei	23 mm	4.65 g	Nickel-plated steel	smooth			31 July 1996	BU	19,600	Kayak-Canoe	1996 Summer Olympics
		100 lei	37 mm	27 g	Silver 925‰	smooth			31 July 1996	proof	19,600	Centenary of the modern Olympic Games	1996 Summer Olympics
		100 lei	37 mm	27 g	Silver 925‰	smooth			31 July 1996	proof	19,600	Surfing	1996 Summer Olympics
		100 lei	37 mm	27 g	Silver 925‰	smooth			31 July 1996	proof	19,600	Canoe	1996 Summer Olympics
		100 lei	37 mm	27 g	Silver 925‰	smooth			31 July 1996	proof	19,600	Swimming	1996 Summer Olympics
		100 lei	37 mm	27 g	Silver 925‰	smooth			31 July 1996	proof	19,600	Yachting	1996 Summer Olympics
		100 lei	37 mm	27 g	Silver 925‰	smooth			31 July 1996	proof	19,600	Kayak-Canoe	1996 Summer Olympics
		10 lei	23 mm	4.65 g	Nickel-plated steel	smooth			11 November 1996	BU	50,000	Conferinţa mondială F.A.O., Roma 1996	
		100 lei	37 mm	27.50 g	Silver 925‰	smooth			11 November 1996	proof	5,000	Conferinţa mondială F.A.O., Roma 1996	
These images are to scale at 2.5 pixels per millimetre. For table standards, see the coin specification table.

== 1997 ==
1997 commemorative coins
Images		Value	Technical parameters			Description			Date of issue	Mintage		Event/Collection	
Obverse	Reverse	Value	Diameter	Mass	Composition	Edge	Obverse	Reverse	Date of issue	Quality	Number	Event	Collection
		100 lei	37 mm	27 g	Silver 925‰	smooth			24 April 1997	proof	5,000	Half-centenary of UNICEF	
These images are to scale at 2.5 pixels per millimetre. For table standards, see the coin specification table.

== 1998 ==
1998 commemorative coins
Images		Value	Technical parameters			Description			Date of issue	Mintage		Event/Collection	
Obverse	Reverse	Value	Diameter	Mass	Composition	Edge	Obverse	Reverse	Date of issue	Quality	Number	Event	Collection
		100 lei	37 mm	27 g	Silver 925‰	smooth			19 February 1998	proof	13,500	Bobsleigh	1998 Winter Olympics
		100 lei	37 mm	27 g	Silver 925‰	smooth			19 February 1998	proof	13,500	Figure skating	1998 Winter Olympics
		100 lei	37 mm	27 g	Silver 925‰	smooth			19 February 1998	proof	13,500	Slalom skiing	1998 Winter Olympics
		100 lei	37 mm	27 g	Silver 925‰	smooth			1 June 1996	proof	5,000	1998 FIFA World Cup	
		500 lei	24 mm	8.64 g	Gold 900‰	smooth			29 July 1996	proof	2,000	150 years since the Wallachian Revolution of 1848	
		1,000 lei	35 mm	31.1030 g	Gold 999‰	smooth			29 July 1996	proof	1,000	150 years since the Wallachian Revolution of 1848	
		1,000 lei	35 mm	31.1030 g	Gold 999‰	smooth			1 December 1998	proof	3,000	Anniversary of the Great Union of 1 December 1918	
		100 lei	37 mm	27 g	Silver 925‰	smooth			12 December 1998	proof	5,000	Anniversary of the Independence of Romania	
		100 lei	37 mm	27 g	Silver 925‰	smooth			30 December 1998	proof	2,000	Commemoration of 125 years since the death of Mitropolite Andrei Şaguna	
These images are to scale at 2.5 pixels per millimetre. For table standards, see the coin specification table.

== 1999 ==
1999 commemorative coins
Images		Value	Technical parameters			Description			Date of issue	Mintage		Event/Collection	
Obverse	Reverse	Value	Diameter	Mass	Composition	Edge	Obverse	Reverse	Date of issue	Quality	Number	Event	Collection
		100 lei	37 mm	27 g	Silver 925‰	smooth			7 May 1999	proof	2,000	Visit of Pope John Paul II in Romania	
		1,000 lei	35 mm	31.1030 g	Gold 999‰	smooth			7 May 1999	proof	1,000	Visit of Pope John Paul II in Romania	
		500 lei	25 mm	3.75 g	Magnesium – Aluminium alloy (AlMg_{3})	"ROMANIA ♦ ROMANIA ♦ ROMANIA ♦"			11 August 1999	BU	3,000,000	Total Solar eclipse of 11 August 1999	
		500 lei	25 mm	3.75 g	Magnesium – Aluminium alloy (AlMg_{3})	"ROMANIA ♦ ROMANIA ♦ ROMANIA ♦"			11 August 1999	proof	3,000	Total Solar eclipse of 11 August 1999	
		100 lei	37 mm	27 g	Silver 925‰	smooth			25 August 1999	proof	20,000	100 years since the Belgian Antarctic Expedition, with the participation of Emil Racoviţă	
		100 lei	35 mm	31.103 g	Gold 999‰	milled			24 December 1999	proof	25,000	Gold helmet from Poiana Coţofeneşti	History of gold
These images are to scale at 2.5 pixels per millimetre. For table standards, see the coin specification table.

== 2000 ==
2000 commemorative coins
Images		Value	Technical parameters			Description			Date of issue	Mintage		Event/Collection	
Obverse	Reverse	Value	Diameter	Mass	Composition	Edge	Obverse	Reverse	Date of issue	Quality	Number	Event	Collection
		2,000 lei	35 mm	31.1030 g	Gold 999‰	smooth			24 April 2000	proof	1,500	150 years since the birth of Mihai Eminescu	
		5,000 lei	35 mm	31.1030 g	Gold 999‰	smooth			1 August 2000	proof	1,500	400 years since the union of Wallachia, Transylvania, and Moldavia under the rule of Mihai Viteazul	
		500 lei	37 mm	27 g	Silver 925‰	smooth			2 October 2000	proof	1,000	600 years since Alexandru cel Bun was enthroned Domnitor of Moldavia	
		5,000 lei	35 mm	31.103 g	Gold 999‰	smooth			27 December 2000	proof	1,000	2,000 years of Christianity	
These images are to scale at 2.5 pixels per millimetre. For table standards, see the coin specification table.

== 2001 ==
2001 commemorative coins
Images		Value	Technical parameters			Description			Date of issue	Mintage		Event/Collection	
Obverse	Reverse	Value	Diameter	Mass	Composition	Edge	Obverse	Reverse	Date of issue	Quality	Number	Event	Collection
		5,000 lei	35 mm	31.1030 g	Gold 999‰	smooth			15 March 2001	proof	500	125 years since the birth of the sculptor Constantin Brâncuși	
		1,000 lei	27 mm	15,551 g	Gold 999‰	smooth			4 June 2001	proof	500	1,900 years since the first Dacian War	
		50 lei	111 mm, octagonal	15,551 g	Silver 999‰	smooth			31 August 2001	proof	500	Traian Vuia	Romanian Aviation pioneers
		50 lei	111 mm, octagonal	15,551 g	Silver 999‰	smooth			31 August 2001	proof	500	Henri Coandă	Romanian Aviation pioneers
		50 lei	111 mm, octagonal	15,551 g	Silver 999‰	smooth			31 August 2001	proof	500	Elie Carafoli	Romanian Aviation pioneers
		500 lei	octagonal, 9 mm each side	6,22 g	Gold 999‰	smooth			20 December 2001	proof	250	Pietroasele Treasure – Great fibulae (cloșca)	History of Gold
		500 lei	octagonal, 9 mm each side	6,22 g	Gold 999‰	smooth			20 December 2001	proof	250	Pietroasele Treasure – Middle fibulae (puii)	History of Gold
		500 lei	octagonal, 9 mm each side	6,22 g	Gold 999‰	smooth			20 December 2001	proof	250	Pietroasele Treasure – Dodecagonal bowl	History of Gold
		500 lei	octagonal, 9 mm each side	6,22 g	Gold 999‰	smooth			20 December 2001	proof	250	Pietroasele Treasure – Oenochoe bowl	History of Gold
These images are to scale at 2.5 pixels per millimetre. For table standards, see the coin specification table.

== 2002 ==
2002 commemorative coins
Images		Value	Technical parameters			Description			Date of issue	Mintage		Event/Collection	
Obverse	Reverse	Value	Diameter	Mass	Composition	Edge	Obverse	Reverse	Date of issue	Quality	Number	Event	Collection
		5,000 lei	35 mm	31.1030 g	Gold 999‰	smooth			11 March 2002	proof	250	150 years since the birth of Ion Luca Caragiale	
		2,000 lei	35 mm	25 g	Ring: gold 999‰ Center: silver 999‰	milled			27 May 2002	proof	500	200 years since the birth of Ion Heliade Rădulescu	
		50 lei	27.71 mm, triangular	15.551 g	Silver 999‰	smooth			16 September 2002	proof	500	Retezat National Park	National Parks and Reservations in Romania
		50 lei	27.71 mm, triangular	15.551 g	Silver 999‰	smooth			16 September 2002	proof	500	Pietrosul Mare	National Parks and Reservations in Romania
		50 lei	27.71 mm, triangular	15.551 g	Silver 999‰	smooth			16 September 2002	proof	500	Piatra Craiului	National Parks and Reservations in Romania
		500 lei	square, 23.19 mm side length	6.22 g	Gold 999‰	smooth			16 December 2002	proof	250	Bistriţa Monastery	Medieval Christian Monuments
		500 lei	square, 23.19 mm side length	6.22 g	Gold 999‰	smooth			16 December 2002	proof	250	Colţea Church	Medieval Christian Monuments
		500 lei	square, 23.19 mm side length	6.22 g	Gold 999‰	smooth			16 December 2002	proof	250	Mogoşoaia Palace	Medieval Christian Monuments
These images are to scale at 2.5 pixels per millimetre. For table standards, see the coin specification table.

== 2003 ==
2003 commemorative coins
Images		Value	Technical parameters			Description			Date of issue	Mintage		Event/Collection	
Obverse	Reverse	Value	Diameter	Mass	Composition	Edge	Obverse	Reverse	Date of issue	Quality	Number	Event	Collection
		100 lei	13.91 mm	1.224 g	Gold 999‰	milled			14 March 2003	proof	2,000	Apahida vulture	History of gold
		500 lei	37 mm	31.103 g	Silver 999‰	ornamental			21 July 2003	proof	500	150 years since the birth of Ciprian Porumbescu	
		500 lei	37 mm	31.103 g	Silver 999‰	smooth			22 September 2003	proof	500	500 years since the founding of the Bishopyric of Râmnic	
		5,000 lei	37 mm	31.103 g	Gold 999‰	ornamental			20 October 2003	proof	250	625 years since the construction of Bran Castle	
		50 lei	27 mm	15.551 g	Silver 999‰	smooth			27 November 2003	proof	500	Pelecanus crispus	international year of pure water – Danube Delta Reservation
		50 lei	27 mm	15.551 g	Silver 999‰	smooth			27 November 2003	proof	500	Egretta alba	international year of pure water – Danube Delta Reservation
		50 lei	27 mm	15.551 g	Silver 999‰	smooth			27 November 2003	proof	500	Alcedo atthis	international year of pure water – Danube Delta Reservation
		500 lei	37 mm	31,103 g	Silver 999‰	smooth			22 December 2003	proof	500	Centenary of the Romanian Numismatic Society	
These images are to scale at 2.5 pixels per millimetre. For table standards, see the coin specification table.

== 2004 ==
2004 commemorative coins
Images		Value	Technical parameters			Description			Date of issue	Mintage		Event/Collection	
Obverse	Reverse	Value	Diameter	Mass	Composition	Edge	Obverse	Reverse	Date of issue	Quality	Number	Event	Collection
		5,000 lei	35 mm	31.1030 g	Gold 999‰	smooth			19 April 2004	proof	250	500 years since the death of Ştefan cel Mare	
		500 lei	37 mm dodecagonal	31.1030 g	Silver 999‰	smooth			5 July 2004	proof	500	Cotroceni monastery church	Medieval Christian Monuments
		500 lei	37 mm dodecagonal	31.1030 g	Silver 999‰	smooth			5 July 2004	proof	500	Trei Ierarhi Church, Iaşi	Medieval Christian Monuments
		500 lei	37 mm	31.1030 g	Silver 999‰	smooth			13 September 2004	proof	500	150 years since the birth of Anghel Saligny	
		500 lei	37 mm	31.1030 g	Silver 999‰	smooth			27 September 2004	proof	500	140 years since the founding of the University of Bucharest	
		100 lei	13.92 mm	1.224 g	Gold 999‰	milled			29 November 2004	proof	1,000	Cantacuzinian engolpion	History of gold
These images are to scale at 2.5 pixels per millimetre. For table standards, see the coin specification table.

== 2005 ==
2005 commemorative coins
Images		Value	Technical parameters			Description			Date of issue	Mintage		Event/Collection	
Obverse	Reverse	Value	Diameter	Mass	Composition	Edge	Obverse	Reverse	Date of issue	Quality	Number	Event	Collection
		20 lei	21 mm	6.452 g	Gold 900‰	milled			1 January 2005	proof	250	History of the Romanian coinage – replica of the first pol (equal to 20 lei)	
		koson	20 mm	8.5 g	Gold 999‰	irregular			21 February 2005	proof	250	History of the Romanian coinage – replica of a koson (Dacian coin)	
		500 lei	37 mm	31.1030 g	Silver 999‰	smooth			8 April 2005	proof	500	125 years since the founding of the National Bank of Romania	
		500 lei	35 mm	31.1030 g	Gold 999‰	smooth			26 September 2005	proof	250	50 years since the death of George Enescu	
		10 lei	13.92 mm	1.224 g	Gold 999‰	milled			5 December 2005	proof	1,000	Perşinari Treasure	History of gold
		5 lei	13.92 mm	31.103 g	Silver 999‰	milled			27 December 2005	proof	150	100 years since the birth of Grigore Vasiliu Birlic	
These images are to scale at 2.5 pixels per millimetre. For table standards, see the coin specification table.

== 2006 ==
2006 commemorative coins
Images		Value	Technical parameters			Description			Date of issue	Mintage		Event/Collection	
Obverse	Reverse	Value	Diameter	Mass	Composition	Edge	Obverse	Reverse	Date of issue	Quality	Number	Event	Collection
		1 leu	37 mm	23.5 g	Copper-plated tombac	smooth			31 March 2006	proof	35	140 years since the founding of the Romanian Academy	
		5 lei	37 mm	31.103 g	Silver 999‰	smooth			31 March 2006	proof	500	140 years since the founding of the Romanian Academy	
		50 lei	21 mm	6.452 g	Gold 900‰	smooth			31 March 2006	proof	35	140 years since the founding of the Romanian Academy	
			34.7 mm	17.349 g	Gold 900‰	smooth			19 May 2006	proof	250	Coin/medal issued by Constantin Brâncoveanu in 1713 (replica)	
		5 lei	37 mm	31.103 g	Silver 999‰	smooth			24 July 2006	proof	500	The wooden church of Ieud-Deal	Medieval Christian Monuments
		5 lei	37 mm	31.103 g	Silver 999‰	smooth			21 August 2006	proof	500	150 years since the Internationalization of the Danube River and the creation of the European Danube Commission	
		500 lei	35 mm	31.103 g	Gold 999‰	smooth			4 September 2006	proof	250	350 years since the building of the Patriarchal Cathedral	
			19 mm	3.157 g	Silver 999‰	irregular			18 September 2006	BU	500	Denarius, Trajan	Replicas of Roman coinage
			20 mm	7.243 g	Gold 999‰	irregular			18 September 2006	BU	250	Aureus, Trajan	Replicas of Roman coinage
			20 mm	7.38 g	Gold 999‰	irregular			18 September 2006	BU	250	Aureus, Hadrian	Replicas of Roman coinage
			33 mm	24 g	Tombac	irregular			18 September 2006	BU	500	Sestertius, Trajan	Replicas of Roman coinage
		10 lei	13.92 mm	1.2240 g	Gold 999‰	milled			16 October 2006	proof	500	Cucuteni Băiceni Treasure	History of gold
		5 lei	37 mm	31.103 g	Silver 999‰	smooth			13 November 2006	proof	500	Densuş Church	
		5 lei	37 mm	31.103 g	Silver 999‰	milled			11 December 2006	proof	500	Nomination of Sibiu as European Capital of Culture in 2007	
These images are to scale at 2.5 pixels per millimetre. For table standards, see the coin specification table.

== 2007 ==
2007 commemorative coins
Images		Value	Technical parameters			Description			Date of issue	Mintage		Event/Collection	
Obverse	Reverse	Value	Diameter	Mass	Composition	Edge	Obverse	Reverse	Date of issue	Quality	Number	Event	Collection
		500 lei	35 mm	31.1030 g	Gold 999‰	milled			3 January 2007	proof	250	Accession of Romania to the European Union	
		500 lei	35 mm	31.1030 g	Gold 999‰	milled			22 January 2007	proof	250	Nicolae Bălcescu	
		1 leu	37 mm	23.25 g	Copper-plated tombac	milled			26 March 2007	proof	250	Centenary of the birth of Mircea Eliade	
		5 lei	30 mm	15.55 g	Silver 999‰	milled			26 March 2007	proof	250	Centenary of the birth of Mircea Eliade	
		10 lei	21 mm	6.452 g	Gold 999‰	milled			26 March 2007	proof	250	Centenary of the birth of Mircea Eliade	
		1 banu	15 mm	1.75 g	Gold 999‰	smooth			25 April 2007	BU	250	Gold replicas of subdivisional coins from 1867	
		2 bani	20 mm	3.5 g	Gold 999‰	smooth			25 April 2007	BU	250	Gold replicas of subdivisional coins from 1867	
		5 bani	20 mm	8.65 g	Gold 999‰	smooth			25 April 2007	BU	250	Gold replicas of subdivisional coins from 1867	
		10 bani	30 mm	17.2010 g	Gold 999‰	smooth			25 April 2007	BU	250	Gold replicas of subdivisional coins from 1867	
		10 centime	30 mm	10 g	Copper-plated tombac	milled			25 April 2007	BU	250	Replicas of coins designed during Alexandru Ioan Cuza; roman, divided in 100 centime. Planned in 1860, never issued.	
		5 romani	27 mm	25 g	Silver 925‰	milled			25 April 2007	BU	250	Replicas of coins designed during Alexandru Ioan Cuza; roman, divided in 100 centime. Planned in 1860, never issued.	
		20 romani	21 mm	6.452 g	Gold 900‰	milled			25 April 2007	BU	250	Replicas of coins designed during Alexandru Ioan Cuza; roman, divided in 100 centime. Planned in 1860, never issued.	
		10 lei	37 mm	31.103 g	Silver 999‰	milled			10 May 2007	proof	500	50th anniversary of the Treaty of Rome	
		1 leu	37 mm	23.5 g	Copper-plated tombac	milled			18 June 2007	proof	250	Dimitrie Cantemir	
		5 lei	30 mm	15.55 g	Silver 999‰	milled			18 June 2007	proof	250	Dimitrie Cantemir	
		100 lei	21 mm	6.452 g	Gold 900‰	milled			18 June 2007	proof	250	Dimitrie Cantemir	
		1 leu	37 mm	23.5 g	Copper-plated tombac	milled			2 July 2007	proof	250	Ştefan cel Mare	
		5 lei	30 mm	15.55 g	Silver 999‰	milled			2 July 2007	proof	250	Ştefan cel Mare	
		100 lei	21 mm	6.452 g	Gold 900‰	milled			2 July 2007	proof	250	Ştefan cel Mare	
		1 leu	37 mm	23.5 g	Copper-plated tombac	milled			20 August 2007	proof	130	130th Anniversary of the Independence of Romania	
		5 lei	30 mm	15.551 g	Silver 999‰	milled			20 August 2007	proof	130	130th Anniversary of the Independence of Romania	
		100 lei	21 mm	6.452 g	Gold 900‰	milled			20 August 2007	proof	130	130th Anniversary of the Independence of Romania	
		10 lei	37 mm	31.103 g	Silver 999‰	milled			3 September 2007	proof	500	150 years of Romanian petrol industry	
		100 lei	21 mm	6.452 g	Gold 900‰	milled			29 October 2007	proof	250	90 years since the victories of the Romanian Army at Mărăşti, Mărăşeşti & Oituz	
		10 lei	13.92 mm	1.224 g	Gold 900‰	milled			28 December 2007	proof	500	The rhyton from Poroina	
These images are to scale at 2.5 pixels per millimetre. For table standards, see the coin specification table.

== 2008 ==
2008 commemorative coins
Images		Value	Technical parameters			Description			Date of issue	Mintage		Event/Collection	
Obverse	Reverse	Value	Diameter	Mass	Composition	Edge	Obverse	Reverse	Date of issue	Quality	Number	Event	Collection
		1 leu	37 mm	25.50 g	Copper-plated tombac	milled			3 March 2008	proof	1,000	2,000 years since the exile of Ovid to Tomis	
		5 lei	30 mm	15.55 g	Silver 999‰	milled			3 March 2008	proof	500	2,000 years since the exile of Ovid to Tomis	
		100 lei	21 mm	6.4520 g	Gold 900‰	milled			3 March 2008	proof	250	2,000 years since the exile of Ovid to Tomis	
		1 leu	37 mm	23.50 g	Copper-plated tombac	milled			28 March 2008	proof	500	NATO summit of Bucharest	
		5 lei	30 mm	15.55 g	Silver 999‰	milled			28 March 2008	proof	500	NATO summit of Bucharest	
		100 lei	21 mm	6.4520 g	Gold 900‰	milled			28 March 2008	proof	500	NATO summit of Bucharest	
		10 lei	37 mm	31.1030 g	Silver 999‰	milled			5 May 2008	proof	1,000	150 years since the first emission of Cap de Bour stamps	
		10 lei	37 mm	31.1030 g	Silver 999‰	milled			6 June 2008	proof		100 years since the birth of Costin Kiriţescu	
		10 lei	37 mm	31.1030 g	Silver 999‰	milled			7 July 2008	proof	500	500 years since the first printing on Romanian soil at Dealu Monastery	
		10 lei	37 mm	31.1030 g	Silver 999‰	milled			11 August 2008	proof	500	200 years since the birth of Simion Bărnuţiu	
		10 lei	37 mm	31.1030 g	Silver 999‰	milled			20 October 2008	proof	500	Brâncoveanu Monastery	Medieval Christian Monuments
		10 lei	37 mm	31.1030 g	Silver 999‰	milled			20 October 2008	proof	500	Voroneţ Monastery	Medieval Christian Monuments
		10 lei	37 mm	31.1030 g	Silver 999‰	milled			20 October 2008	proof	500	Cozia Monastery	Medieval Christian Monuments
		10 lei	37 mm	31.1030 g	Silver 999‰	milled			27 October 2008	proof	500	80 years since the founding of the Romanian Radio Broadcasting Company	
		500 lei	35 mm	31.1030 g	Gold 999‰	milled	Nominal value, year of issue, coat of arms of Romania, laurel wreath, "ROMANIA".	"NIHIL SINE DEO", Steel Crown of Romania, the years "1918" and "2008", "1 DECEMBRIE", laurel wreath	28 November 2008	proof	3,000	90th anniversary of the Great Union of 1 December 1918	90th anniversary of the Great Union of 1 December 1918
		20 lei	21 mm	6.4520 g	Gold 900‰	milled	Effigy of King Ferdinand I wearing a laurel wreath, "FERDINAND I REGELE ROMANILOR", 1922, name of the engraver, "R" standing for "replica".	middle coat of arms of The Kingdom of Romania, "ROMANIA", 1922	28 November 2008	BU	500	Replica of the 1922 golden coin	90th anniversary of the Great Union of 1 December 1918
		10 lei	13.92 mm	1.2240 g	Gold 999‰	milled			24 December 2008	proof	500	Hinova Treasure	
These images are to scale at 2.5 pixels per millimetre. For table standards, see the coin specification table.

== 2009 ==
2009 commemorative coins
Images		Value	Technical parameters			Description			Date of issue	Mintage		Event/Collection	
Obverse	Reverse	Value	Diameter	Mass	Composition	Edge	Obverse	Reverse	Date of issue	Quality	Number	Event	Collection
		10 lei	37 mm	31.103 g	Silver 999‰	milled			16 January 2009	proof	1,000	10 years since the founding of the EMU and the launching of the Euro	
		500 lei	35 mm	31.103 g	Gold 999‰	smooth			23 January 2009	proof	250	150 years since the Union of the Principalities	
		500 lei	35 mm	31.103 g	Gold 999‰	smooth	Stema României, anul de emisiune - 2009 şi valoarea nominală - 500 LEI, castelul Peleş într-o ghirlandă de laur şi inscripţia circulară "ROMANIA"	În centru, portretul regelui Carol I şi stema mare a regatului României, în stânga şi în dreapta anii 1839 şi 2009, iar la exterior, inscripţiile circulare "NIHIL SINE DEO" - sus şi "CAROL I REGE" - jos	15 April 2009	proof	250	170 years since the birth of King Carol I	
		10 lei	37 mm	31.103 g	Silver 999‰	milled			20 May 2009	proof	500	155 years since the birtgh of Alexandru Macedonski	
		10 lei	37 mm	31.103 g	Silver 999‰	milled			24 June 2009	proof	500	650 years since the founding of the Metropolis of Wallachia	
		10 lei	37 mm	31.103 g	Silver 999‰	milled			15 July 2009	proof	500	150 years since the founding of the National Office of Statistics by Alexandru Ioan Cuza	
		10 lei	37 mm	31.103 g	Silver 999‰	milled			5 August 2009	proof	500	140 years since the inauguration of the first Romanian railroad Bucharest - Giurgiu	
		1 leu	37 mm	23.50 g	Copper-plated tombac	milled			16 September 2009	proof	1,000	Vlad Țepeș - 550 years since the first documentet mention of Bucharest	
		10 lei	37 mm	31.103 g	Silver 999‰	milled			16 September 2009	proof	500	Vlad Țepeș - 550 years since the first documentet mention of Bucharest	
		500 lei	35 mm	31.103 g	Gold 999‰	smooth			16 September 2009	proof	250	Vlad Țepeș - 550 years since the first documentet mention of Bucharest	
		10 lei	37 mm	31.103 g	Silver 999‰	milled			7 October 2009	proof	500	100 years since the founding of the Port of Constanţa	
		10 lei	37 mm	31.103 g	Silver 999‰	milled			21 October 2009	proof	500	1,900 years since the inauguration of the Adamclisi monument	
		1 leu	37 mm	23,5 g	Copper-plated tombac	milled			12 November 2009	proof	500	150 years since the founding of the Romanian General Staff	
		10 lei	30 mm	15.55 g	Silver 925‰	milled			12 November 2009	proof	500	150 years since the founding of the Romanian General Staff	
		100 lei	21 mm	6.452 g	Gold 999‰	milled			12 November 2009	proof	250	150 years since the founding of the Romanian General Staff	
		10 lei	37 mm	31.103 g	Silver 999‰	milled			25 November 2009	proof	500	Timișoara - the first European city with electric public illumination	
		10 lei	37 mm	31.103 g	Silver 999‰	milled			16 December 2009	proof	500	300 years since the birth of bishop Petru Pavel Aron	
		1 leu	37 mm	23.5 g	Copper-plated tombac	smooth			30 December 2009	proof	1,000	190 years since the birth of Nicolae Bălcescu	
		10 lei	37 mm	31.103 g	Silver 999‰	smooth			30 December 2009	proof	1,000	190 years since the birth of Nicolae Bălcescu	
		500 lei	35 mm	31.103 g	Gold 999‰	smooth			30 December 2009	proof	500	190 years since the birth of Nicolae Bălcescu	
These images are to scale at 2.5 pixels per millimetre. For table standards, see the coin specification table.

== 2010 ==
2010 commemorative coins
Images		Value	Technical parameters			Description			Date of issue	Mintage		Event/Collection	
Obverse	Reverse	Value	Diameter	Mass	Composition	Edge	Obverse	Reverse	Date of issue	Quality	Number	Event	Collection
		10 lei	13.92 mm	1.224 g	Gold 999‰	milled			10 February 2010	proof	500	Gepidic treasure from Someşeni, Cluj	History of gold
		500 lei	35 mm	31.103 g	Gold 999‰	smooth			12 April 2010	proof	500	160 years since the birth of Mihai Eminescu	
		1 leu	37 mm	23.5 g	Copper-plated tombac	smooth	Year of issue, the new National Bank Palace, Coat of arms of Romania, value, "ROMANIA"	Funding year (1880), the old National Bank Palace, bank's logo on a shield with ornaments, "130 ANI" "BANCA NATIONALA A ROMANIEI"	30 April 2010	proof	1,500	130 years since the funding of the National Bank of Romania	
		10 lei	37 mm	31.103 g	Silver 999‰	smooth	Year of issue, the new National Bank Palace, Coat of arms of Romania, value, "ROMANIA"	Funding year (1880), the old National Bank Palace, bank's logo on a shield with ornaments, "130 ANI" "BANCA NATIONALA A ROMANIEI"	30 April 2010	proof	3,000	130 years since the funding of the National Bank of Romania	
		200 lei	27 mm	15.551 g	Gold 999‰	smooth	Year of issue, the new National Bank Palace, Coat of arms of Romania, value, "ROMANIA"	Funding year (1880), the old National Bank Palace, bank's logo on a shield with ornaments, "130 ANI" "BANCA NATIONALA A ROMANIEI"	30 April 2010	proof	1,500	130 years since the funding of the National Bank of Romania	
		100 lei	21 mm	6.452 g	Gold 900‰	milled			30 April 2010	proof	500	Eugeniu Carada - founder of the National Bank	
		200 lei	27 mm	15.551 g	Gold 999‰	smooth			14 June 2010	proof	1,000	125 years since the autocephaly of the Romanian Orthodox Church and 85 years since the founding of the Patriarchate	
		10 lei	37 mm	31.103 g	Silver 999‰	milled	Patriarchal Palace, "PALATUL PATRIARHAL", "ROMANIA", nominal value - "10 LEI", coat of arms of Romania, year of issue "2010"	Portrait of the Patriarch, years of birth and death, coat of arms of the Romanian Patriarchy, "PATRIARHUL NAME LASTNAME"	19 July 2010	proof	1,000	Miron Cristea	Five silver coins set dedicated to the Patriarchs of All Romania
		10 lei	37 mm	31.103 g	Silver 999‰	milled	Patriarchal Palace, "PALATUL PATRIARHAL", "ROMANIA", nominal value - "10 LEI", coat of arms of Romania, year of issue "2010"	Portrait of the Patriarch, years of birth and death, coat of arms of the Romanian Patriarchy, "PATRIARHUL NAME LASTNAME"	19 July 2010	proof	1,000	Nicodim Munteanu	Five silver coins set dedicated to the Patriarchs of All Romania
		10 lei	37 mm	31.103 g	Silver 999‰	milled	Patriarchal Palace, "PALATUL PATRIARHAL", "ROMANIA", nominal value - "10 LEI", coat of arms of Romania, year of issue "2010"	Portrait of the Patriarch, years of birth and death, coat of arms of the Romanian Patriarchy, "PATRIARHUL NAME LASTNAME"	19 July 2010	proof	1,000	Justinian Marina	Five silver coins set dedicated to the Patriarchs of All Romania
		10 lei	37 mm	31.103 g	Silver 999‰	milled	Patriarchal Palace, "PALATUL PATRIARHAL", "ROMANIA", nominal value - "10 LEI", coat of arms of Romania, year of issue "2010"	Portrait of the Patriarch, years of birth and death, coat of arms of the Romanian Patriarchy, "PATRIARHUL NAME LASTNAME"	19 July 2010	proof	1,000	Iustin Moisescu	Five silver coins set dedicated to the Patriarchs of All Romania
		10 lei	37 mm	31.103 g	Silver 999‰	milled	Patriarchal Palace, "PALATUL PATRIARHAL", "ROMANIA", nominal value - "10 LEI", coat of arms of Romania, year of issue "2010"	Portrait of the Patriarch, years of birth and death, coat of arms of the Romanian Patriarchy, "PATRIARHUL NAME LASTNAME"	19 July 2010	proof	1,000	Teoctist Arăpaşu	Five silver coins set dedicated to the Patriarchs of All Romania
		10 lei	37 mm	31.103 g	Silver 999‰	milled			30 July 2010	proof	1,000	150 years since the birth of soprano Hariclea Darclée	
		10 lei	37 mm	31.103 g	Silver 999‰	milled			6 August 2010	proof	1,000	200 years since the birth of August Treboniu Laurian	
		10 lei	37 mm	31.103 g	Silver 999‰	milled			16 August 2010	proof	1,000	100 years since the birth of actor Ştefan Ciobotăraşu	
		10 lei	37 mm	31.103 g	Silver 999‰	milled			11 October 2010	proof	1,000	100 years since the construction of the first jet engine aircraft by Henri Coandă	
		50 bani	23.75 mm	6.1 g	Copper 80%, Zinc 15%, Nickel 5%	ROMANIA * ROMANIA *	Value, coat of arms, "ROMANIA", year of minting	Aurel Vlaicu, 1910 (year of first Romanian flight), years of birth and death of Aurel Vlaicu	25 October 2010	BU		100 years since the first Romanian flight made by Aurel Vlaicu, with a self-built machine	
		50 bani	23.75 mm	6.1 g	Copper 80%, Zinc 15%, Nickel 5%	ROMANIA * ROMANIA *	Value, coat of arms, "ROMANIA", year of minting	Aurel Vlaicu, 1910 (year of first Romanian flight), years of birth and death of Aurel Vlaicu	25 October 2010	proof	5,000	100 years since the first Romanian flight made by Aurel Vlaicu, with a self-built machine	
		100 lei	21 mm	6.452 g	Gold 900‰	milled	"ROMANIA", coat of arms of Romania, "100 LEI", in a medallion the portrait of Queen Maria, "REGINA MARII UNIRI", laurel wreath	Portrait of Queen Maria wearing the 1925 coronation crown, year of birth "1875", year of issue of the coin "2010", "REGINA MARIA A ROMANIEI MARI"	15 November 2010	proof	1,000	135 years since the birth of Queen Maria	
		10 lei	37 mm	31.103 g	Silver 999‰	milled			29 November 2010	proof	1,000	Grigore Alexandrescu	
		10 lei	37 mm	31.103 g	Silver 999‰	milled			10 December 2010	proof	1,000	125 years since the birth of Liviu Rebreanu	
		10 lei	37 mm	31.103 g	Silver 999‰	milled			20 December 2010	proof	500	The old Palace of the National Bank of Romania	Palaces of Bucharest
		10 lei	37 mm	31.103 g	Silver 999‰	milled			20 December 2010	proof	500	Bucharest Palace of Justice	Palaces of Bucharest
		10 lei	37 mm	31.103 g	Silver 999‰	milled			20 December 2010	proof	500	Bucharest Chamber of Commerce and Agriculture and Bucharest Stock Exchange Palace	Palaces of Bucharest
These images are to scale at 2.5 pixels per millimetre. For table standards, see the coin specification table.

== 2011 ==
2011 commemorative coins
Images		Value	Technical parameters			Description			Date of issue	Mintage		Event/Collection	
Obverse	Reverse	Value	Diameter	Mass	Composition	Edge	Obverse	Reverse	Date of issue	Quality	Number	Event	Collection
		10 lei	37 mm	31.1040 g	Silver 925‰	milled	Effigy of Dr. lt. Victor Anastasiu founder of the Aeronautical Medical Centre, "ROMANIA", coat of arms of Romania, value	Coat of arms of the National Institute of Aeronautical and Spatial Medicine, "INSTITUTUL NATIONAL DE MEDICINA AERONAUTICA SI SPATIALA 'GL. DR. AV. VICTOR ANASTASIU'", Icar, "1920 – 2010"	17 January 2011	proof	500	90 years since the founding of the National Institute for Aeronautical and Spatial medicine "General Doctor Aviator Victor Anastasiu"	
		10 lei	13.92 mm	1.2240 g	Gold 999‰	milled	Princely Church of Curtea de Argeş, coat of arms of Romania, value, year of issue, "ROMANIA"	Image of the pafta, "PAFTAUA DE LA CURTEA DE ARGES"	7 February 2011	proof	500	Curtea de Argeş Pafta	History of gold
		10 lei	37 mm	31.103 g	Silver 999‰	milled	Strei Church, "ROMANIA", coat of arms of Romania, year of issue, value	Strei Church, "MONUMENTE DE ARTA MEDIEVALA CRESTINA". "BISERICA STREI"	28 February 2011	proof	500	Strei Church	Medieval Christian Monuments
		10 lei	37 mm	31.103 g	Silver 999‰	milled	The defence tower and church of Humor Monastery, coat of arms of Romania, "ROMANIA", value, year of issue	Church of Humor Monastery, "MONUMENTE DE ARTA MEDIEVALA CRESTINA", "MANASTIREA HUMOR"	28 February 2011	proof	500	Humor Monastery	Medieval Christian Monuments
		10 lei	37 mm	31.103 g	Silver 999‰	milled	Dionisie turret and Hurezi Monastery chapel, coat of arms of Romania, "ROMANIA", value, year of issue	The great church of Hurezi Monastery, "MONUMENTE DE ARTA MEDIEVALA CRESTINA", "MANASTIREA HUREZI"	28 February 2011	proof	500	Hurezi Monastery	Medieval Christian Monuments
		10 lei	37 mm	31.103 g	Silver 999‰	milled	Representation of the minting process, coat of arms of Romania, value, "ROMANIA"	the first builfding of the State Mint, the first minted coins, "1870", "2010", "MONETARIA STATULUI", "140 DE ANI DE LA INFIINTARE"	14 March 2011	proof	1.000	140 years since the founding of the State Mint de ani de la înfiinţarea Monetăriei Statului	
		100 lei	21 mm	6.452 g	Gold 900‰	milled	Peleş Castle, coat of arms of Romania, value, year of issue, "ROMANIA"	1881 coat of arms of Romania, effigy of King Carol I, "10 MAI 1881", signature of King Carol I, "130 ANI", "PROCLAMAREA REGATULUI ROMANIEI"	10 May 2011	proof	500	130 years since the proclamation of the Kingdom	
		10 lei	37 mm	31.103 g	Silver 999‰	milled	Periodic table, laboratory materials, microscope and molecule, "ROMANIA", value, coat of arms of Romania	Effigy of Costin Nenițescu, "COSTIN NENIȚESCU", logo of the International Year of Chemistry, "2011", symbol of the atom, formulas of two compounds discovered by Costin Nenițescu, "ANUL INTERNAȚIONAL AL CHIMIEI"	6 June 2011	proof	500	International Year of Chemistry	
		10 lei	37 mm	31.103 g	Silver 999‰	milled	Effigy of Alexandru Ioan Cuza, coat of arms of Romania, value, year of issue, "ROMANIA", "ALEXANDRU IOAN CUZA"	On a shield, the two symbols of Moldavia and Wallachia with a princerly crown as crest, "STEMA PRINCIPATELOR UNITE MOLDOVA SI TARA ROMANEASCA", "1861"	27 June 2011	proof	500	150 years since the adoption of the coat of arms of the United Principalities	
		100 lei	21 mm	6.452 g	Gold 900‰	milled	Effigy and signature of Nicolae Iorga, "140 de ani de la naștere", "1871 – 1940"	Entrance of Mihai Viteazu in Alba Iulia, the cover of a book by Nicolae Iorga, coat of arms of Romania, value, year of issue, "ROMANIA"	27 July 2011	proof	500	140 years since the birth of Nicolae Iorga	
		10 lei	37 mm	31.103 g	Silver 999‰	milled	Paintings of Nicolae Tonitza, Effigy of Alexandru Ioan Cuza, coat of arms of Romania, value, year of issue, "ROMANIA"	Effigy and signature of Nicolae Tonitza, paintings of Nicolae Tonitza, "1886 – 1940"	27 June 2011	proof	500	125 years since the birth of Nicolae Tonitza	
		50 bani	23.75 mm	6.1 g	brass	"ROMANIA*; ROMANIA*"	"50 bani", coat of arms, "ROMANIA", "2011", Cozia Monastery	Mircea cel Bătrân, 1386–1418 (years of reign)	12 September 2011	BU	5,000,000	625 years since the crowning of Mircea cel Bătrân.	
		200 lei	27 mm	15.551 g	Gold 999‰	smooth	"200 lei", coat of arms, "ROMANIA", "2011", Cozia Monastery	Mircea cel Bătrân, 1386–1418 (years of reign)	12 September 2011	proof	250	625 years since the crowning of Mircea cel Bătrân.	
		10 lei	37 mm	31.103 g	Silver 999‰	reeded			26 September 2011	proof	500	450 years since the printing of the Bible in Romanian	
		10 lei	37 mm	31.103 g	Silver 999‰	reeded			10 October 2011	proof	500	130 years since the birth of George Bacovia	
		10 lei	37 mm	31.103 g	Silver 999‰	reeded			31 October 2011	proof	500	375 years since the birth of Nicolae Milescu	
		10 lei	37 mm	31.103 g	Silver 999‰	reeded			14 November 2011	proof	500	150 years since the founding of the Sibiu ASTRA Society	
		10 lei	37 mm	31.103 g	Silver 999‰	reeded			28 November 2011	proof	500	150 years since the founding of the first Military institutions of modern Romania	
		100 lei	21 mm	6.452 g	Gold 900‰	reeded			12 December 2011	proof	500	190 years since the 1821 Revolution of Tudor Vladimirescu	
		10 lei	13.92 mm	1.224 g	Gold 999‰	reeded			22 December 2011	proof	500	The Garvăn–Dinogetia Cross	History of Gold
These images are to scale at 2.5 pixels per millimetre. For table standards, see the coin specification table.

== 2012 ==
2012 commemorative coins
Images		Value	Technical parameters			Description			Date of issue	Mintage		Event/Collection	
Obverse	Reverse	Value	Diameter	Mass	Composition	Edge	Obverse	Reverse	Date of issue	Quality	Number	Event	Collection
		10 lei	37 mm	31.103 g	Silver 999‰	milled			27 January 2012	proof	500	10 years since the introduction of Euro banknotes and Euro coins	
		10 lei	37 mm	31.103 g	Silver 999‰	milled			27 February 2012	proof	500	200 years since the birth of the photographer Carol Popp de Szathmári	
		10 lei	37 mm	31.103 g	Silver 999‰	milled			19 March 2012	proof	500	Centenary of the first modern Romanian law on passports	
		10 lei	37 mm	31.103 g	Silver 999‰	milled			23 April 2012	proof	500	150 years since the founding of the Ministry of Foreign Affairs	
		100 lei	21 mm	6.452 g	Gold 900‰	milled	Value, "ROMANIA", year of issue "2012", Curtea de Argeş monastery church in section	Portrait of Neagoe Basarab, Curtea de Argeș church, "1512", "BISERICA MANASTIRII CURTEA DE ARGES" "NEAGOE BASARAB"	25 June 2012	proof	250	500 years since the start of the reign of Wallachian domnitor Neagoe Basarab and the start of the construction of Curtea de Argeș Cathedral	
		50 bani	23.75 mm	6.100 g	Brass	"ROMANIA * ROMANIA *"	Value, "ROMANIA", year of issue "2012", Curtea de Argeş monastery church in section	Portrait of Neagoe Basarab, Curtea de Argeș church, "1512", "BISERICA MANASTIRII CURTEA DE ARGES" "NEAGOE BASARAB"	25 June 2012	BU	1,000,000	500 years since the start of the reign of Wallachian domnitor Neagoe Basarab and the start of the construction of Curtea de Argeș Cathedral	
		10 lei	37 mm	31.103 g	Silver 999‰	milled			6 July 2012	proof	500	100 years since the birth of Nicolae Steinhardt	
		10 lei	37 mm	31.103 g	Silver 999‰	milled			23 July 2012	proof	500	125 years since the birth of Elena Caragiani-Stoenescu	
		10 lei	37 mm	31.103 g	Silver 999‰	milled			10 August 2012	proof	500	90 years since the birth of Marin Preda	
		100 lei	21 mm	6.452 g	Gold 900‰	milled			10 September 2012	proof	250	200 years since the birth of George Barițiu	
		10 lei	37 mm	31.103 g	Silver 999‰	milled			29 October 2012	proof	500	100 years since birth of Cardinal Alexandru Todea	
These images are to scale at 2.5 pixels per millimetre. For table standards, see the coin specification table.

== 2013 ==
2013 commemorative coins
Images		Value	Technical parameters			Description			Date of issue	Mintage		Event/Collection	
Obverse	Reverse	Value	Diameter	Mass	Composition	Edge	Obverse	Reverse	Date of issue	Quality	Number	Event	Collection
		10 lei	37 mm	31.103 g	Silver 999‰	milled			11 February 2013	proof	500	350 years since the erection of the wooden Church of the Holy Archangels in Rogoz, Maramureş	

== 2014 ==
2014 commemorative coins
Images		Value	Technical parameters			Description			Date of issue	Mintage		Event/Collection	
Obverse	Reverse	Value	Diameter	Mass	Composition	Edge	Obverse	Reverse	Date of issue	Quality	Number	Event	Collection
		10 lei	37 mm	31.103 g	Silver 999‰	milled			10 February 2014	proof	250	100 years since the establishment of the Romanian Olympic Committee	
