= Alcibiades Diamandi =

Aromanian politician and Axis collaborator

Alcibiades Diamandi Alchibiad Diamandi Αλκιβιάδης Διαμάντης
- Born: 13 August 1893; Samarina, Manastir vilayet, Ottoman Empire (modern Greece)
- Died: 9 July 1948 (aged 54); Bucharest, Romania
- Occupation: Politician
- Military career
- Allegiance: Principality of the Pindus; Kingdom of Italy
- Branch: Roman Legion
- Service years: 1941–1942

Alcibiades Diamandi (13 August 1893 – 9 July 1948, sometimes spelled Diamanti or Diamantis; Aromanian: Alchibiad Diamandi; Greek: Αλκιβιάδης Διαμάντης) was an Aromanian political figure of Greece and Axis collaborator, active during the First and Second world wars in connection with the Italian occupation forces and Romania. By 1942, he fled to Romania and after the end of the Second World War he was sentenced by the Special Traitor's Courts in Greece to death. In Romania he was jailed by the new Communist government and died there in 1948.

== From Samarina to Bucharest ==
Alcibiades Diamandi was born in 1894, in Samarina, into a wealthy Aromanian (Vlach) family. He studied at the Greek Gymnasium in Siatista, continuing his studies in Romania where he became involved in the Aromanian separatist movement. During the course of World War I he served as a non-commissioned officer in the Greek army. In 1917, he formed an armed Aromanian separatist band that operated in the Pindus mountains, then part of an Italian protectorate over Albania. Following the occupation of part of the Pindus by Italy in 1917, he proclaimed the foundation of the Samarina Republic centered in Samarina. Following a diplomatic protest by Greece, Italian troops departed from Epirus as did Diamandi who was charged with sedition. Returning to Romania in the early 1920s he entered the Romanian diplomatic service and was appointed consul at Sarandë in order to influence the local Aromanian population. It is believed that in 1925 he became an agent of the Italian intelligence services. Diamandi's involvement in illegal economic activities led to his removal from the Romanian diplomatic corp. In 1927, Diamandi received a pardon from the Greek government.

== The Athens years ==
Shortly after the presumed amnesty, he arrived in Athens as the "vice president of the National Petroleum Company of Romania", as an oil importer. This was coupled with importing lumber from Romania to Greece and some other business ventures. He rented a flat in the fashionable Kolonaki district, and frequented the bars and cafes of Piraeus, where he was involved in a brawl with a Greek navy captain. During the squabble, Diamandi was wounded by a bottle flung in his direction by his adversary, and the resulting scar was used to identify him later on when he was on the run.

Diamandi frequently traveled to Rhodes (which was at the time an Italian possession), managing to attract the attention of the Greek Counter-intelligence Services. It is widely assumed that the Greek government was aware that Diamandi was an undercover Romanian agent who was trying to incite the Aromanians against the Greek state. During Ioannis Metaxas's regime, Diamandi was served with an expulsion order, but he managed to avoid being forced out and continued his activities.

== World War II ==
When the Greco-Italian War started, at the end of October 1940, Diamandi was already in Konitsa on the Albanian-Greek border. The invading Italians offered him the rank of Commendatore, and he served as translator and assistant to the Italian Chief of Staff General Alfredo Guzzoni. After Italy's initial defeat, Diamandi was forced to seek refuge in Tirana (at that time under Italian rule) and re-entered Greece with the Italian armies five months later in the spring of 1941.

This time he discussed a so-called "Autonomous State of the Pindus" (Αυτόνομον Κράτος της Πίνδου) or "Autonomous Vlach State" (Αυτόνομον Βλαχικόν Κράτος) in the territory of Epirus, Thessaly and parts of Macedonia, which was supposed to constitute a homeland for the Aromanians. This planned state or canton is sometimes called "Principality of Pindus" (the name used to mainly refer to the events in Pindus in August 1917). Diamandi's deputy and right-hand was the Larissa-based lawyer Nicolaos Matussis, while the third in the hierarchy of the nascent state was Vassilis Rapotikas.

In June 1941, Diamandi found himself in Grevena and then he went to Metsovo, where he founded the "Party of the Kοutso-Vlach Community" (Κόμμα Κοινότητας Κουτσοβλάχων) which was part of the "Union of Romanian Communities" (Ένωσις Ρουμανικών Κοινοτήτων). An Aromanian parliament was summoned in Trikala, but no laws were adopted—since the meeting was mostly for show; the Italians were not keen on sharing power in the region.

== An Aromanian manifesto in occupied Greece ==
On 1 March 1942 Diamandi issued an ample Manifesto which was published in the local press and republished by Stavros Anthemides in 1997 (in his book on the Vlachs of Greece; see bibliography). The Manifesto was co-signed by leading Aromanians intellectuals such as:

- the lawyer Nicolaos Matussis
- Prof. Dimas Tioutras
- the lawyer Vasilakis Georgios
- the physician Dr. Frangkos Georgios
- the teacher A. Beca
- the businessman Gachi Papas
- the physician Dr. Nikos Mitsibouna
- Prof. Dim. Hatzigogou
- the lawyer A. Kalometros
- the engineer Niko Teleionis
- Vasilis Tsiotzios
- Prof. Kosta Nicoleskou
- Prof. Toli Pasta
- Dim. Tahas
- Prof. Stefanos Kotsios
- Prof. G. Kontoinani
- Dr. Kaloera
- Prof. Toli Hatzi
- Giovani Mertzios
- Pericli Papas
- Prof. Virgiliu Balamace
- ing. S. Pelekis
- K. Pitouli
- the lawyer Toli Hatzis
- Dim. Barba

Two Aromanians of Albania and Bulgaria, Vasilis Vartolis and the Samarina-born poet Zicu Araia, also endorsed the Manifesto. In Romania, it was co-signed by the Veria-born George Murnu, a professor at the University of Bucharest. Diamandi travelled to Bucharest shortly after he met Murnu, and together they attended a meeting with the then Leader (Conducător) of Romania Marshal Ion Antonescu, and the Foreign Minister Mihai Antonescu. The status of the Principality of Pindos was discussed.

One option favoured by Diamandi was to put the Principality under the sovereignty of the Romanian Crown (as an associated "free state"). Another option was to link the principality to the ruling Italian House of Savoy. None of these options were to be realised.

== Refuge in Romania ==
Towards the second year of the Italian occupation, guerilla actions broke out in the area, between the Greek Resistance supported by the Allied Forces and the Italo-German side. The chaos that ensued drove Diamandi to leave (either that or he was ordered back) to Romania. Diamandi was arrested by the Romanian Communist Secret Service ”Securitate” on 21 February 1948. He died in the Prefecture of Police in Bucharest some months later supposedly under torture by Soviet Agent Mihail Dulgheru.

Matoussi escaped, first to Athens then to Romania too, while Rapoutikas was shot dead by one of the Greek factions involved in guerilla activities just outside Larissa (the Greeks then tied his corpse on the back a donkey and paraded him through the Aromanian villages of the Pindus – this was intended in order to scare the local populace and as a final proof that the Roman Legion had reached its end).

== Reception ==
According to the German scholar Thede Kahl, Diamandi was for a while Kingdom of Romania's Consul in the Albanian port Vlorë just opposite across the strait of the Italian town of Otranto. Greek historians often do not mention him, while other scholars who give vague reference to him (such as"Lena Divani". Archived from the original on 2007-08-18. or Mark Mazower) make sure that they clearly distance themselves from Diamandi hence bestowing upon him apelatives like "extremist" and "shameful".

Alkiviadis Diamandi is given mention in 1995 by the British author Tim Salmon in his book about the Aromanians of Greece (see bibliography) as follows:

A pro-Mussolini teacher called Dhiamantis who returned to Samarina during the Occupation and tried to set up a fascist Vlach state the Principality of Pindus. It is possible that the idea of autonomy struck a chord in some nationalistic Vlach breasts but they certainly were not the collaborators he accused them of being.

The author finds the precedents of Diamandi's movement in the Aromanians' desire of separateness, which he sees as a sign of "strength".

He writes:

Up to the 1920s the Vlakholoi - the Vlach clan as it were- had been so strong that the government could not really interfere with them. There had been Romanian schools (financed from Romania from around the Treaty of Berlin in 1881 which forced the Turks to cede Thessaly to Greece, drawing the frontier through Metsovo and thus dividing the Greek Vlachdom in Yannina, Thessaloniki and Grevena up until 1940. In fact, there was one in Samarina itself.

== Bibliography ==
- Evangelos Averof-Tositsas, Η πολιτική πλευρά του κουτσοβλαχικού ζητήματος ["The political aspects of the Aromanian question"], Trikala reprint 1992 (1st edition Athens 1948), p. 94
- Stauros A. Papagiannis, Τα παιδιά της λύκαινας. Οι "επίγονοι" της 5ης Ρωμαϊκής Λεγεώνας κατά την διάρκεια της Κατοχής 1941-1944 ["Wolf children. The "descendants" of the 5th Roman Legion during the occupation 1941-1944"], Athens, 1998
- Anthemidis, Axilleas, The Vlachs of Greece. Thessaloniki: Malliaris 1998 (Greek).
- Tim Salmon, Unwritten Places, Athens Lycabettus Press, 1995 (see p. 149 and 215)
- T. J. Winnifrith, The Vlachs: The History of a Balkan People, Palgrave Macmillan, 1987
- Kahl, Thede, Ethnizität und räumliche Verteilung der Aromunen in Südosteuropa, Münstersche geographische Arbeiten, 43, Münster 1999. ISBN 3-9803935-7-7 (see pp. 55–56 on Diamandi)
- Koliopoulos, John, Greece: The Modern Sequel, Hurst 2001
- Koukounas, Demosthenes (2013). Η Ιστορία της Κατοχής [History of the Occupation] (in Greek). Vol. II. Athens: Livani. ISBN 978-960-14-2687-7.
