= Gheorghe Constantin Roja =

Aromanian doctor, philologist and historian

- Born: 1786; Bitola, Ottoman Empire (now North Macedonia)
- Died: 12 February 1847 (aged 60–61); Oravița, Habsburg Empire (now Romania)
- Occupations: Doctor; historian; philologist
- Era: Enlightenment
- Movement: Transylvanian School
- Writing career
- Language: Romanian, Aromanian, German
- Notable work: Untersuchungen über die Romanier oder sogennanten Wlachen, welche jenseits der Donau wohnen (Studies about the Romanians or so-called Vlachs, which live beyond the Danube)

Gheorghe Constantin Roja (1786 – 12 February 1847) was an Aromanian medical doctor, a philologist, and a historian. He was a representative of the Transylvanian School and of the Age of Enlightenment in the history of the Aromanians.

== Biography ==
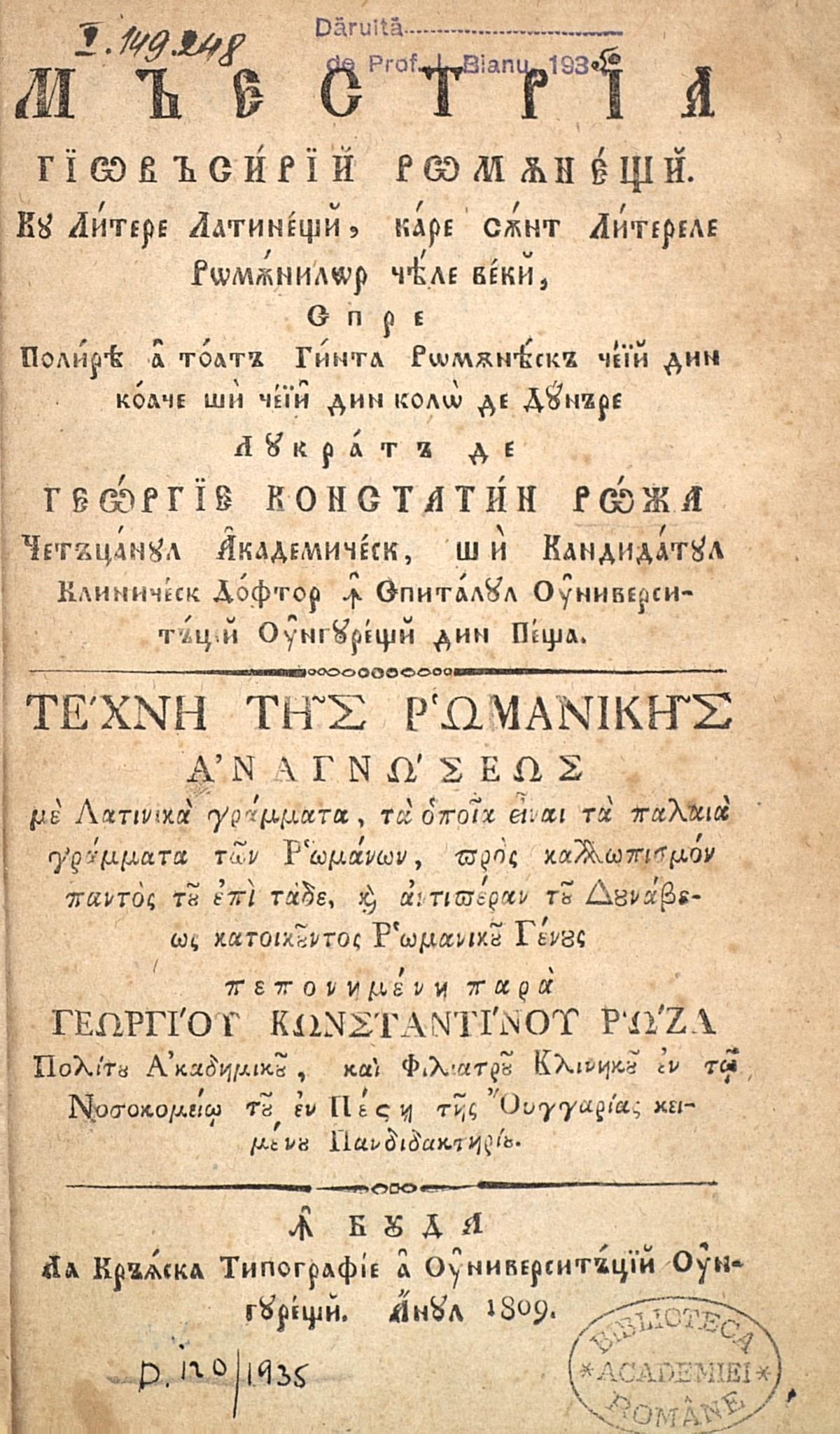
Măiestria ghiovasirii românești, front page

Roja was born in 1786 in Bitola in the Ottoman Empire (now in North Macedonia), then a town with a significant Aromanian population. At the age of eight, he moved to Timișoara with one of his uncles. He studied at the local high school and then at Semmelweis University in Pest. During his stay in Pest, he met Petru Maior, the censor of Romanian-language books printed at the University of Pest's typography, who helped him publish in 1808 his main work: Untersuchungen über die Romanier oder sogennanten Wlachen, welche jenseits der Donau wohnen (Studies about the Romanians or so-called Vlachs, which live beyond the Danube). From 1821 until his death in 1847, Roja was the district doctor in Oravița.

Roja supported the use of the Latin alphabet instead of the Greek one in Aromanian-language writings. In his 1808 Studies, he promoted the idea of a common origin between the Aromanians and the Romanians and their use of a common literary language, and rejected the use of the term Vlachs, which he deemed as only a synonym for shepherds in Slavic languages. For this purpose, he published Măestria ghiovăsirii românești in 1809, where he reiterated his ideas in both Greek and Romanian.
