= Roman Legion (1941–1943) =

World War II Aromanian separatist political and paramilitary organization in Greece

Roman Legion Ρωμαϊκή Λεγεώνα
- Leaders: Alcibiades Diamandi, Nicolaos Matussis, Vassilis Rapotikas
- Dates active: 1941–1943
- Allegiance: Axis powers
- Headquarters: Samarina, Greece
- Active regions: Macedonia, Thessaly
- Size: c.2,000
- Wars: World War II

The Roman Legion (Greek: Ρωμαϊκή Λεγεώνα, romanized: Romaïkí Legeóna), also known as the Vlach Legion (Greek: Βλάχικη Λεγεώνα, romanized: Vláchiki Legeóna) in later bibliography, was a pro-Axis political and paramilitary organization active in Greece in 1941–1942, in the regions of Thessaly and Macedonia. It was created by Alcibiades Diamandi, an Aromanian (Vlach) from Samarina (Samarina, Xamarina or San Marina) who served as an agent of Italy and Romania. The Roman Legion initially had around 2,000 members, and was supported by a small part of the local Aromanians. It consisted of the dregs of the local population, such as former criminals. It was dissolved in 1942.

== History ==
Diamandi was active in the Greek regions of Thessaly and Macedonia during World War II, supporting the Italian and German occupation forces and promoting the creation of an autonomous Aromanian (Vlach) state, envisioned as the "Principality of the Pindus", a name also used for a similar attempt in 1917, in which Diamanti had also been involved. Calling himself a leader and a representative of the Aromanians of the Balkans, Diamanti established an organization named the Roman Legion and helped the Italian forces collect weapons that Greeks had hidden after the surrender of the Greek Army. Diamanti left Greece by the summer of 1942 for Romania and Nicolaos Matussis, an Aromanian lawyer, already active as second-in-command, replaced him in the organization. Another important figure in the Roman Legion was the Aromanian Vassilis Rapotikas, who led the paramilitary units. After action from several resistance groups in 1942 and the response of the ELAS against members of the Roman Legion, and the withdrawal of Italian forces, the Legion ceased to exist in September 1943, while Matussis fled to Athens.

The fate of the leading figures and the members of the Roman Legion is the following:

- Alcibiades Diamandi left for Romania in 1942, where he was later jailed when the Allies won and the new Communist government took power. He died in jail in Romania in 1948. In Greece he had been condemned to death by the Special Collaborationist Courts (Ειδικά Δικαστήρια Δοσιλόγων) set up in 1945–1947.
- Nicolaos Matussis also left Greece for Romania, one year later in 1943. He was also jailed and was handed over to the Greek authorities in 1964. In Greece, he began to serve the sentence he had received in absentia from the Special Treason Court after the war, but asked for a re-trial and was found not guilty. (At the time, several people had been pardoned for their crimes, if they could demonstrate that they were not communists, and as he had been jailed in a communist country, he had a certain presumption of good faith.) He was released and his civil rights were completely restored by a Greek court. He lived in Larisa until his death in 1991. Until his death, Matussis denied of ever being a collaborationist or a member of the legion.
- Vassilis Rapotikas was captured by the ELAS and killed on the way to ELAS headquarters at the end of May or in the beginning of June 1943.
- The members of the Roman Legion who did not flee to Romania were tried in the Treason Courts in 1945–1947 and sentenced. Of 617 people accused, 152 were found guilty, 91 of whom did not receive a sentence since they were already imprisoned for treason in other cases. For 55 there was no outcome due to their prior death (many of them killed by the Greek resistance). Some 319 were found innocent.

There are varying accounts regarding the number of members of the legion. According to a recent estimate by Kostas Verros, 400-450 men were enlisted (200 under Rapotikas, 200 under smaller units in Thessaly, 40 under the command of Georgios Metsiobounas, who was a close associate of Diamandis, and 12 high school students who received arms from the Italians). Nevertheless, this is impossible to confirm with reliable contemporary figures. According to an estimate by Georgios Exarchos, based on an interview of Matussis, there were only 126 opportunists enlisted, mostly of Albanian descent. According to Ioannis Koliopoulos, this claim would be part of a late tendency among Greeks of Aromanian descent to minimize the appeal that Italian propaganda and an Aromanian principality caused among their people and to question the very existence of the Roman Legion. Koliopoulos states that the members numbered as many as 2,000 during the first half of 1942.

== Leaders of the Roman Legion ==
- 1941–July 1942: Alcibiades Diamandi
- July 1942–autumn 1942: Nicolaos Matussis (denied by Matussis)
