= Samarina =

Samarina Σαμαρίνα
- Municipal unit
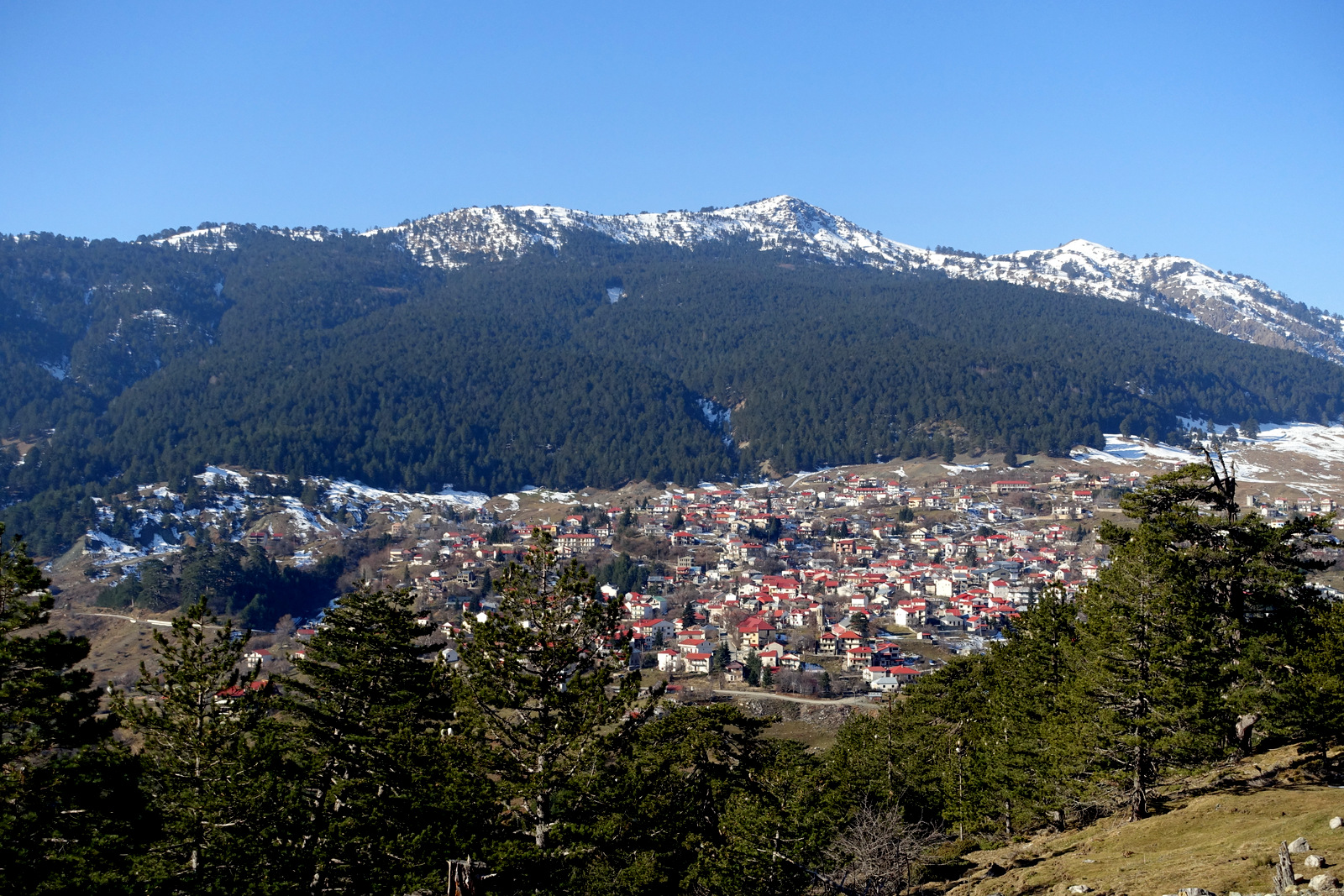
- Panoramic view

- Location within the regional unit

- Location within Greece
- Coordinates: 40°6′N 21°4′E
- Country: Greece
- Administrative region: Western Macedonia
- Regional unit: Grevena
- Municipality: Grevena

Area
  - Municipal unit: 97.245 km^{2} (37.547 sq mi)
- Elevation: 1,420 m (4,660 ft)

Population (2021)
  - Municipal unit: 253
  - Municipal unit density: 2.60/km^{2} (6.74/sq mi)
- Time zone: UTC+2 (EET)
  - Summer (DST): UTC+3 (EEST)
- Postal code: 511 00
- Area code: 24620

Samarina (Greek: Σαμαρίνα, Aromanian: Samarina, Xamarina, San Marina) is a village and a former municipality in Grevena regional unit, Western Macedonia, Greece. Since the 2011 local government reform it is part of the municipality Grevena, of which it is a municipal unit. Its population primarily consists of Aromanians (Vlachs). The population was 253 people as of 2021. It attracts many tourists due to its scenic location and beautiful pine and beech forests. The municipal unit has an area of 97.245 km^{2} (37½ sq. mi.).

== Location ==
Samarina is located on an eastern spur of Mount Smolikas, the highest of the Pindus range and the second-highest mountain in all of Greece. At an altitude of 1420 metres (4660 feet), it is considered one of the highest villages in Greece and also one of the highest in the Balkans; its height puts it among soaring settlements such as: Aetomilitsa (Densko) and Seli (Selia).

== Climate ==
Samarina has a warm-summer humid continental climate (Köppen climate classification: Dfb) using the 0 °C (32 °F) isotherm, or a temperate oceanic climate (Köppen climate classification: Cfb) using the −3 °C (27 °F) isotherm for the coldest month. Samarina experiences cold winters with high precipitation and warm, drier summers.

Climate data for Samarina
Month	Jan	Feb	Mar	Apr	May	Jun	Jul	Aug	Sep	Oct	Nov	Dec	Year
Mean daily maximum °C (°F)	0.52 (32.94)	3.03 (37.45)	7.13 (44.83)	11.08 (51.94)	16.84 (62.31)	21.14 (70.05)	25.05 (77.09)	25.10 (77.18)	21.82 (71.28)	15.16 (59.29)	7.84 (46.11)	2.81 (37.06)	13.13 (55.63)
Daily mean °C (°F)	−2.66 (27.21)	−0.97 (30.25)	2.11 (35.80)	7.01 (44.62)	12.07 (53.73)	16.37 (61.47)	19.51 (67.12)	19.43 (66.97)	14.62 (58.32)	9.22 (48.60)	3.24 (37.83)	0.24 (32.43)	8.35 (47.03)
Mean daily minimum °C (°F)	−5.30 (22.46)	−3.30 (26.06)	−1.30 (29.66)	1.99 (35.58)	4.31 (39.76)	8.29 (46.92)	10.78 (51.40)	10.52 (50.94)	6.01 (42.82)	2.12 (35.82)	−0.39 (31.30)	−3.31 (26.04)	2.53 (36.56)
Average precipitation mm (inches)	267.55 (10.53)	300.39 (11.83)	217.18 (8.55)	174.16 (6.86)	123.98 (4.88)	77.84 (3.06)	69.90 (2.75)	70.89 (2.79)	77.1 (3.04)	164.54 (6.48)	283.58 (11.16)	365.24 (14.38)	2,192.35 (86.31)
Mean monthly sunshine hours	99.19	125.85	141.21	164.69	212.79	275.24	288.62	252.93	189.78	150.20	101.84	78.98	2,081.32
Source: Hellenic National Meteorological Service

== History ==
This village in the Pindos mountains with its Aromanian population enjoyed successful periods of exceptional economic growth and cultural development. On a map it was shown under the name Santa Marina. Its inhabitants tended sheep and goats and wove a woolen fabric called flokati ('nflucati, velentza), which they sold at the region's trade fairs. The people of Samarina were also involved in trade, and as muleteers they pioneered long caravans that traveled all over the Balkans. The level of culture reached by this town (it had churches, schools and a library) is evident in the excellence of its religious painting. Samarina flourished at the end of the 18th century and during the 19th. The economic success was based on a group of activities, but mostly in the cattle-breeding, the small industries, the trade and the arts. An important account of the life of the Aromanian population of Samarina at the beginning of the 20th century is provided in a study by A.J.B. Wace and M.S. Thompson entitled Nomads of the Balkans: an account of life and customs among the Vlachs of Northern Pindus, London 1914. Samarina was also where the revolutionary Makedonomachos Arkoudas came from during the Macedonian Struggle.

The Greek folklore song "Children of Samarina" (Greek: Παιδιά της Σαμαρίνας) is associated with it. It refers to Samariniotes who fought and lost their lives during the Greek War of Independence against the Ottoman Turks. In particular, it refers to the 1826 Messolonghi events and the heroic "Exodus of its Guards". During the exit from Messolonghi, the Macedonian Guard consisting of Samariniotes, was the vanguard of the besieged, resulting in the most casualties from the Ottomans.

=== WWII ===
Dimitrios Tzimas, who was the father of the Greek Aromanian communist politician Andreas Tzimas, was from Samarina. During the Greek Resistance, Andreas Tzimas' nom de guerre as a leader of ELAS was Vasilis Samariniotis.

Samarina was also the birthplace of Alcibiades Diamandi and Nicolaos Matussis, leaders of the pro-Axis Roman Legion (1941–1943), who promoted a local autonomous Aromanian nationalist canton during World War II called in some cases the Principality of Pindus (this name is mainly used for the events of 1917 in Samarina).

== Notable people ==
- Γεώργιος Λεπιντάτος (1856-1906), known as kapetan Arkoudas, Makedonomachos
- Zicu Araia (1877–1948), Aromanian poet, schoolteacher and Axis collaborator
- Alcibiades Diamandi (1893–1948), Aromanian entrepreneur, politician and Axis collaborator
- Nicolaos Matussis (1899–1991), Aromanian lawyer, politician and Axis collaborator
- Jiří Staca (1884–1958), philologist and translator
- Dimitrios Tzimas, the father of the Greek Aromanian communist politician Andreas Tzimas was from Samarina; Tzimas' nom de guerre was Vasilis Samariniotis.
