= Macedo-Romanian Cultural Society =

Aromanian cultural organization in Romania

- Societatea de Cultură Macedo-Română
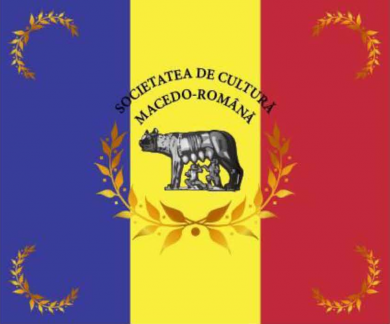

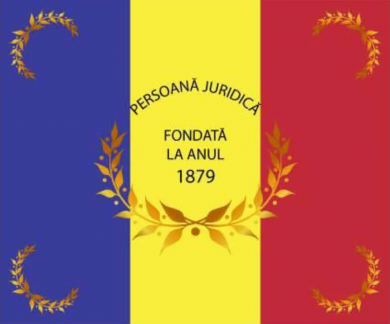
- Obverse (top) and reverse (bottom) of the flag of the Macedo-Romanian Cultural Society
- Abbreviation: SCMR
- Predecessor: Macedo-Romanian Committee (1860–1879)
- Formation: 23 September 1879; 146 years ago
- Location: Romania
- Website: Official website

The Macedo-Romanian Cultural Society (Romanian: Societatea de Cultură Macedo-Română, SCMR) is an Aromanian cultural organization in Romania. It was founded on 23 September 1879, succeeding the Macedo-Romanian Committee established in 1860. The SCMR has the aim of preserving and developing the Aromanian language and culture, and it has had a highly relevant impact on the history of the Aromanians. The society regards the Aromanians as ethnic Romanians with specific characteristics that are to be preserved.

== History and activities ==
The Macedo-Romanian Cultural Society was founded on 23 September 1879, being the oldest Aromanian cultural organization. It was recognized as a legal entity by Princely Decree No. 1289 issued by Prince of Romania Carol I on 15 April 1880. The SCMR succeeded the Macedo-Romanian Committee (Romanian: Comitetul Macedo-Român), founded in 1860 in Bucharest in the United Principalities at the initiative of Dimitrie Cozacovici, Costache and Iordache Goga, Zissu Sideri, Mihai Niculescu, Toma Tricopol, Dimitrie Bolintineanu, Christian Tell, Cezar Bolliac, C. A. Rosetti, etc., and under the patronage of Prince of Moldavia and Wallachia Alexandru Ioan Cuza.

The SCMR aims to preserve and cultivate the Aromanian language, culture, specific traditions and identity, including among the young generation. It promotes contacts and cultural ties with Aromanian communities everywhere and with the other peoples together with whom the Aromanians live. A nonprofit organization, the organization receives material and moral support from the Romanian state, having been legally recognized in the country as an association of public utility on 7 May 2008. The SCMR supports the traditional notion in Romania that the Aromanians are ethnic Romanians with some distinct particularities that should be preserved. It has the power to issue documents certifying civil status, including nationality certificates to help Aromanians obtain Romanian citizenship with considerably less bureaucratic effort.

The SCMR, together with the Romanian state itself, funded and supported the schools and publications for the Aromanians from which many renowned writers and creators of Aromanian literature emerged. It also supported churches for the Aromanians and printed and distributed manuals and worship books in both Aromanian and Romanian for free to support these institutions. The society published Albumul macedo-român ("The Macedo-Romanian Album"), founded in 1880 by the Romanian historian, academic and politician V. A. Urechia. It also published the weekly Revista Macedoniei ("Macedonia's Magazine"), which later merged with Românul de la Pind.

The society played an important role in the emission of the irâde-i seniyye ("spoken will") on 22 May 1905 by the Ottoman Sultan Abdul Hamid II that recognized the Ullah millet and thus gave the Aromanians the status of a separate ethnolinguistic group within the Ottoman Empire with its own specific rights. It also initiated the Meglenia Cultural Society for the Megleno-Romanians, which had similar objectives to the SCMR. The SCMR continued to function uninterruptedly until 1950, without being formally disbanded. It was reactivated in 1990, following the Romanian revolution in December 1989 after which several other cultural organizations of the Aromanians in Romania were also established. In 2019, the National Bank of Romania issued a commemorative coin for the 140th anniversary of the SCMR's founding.

Notable members of the SCMR's board of directors have included Vasile Alecsandri, Dimitrie Brătianu, Ioan D. Caragiani, Ion I. Câmpineanu, Dimitrie Ghica, Ion Ghica, Titu Maiorescu, Iacob Negruzzi and the aforementioned Rosetti, Tell and Urechia. Also relevant for the society's founding were Mihail Kogălniceanu and Calinic Miclescu. As of 2020, the president of the society was the Romanian Aromanian actor, director and politician Ion Caramitru.

== See also ==
- List of Aromanian cultural organizations
