= Monetăria Statului =

State Mint
- Romanian: Monetăria Statului

Autonomous Institution overview
- Formed: February 24, 1870; December 20, 1935
- Type: Autonomous Institution
- Jurisdiction: Romania
- Headquarters: București, Romania
- Autonomous Institution executive: Octavian Schen, General Director
- Parent Autonomous Institution: National Bank of Romania
- Website: www.monetariastatului.ro

The State Mint (Romanian: Monetăria Statului) is the national mint of Romania. It has its headquarters in Bucharest and produces (mints) the coins in circulation in Romania, commemorative medals, and the civil and military orders (state decorations).

== History ==
It was founded in 1870, three years after establishing the national monetary system of the leu, and since 1935 its headquarters are situated on the Filaret Hill (in Bucharest and named after a late 18th-century metropolitan of the region).

Since 1956, the State Mint is subordinated to the National Bank of Romania, and in 1990 it was reorganised as an Autonomous Institution (Regie Autonomă).

== Functioning and Governing Structures ==
Although it is a state-owned company, the State Mint is financially independent and is not subsidized by the Romanian Government.

Monetăria Statului is headed by an Administrative Council, consisting of nine members, whose president is the General Director of the institution.

== Products ==
Along with the national currency, the State Mint produces commemorative coins, medals, decorations, objects made of gold and silver, as well as numerous objects that can be made with the Mint's technology: tokens, badges, seals, engraved objects, etc.

In the last years, a significant part of the production (such as coins, medals, tokens or keychains) was sold to foreign customers from Great Britain, Germany, Netherlands, Israel, Sweden, Moldova, and Hong-Kong.

The quality system of the State Mint was reconfirmed in 2002 by the Comisia de Supraveghere, Acreditare şi Certificare a Ministerului Român de Interne, conform with the international standard SR EN ISO 9002.
