= Dacian Wars =

Dacian War(s) may refer to:

- Domitian's Dacian War, two punitive expeditions mounted as a border defense against raids of Moesia from Dacia in 86–87 AD ordered by the Emperor Titus Flavius Domitianus against Dacia and the Dacian king Decebalus
- Trajan's Dacian Wars, two campaigns of conquest ordered or led by the Emperor Trajan in 101–102 AD and 105–106 AD from Moesia against Dacia and Decebalus
