= Aromanian studies =

Academic field centered on the study of the Aromanians

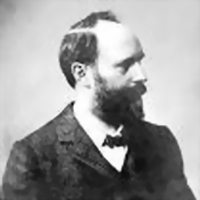
Gustav Weigand, author of several early research works on the Aromanians

Aromanian studies (Aromanian: Studii armãneshti) are an academic discipline centered on the study of the Aromanians. They are included within Balkan and Romance studies. Notable scholars on Aromanian topics include Matilda Caragiu Marioțeanu, Thede Kahl and Gustav Weigand. The Aromanian question, a term used for the historical and current division on ethnic identity among the Aromanians, has prominently influenced Aromanian studies.

== Description ==
Aromanian studies are a subset of Balkan studies. The beginning of the 21st century has seen an increase of interest in Balkanology on the small autochthonous minorities of the Balkans, including the Aromanians. The Aromanians are also researched within Romance studies.

Nationalisms and the Aromanian question have proven to be difficult obstacles for the progress of Aromanian studies, as issues such as whether the Aromanians are an independent separate ethnic group or a subgroup of the Greeks or the Romanians remain controversial.

== Institutions, journals and works ==
In 1995, with help from the University of Freiburg, the Aromanian professor Vasile Barba founded the European Center of Aromanian Studies (Aromanian: Tsentrul European ti Studii Armãneshti; German: Europäisches Zentrum für Aromunische Studien) at Freiburg im Breisgau, Germany. The Aromanian journal Zborlu a nostru ("Our Word") was edited by the European Center of Aromanian Studies.

Rivista di litiraturã shi studii armãni ("Journal of Aromanian Literature and Studies") is an academic journal on the Aromanians founded on 1 April 1994, by the Aromanian writer Tiberius Cunia. It was published semiannually by the Editura Cartea Aromână ("Aromanian Book Publishing House", in the United States) and the Fundația Cartea Aromână ("Aromanian Book Foundation", in Romania) until April 2007, having a total of 33 volumes. It was exclusively written in Aromanian, in a special alphabet aimed at becoming the standard script for the Aromanian language. The journal promoted Aromanian works, specially unpublished ones; covered Aromanian literature, be it classical or recent; included cultural and philological studies on the Aromanians; and contained ethnographical and historical information about the ethnic group.

Academic and research works in Aromanian are rare in Greece. An exception is Gogu Padioti's Căntiți Fărșerotești ("Farsherot Songs"), published in 1991 by the Society of Aromanian Culture of Athens. Written in the Latin alphabet rather than the Greek one, it is an anthology of songs of the Aromanian ethnic subgroup of the Farsherots.

== Notable people ==
In 2013, the Czech ethnologist and professor Leoš Šatava referred to Gustav Weigand, a German linguist, as the "founding father of Aromanian studies". Other researchers that have provided works relevant to Aromanian studies include the Aromanian linguist Matilda Caragiu Marioțeanu, the German ethnographer and ethnolinguist Thede Kahl, the Aromanian historian and philologist Nicolae Șerban Tanașoca and the Romanian researcher Emil Țîrcomnicu.
