= Samarina Republic =

Aromanian self-declared polity in Greece in 1917

- 29 August – 7 September 1917
- Capital: Samarina
- Common languages: Aromanian, Greek, Italian
- Government: Self-proclaimed republic
- Historical era: World War I
  - Declaration of independence: 29 August 1917
  - Withdrawal of Italian forces and re-establishment of Greek administration: 3–7 September 1917

Samarina Republic (Romanian: Republica de la Samarina) or Republic of the Pindus (Greek: Δημοκρατία της Πίνδου; Romanian: Republica Pindului) is a historiographic name for the attempt and proposal to create an Aromanian canton under the protection of Italy during World War I. A declaration of independence was issued on 29 August 1917 by some Aromanian figures at Samarina and other villages of the Pindus mountains of northern Greece during the short period of occupation by Italy of the area in July and August 1917. In the immediate withdrawal of Italians a few days later, Greek troops retook control of the region claimed by the canton without meeting any resistance.

== Background ==
Since Romania's formation in 1859, it tried to win influence over the Aromanian (and also the Megleno-Romanian) population of the Ottoman Empire. In the 1860s, it funded the activity of Apostolos Margaritis who founded Romanian schools in the Ottoman territories of Epirus and Macedonia since the Aromanian language has much in common with the Romanian language. Romania, with the support of Austria-Hungary, succeeded in the acceptance of the Aromanians as a separate millet with the decree (irade) of 22 May 1905 by Sultan Abdulhamid, so the Ullah millet ("Vlach millet", for the Aromanians) could have their own churches and schools. This was a diplomatic success of Romania in European Turkey in the last part of the 19th century.

Romania then funded the construction and operation of many schools in the wider region of Macedonia and Epirus. These schools have continued their operation even when some of the territories of the region of Macedonia and Thrace passed to Greek authority in 1912. Their financing by Romania continued in 1913 with the agreement of the then Prime Minister Eleftherios Venizelos. In such Romanian schools, there was a coordinated effort to promote the idea of Romanian identity among Aromanians. Graduates of these schools who wanted to continue their education usually went to educational institutions in Romania.

Posteriorly, during the First World War, in 1916, Albania, including Northern Epirus, was split between the Kingdom of Italy which occupied Gjirokastra and France which occupied Korçë (Curceaua, Curceauã, Curceau or Curciau), while in northern and central Albania were occupied by troops of Austria-Hungary.

On 10 December 1916, the French founded the Autonomous Albanian Republic of Korçë. In response, Austria-Hungary went on proclamation of independence of Albania as a protectorate on 3 January 1917, in Shkodra, while on 23 June 1917, the Italians proclaimed a protectorate over Albania in Gjirokastra. Then the Italian forces advanced and they captured Ioannina (Ianina or Enine).

In this environment of occupation and fragmentation of territories in Southern Albania and Northwestern Greece, Italian troops occupied Samarina (Samarina, Xamarina or San Marina) and other villages of the Pindus for a few days at the end of August 1917 to the first two days of September 1917.

== History ==
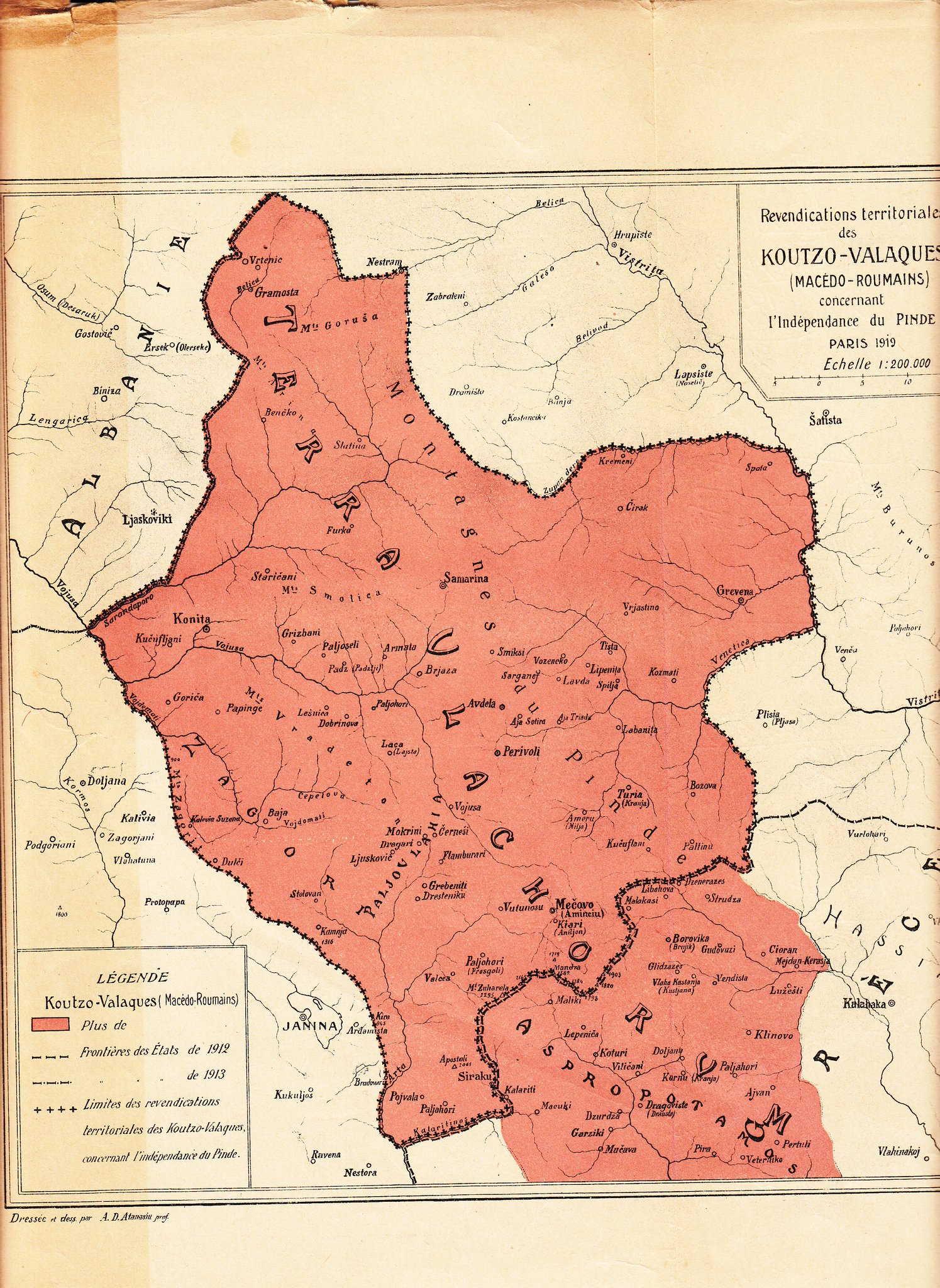
"Terra Vlachorum", the 1919 request for an Aromanian state at the Paris Peace Conference

In 1917, during the occupation of the territories of Albania and Northern Epirus, the Italians tried to win over the Aromanians to convert Aromanian-Romanian relations in favour of Italy, based on historical and linguistic relations and to change the pro-Romanian Aromanians into pro-Italian Aromanians.

In the brief period of Italian occupation of southern Albania, when Italian forces also entered Greek territory in 1917, Aromanians from several villages of the Pindus mountain requested autonomy under the protection of Italy, turning to Romania for help. Letters were sent to several countries, from mayors and representatives of 13 villages." A proclamation was sent on 29 August 1917, from Samarina signed by seven representatives, who had the role of a temporary committee and requested assistance and protection from the Italian Consulate of Ioannina. One of the members of the provisionary committee, Alcibiades Diamandi, went to Ioannina to get an answer. There was an immediate response the next day from the Romanian and the Italian consulates: A clear answer that these actions were wrong and inappropriate, were not approved by anyone, and could not be supported by any party.

One day later, the Italian army departed from Greek territory. From 3 to 7 September the Greek forces entered all the villages unopposed and, on 7 September, they arrested seven men in Samarina, giving an end to the events.

These events are described in later bibliography as an attempt to form a "Principality of the Pindus", while in other sources, no name is assigned to the events of 1917.

Later, in the Paris Peace Conference of 1919 and 1920, an Aromanian delegation requested autonomy for the Aromanians.

=== Villages and people involved ===
A letter to the Prime Minister of Romania Ion C. Brătianu, sent on 27 July 1917, was signed by mayors and notables of the following villages: Samarina, Avdella (Avdhela), Perivoli (Pirivoli), Vovousa (Bãiasa, Baiesa or Baiasa), Metsovo (Aminciu), Konitsa (Conitsa), Pades (Padzes), Kranea (Turia), Distrato (Briaza), Laista (Laca), Iliochori (Dovrinovo), Armata (Armata) and Smixi (Zmixi).

Furthermore, the assistance request to the Italian Consulate was signed by the seven members of the Provisional Committee:

- Doctor Dimitrie Diamandi
- Ianaculi Dabura
- Mihali Teguiani
- Tachi Nibi
- Zicu Araia, declared as "minister of the schools in the 'Republic of the Pindus'" and as "minister of culture" of the republic
- Alcibiades Diamandi
- Sterie Caragiani

The persons arrested by the Greek authorities in Samarina on 8 September 1917, were:

- Zicu Araia, head teacher of the Romanian school of Samarina
- Guli Papagheorghe, teacher of the Romanian school of Samarina
- Ianache Dabura, former mayor of Samarina
- Gherassim Zica, inhabitant of Samarina
- Ianachi Zuchi, inhabitant of Samarina
- Costachi Surbi, inhabitant of Samarina

== Aftermath ==
In the autumn of 1918, a group of Aromanians from the Pindus declared the "Republic of the Pindus" in Korçë, which lasted for one day. This group even resisted through military means the Greek military detachment that had originally gone to the village of Vovousa to take it over from the withdrawing Italians.

A renewed attempt at the creation of an independent state in the Pindus would take place during World War II with the Principality of the Pindus.

== See also ==
- Principality of the Pindus
