= Nicolaos Matussis =

Aromanian lawyer, politician, and Axis collaborator

Nicolaos Matussis Νικόλαος Ματούσης
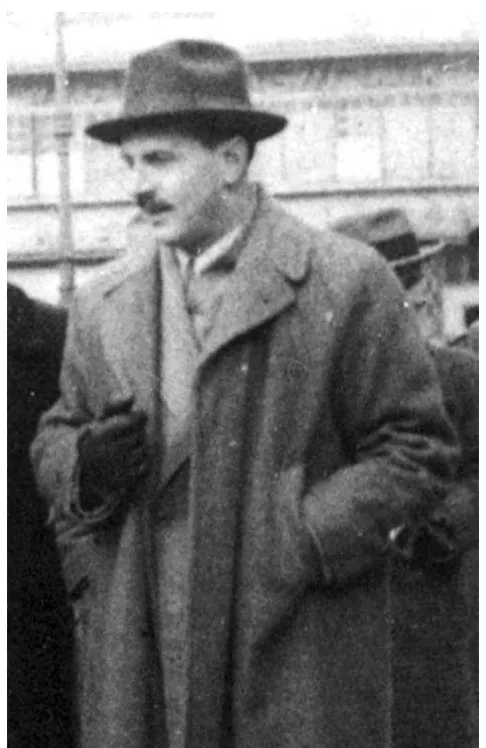
- Born: 1899; Samarina, Ottoman Empire (modern Greece)
- Died: 1991 (aged 91–92); Larissa, Greece
- Occupation: Lawyer
- Military career
- Allegiance: Principality of the Pindus; Kingdom of Italy
- Branch: Roman Legion
- Service years: 1941–1943

Nicolaos Matussis, also spelled as Nicolae Matussi (Greek: Νικόλαος Ματούσης; 1899–1991), was an Aromanian lawyer, politician and leader of the Roman Legion, a collaborationist, separatist Aromanian paramilitary unit active during World War II in central Greece.

== Early life ==
Nicolaos Matussis was born in the village of Samarina in 1899, into an Aromanian family. After graduating from the Gymnasium in Trikala, he studied law at the National and Kapodistrian University of Athens. He then went on to work as a lawyer in Larissa. He was a devoted Aromanian nationalist and became an early member of the Communist Party of Greece, even becoming a member of its central committee before being expelled from it in 1926. He then returned to Larissa where he was active in Ioannis Sofianopoulos's Agrarian Party.

== World War II ==
With the beginning of the Axis occupation of Greece, Matussis reestablished his links with Alcibiades Diamandi whom he had first met in 1920. Together they founded the Aromanian separatist state of the Principality of the Pindus, spanning from Thessaly to Epirus and Macedonia, and encompassing all Aromanian-populated areas within Greece. Matussis, Demosthenes Tsoutras and Konstantinos Tahas confounded the Italian-sponsored Roman Legion which became the state's official military force. In 1942, after Diamandi suddenly left Greece to go to Romania, Matussi became leader of the so-called Roman Legion. Then, when the Legion collapsed since their Italian supporters left and were replaced by the Germans and the Greek resistance grew more active, he went to Athens, where his attempt to court the German occupational authorities failed and he was denied a cabinet seat in the government of the Hellenic State. Having abandoned his ambitions of an Aromanian state, he founded a pro-German collaborationist organization Organization of Pioneers of New Europe (OPNE). In late 1943 or early 1944, he followed Diamandi's footsteps, fleeing to Romania.

Following King Michael's Coup, the Romanian Communist Party seized power in the country, sentencing Matussis to 20 years in prison on a Danube island. In 1964, following his requests and also the request of the Greek government, he was released to the hands of Greek authorities, who put him to prison and took him to court, accused of treason (like several members of the Roman Legion in the courts just after the war in 1945–1947). In this court (which took place in Athens, far from Larissa where he was active) and with the support of defense witnesses he was declared innocent of war crimes. In 1976 his civil rights were completely restored by a Greek court. He subsequently lived in Athens, Loutraki and from 1966 in Larissa where he died in 1991.

== Family ==
In 1920, he married Sofia Balodimou (unknown – 1984). Together, they had a daughter called Xeni (1927 – 28 September 1985), who would become a painter.
