= Thede Kahl =

German ethnographer and ethnolinguist

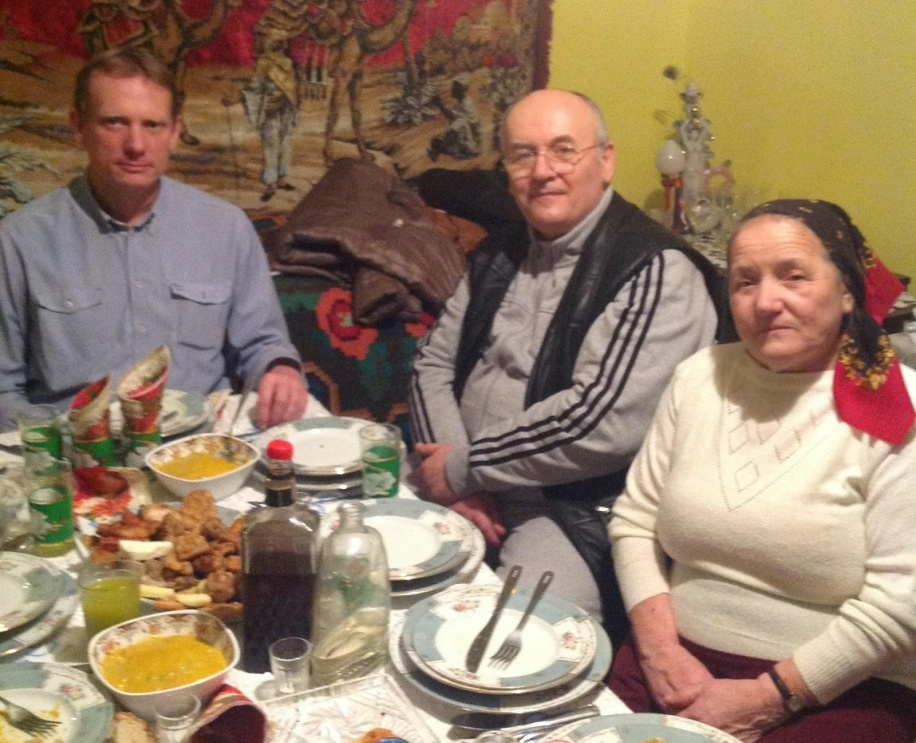
- Thede Kahl (left) together with the Romanians Viorel Rogoz (center, another ethnographer) and Victoria Lelea (right, a former worker at the Satu Mare railway station) at Marna Nouă, Romania
- Born: 30 March 1971; Hamburg, West Germany

Academic work
- Discipline: Mostly ethnography and ethnolinguistics
- Institutions: University of Jena

Thede Kahl (born 30 March 1971 in Hamburg) is a German ethnographer and ethnolinguist. He is the head of the Institute of South Slavic Studies in the University of Jena (in which he is a professor), in Germany. His research focuses are the Slavs, endangered languages and dialects, minorities of the Balkans and Anatolia and other topics related to ethnography and ethnolinguistics. Kahl has received numerous awards, such as the "Distincția Culturală" diploma from the Romanian Academy. He is also a member of various organizations like the Austrian Academy of Sciences and editor and co-editor of the journal Symbolae Slavicae. Kahl is considered an expert on Aromanian studies.
