= Principality of the Pindus =

Aromanian self-declared polity in Greece from 1941 to 1943

Principality of the Pindus Printsipat di la Pind
- 1941–1942
- Common languages: Aromanian, Greek, Italian
- Government: Self-declared semi-autonomous principality under the control of Fascist Italy (unrecognized)
  - 1941–1942: Alcibiades Diamandi
  - 1942: Nicolaos Matussis
- Historical era: World War II
Preceded by	Succeeded by
Kingdom of Greece	Kingdom of Greece

The Principality of the Pindus (Aromanian: Printsipat di la Pind; Greek: Πριγκιπάτο της Πίνδου; Italian: Principato del Pindo; Romanian: Principatul de Pind) is a name given to describe a self-declared autonomous Aromanian political entity in the territory of Greece during World War II.

In 1941, the territory of Greece was occupied by Italy, Germany and Bulgaria during World War II. At that time, Alcibiades Diamandi, an Aromanian residing in Samarina who had earlier been the leader of a previous attempt to create an Aromanian political entity, was active with an organization that later literature named the Roman Legion.

As part of the activity of the organization in the areas of mainly Thessaly (and Epirus, and West Macedonia), it was mentioned as an intention of Diamandi to create a semi-independent entity by the name "Principality of the Pindus" or "Pindus Canton" with himself as the "Prince". The Roman Legion was never able to assert itself over the Aromanians whom it supposedly represented; it received small support from the local population. The existence of the self-declared principality was also opposed by both Fascist Italy and Nazi Germany, as well as by the Greek collaborationist government and by fascist-ruled Romania.

== Background ==
Since Romania's formation in 1859, it tried to win influence over the Aromanian (and also the Megleno-Romanian) population of the Ottoman Empire. In the 1860s, it funded the activity of Apostolos Margaritis who founded Romanian schools in the Ottoman territories of Epirus and Macedonia since the Aromanian language has much in common with the Romanian language. Romania, with the support of Austria-Hungary, succeeded in the acceptance of the Aromanians as a separate millet with the decree (irade) of 23 May 1905 by Sultan Abdulhamid, so the Ullah millet ("Vlach millet", for the Aromanians) could have their own churches and schools. This was a diplomatic success of Romania in European Turkey in the last part of the 19th century.

Romania then funded the construction and operation of many schools in the wider region of Macedonia and Epirus. These schools have continued their operation even when some of the territories of the region of Macedonia and Thrace passed to Greek authority in 1912. Their financing by Romania continued in 1913 with the agreement of the then Prime Minister Eleftherios Venizelos. In such Romanian schools, there was a coordinated effort to promote the idea of Romanian identity among Aromanians. Graduates of these schools who wanted to continue their education usually went to educational institutions in Romania.

In 1917, a short-lived polity, which has been described as the "Samarina Republic" posteriorly, was declared during World War I, though it would be disestablished on the same year. In some sources, this entity is also called "Principality of the Pindus".

== History ==
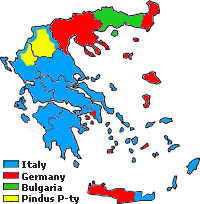
Map of Axis-occupied Greece with the polity of the Principality of the Pindus highlighted in yellow

The Aromanians were part of the projects for the dismemberment of Greece set up by the Italians. When the 11th Army occupied the areas in 1941, their commanders received orders by Palazzo Chigi (the seat of the Italian Ministry of Foreign Affairs at the time) to survey each village recording their ethnicity and its attitude towards the occupiers, finding that most Aromanians absorbed and assimilated into the Greek community with the exception of some groups who were recorded as anti-Bulgarian, anti-Greek, pro-Italian and pro-Romanian. A pre-war dossier for the Italian government on the subject of the Aromanians promoted the idea that they were descendants from the Ancient Romans and that the Aromanians had taken shelter in the Pindus Mountains against barbarian invasions, to be used at the appropriate moment.

After the fall of Greece to the Germans in spring 1941 and the division of the country among the Axis powers, Alcibiades Diamandi created a collaborationist organisation known as the Roman Legion with the support of the Italian occupation authorities and promoted the idea of an Aromanian canton or semi-independent state, called several decades later by the name "Principality of Pindus" that would encompass northwestern Greece. Diamandi also met the Greek collaborationist Prime Minister, Georgios Tsolakoglou, but Tsolakoglou refused to accommodate his demands. In reality Italian "military authorities refused to permit any form of self-administration by the Aromanians in the awareness that their irredentist aspirations, or appeals for annexation to Italy, were a masquerade by a minority movement seeking political and economic revenge". In addition, Nazi Germany also explicitly refused to approve of the creation of such an entity. The fascist government of Romania under Ion Antonescu also rejected Diamandi's plans for the principality.

From mid-1942 on, the armed Greek Resistance made its presence felt, fighting against the Italians and their collaborators and the leader of the Roman Legion, Diamandi, left for Romania in July 1942, to be allegedly followed by his second in command and successor Nicolaos Matussis. Matussis abandoned the separatist movement shortly after Diamandi and followed him to Romania. However, Matussis maintained up until his death that the charge of collaboration against him was fabricated and that he was not associated with the Roman Legion.

== See also ==
- Samarina Republic

== Sources ==
- Arseniou Lazaros, Η Θεσσαλία στην Αντίσταση
- Andreanu, José, Los secretos del Balkan
- Iatropoulos, Dimitri, Balkan Heraldry
- Toso, Fiorenzo, Frammenti d'Europa
- Zambounis, Michael, Kings and Princes of Greece, Athens 2001
- Papakonstantinou Michael, Το Χρονικό της μεγάλης νύχτας (The chronicle of big night)
- Divani, Lena, Το θνησιγενές πριγκιπάτο της Πίνδου. Γιατί δεν ανταποκρίθηκαν οι Κουτσόβλαχοι της Ελλάδας, στην Ιταλο-ρουμανική προπαγάνδα.
- Thornberry, Patrick and Miranda Bruce-Mitford, World Directory of Minorities. St. James Press 1990, page 131.
- Koliopoulos, Giannēs S. (a.k.a. John S. Koliopoulos), Plundered Loyalties: Axis Occupation and Civil Strife in Greek West Macedonia. C. Hurst & Co, 1990. page 86 ff.
- Poulto, Hugh, Who Are the Macedonians? C. Hurst & Co, 1995. page 111. (partly available online: )
- After the War Was Over: Reconstructing the Family, Nation, and State in Greece By Mark Mazower (partly available online: )
- Kalimniou, Dean, Alkiviadis Diamandi di Samarina (in Neos Kosmos English edition, Melbourne, 2006)
- Seidl-Bonitz-Hochegger, Zeitschrift für Niederösterreichischen Gymnasien XIV.
