= Aromanians in North Macedonia =

Aromanian minority within North Macedonia

Aromanians in North Macedonia Armãnji tu Machedonia di Nord Македонски Власи
Total population
- 8,714 (2021 census)

Regions with significant populations
- Kruševo, Štip, Bitola, Sveti Nikole

Languages
- Aromanian (native), Macedonian

Religion
- Predominantly Eastern Orthodoxy

Related ethnic groups
- Aromanians

The Aromanians in North Macedonia (Aromanian: Armãnji; Macedonian: Аромани, romanized: Aromani), also known as the Vlachs (Aromanian: Vlãhi; Macedonian: Власи, romanized: Vlasi), are an officially recognised minority group of North Macedonia numbering some 8,714 people according to the 2021 census. They are concentrated in Kruševo, Štip, Bitola and Skopje.

== Ethnonyms ==
The Aromanians are known as Vlachs in North Macedonia. To refer to themselves, the Aromanians may use Armčnji, Armānji, Aromani or Arominu, meaning "Roman".

The Aromanians are also identified under various names in different languages, often the word for shepherd, such as Ulah in Turkish, Çoban in Albanian, Tschobani or Vlachoi in Greek, Cincar or Vlasi in Serbian, and Koustovlahs. They are also known as Macedo-Romanians by the Romanians, or simply Macedonian Vlachs or just Vlachs in English.

== History ==
The Aromanians are a unique ethno-linguistic group with their own culture and language, who have existed for over two thousand years in the Balkan peninsula. They were, for centuries, considered a traditional mountain people and the word Vlach became synonymous with animal husbandry and herdsmanship throughout the Balkans. Although traditionally livestock herders, many began to emigrate to larger cities in the 16th and 17th centuries. Many Aromanians who fled from Moscopole and the nearby mountainous Gramos region also helped develop Kruševo (Crushuva) and Bitola (Bituli, Bitule) into large, prosperous cities. Shepherds of the Pelister region near Bitola used to herd huge flocks of sheep from the summer pastures on Pelister to the winter lowlands near Ghevgelia, Giannitsa and Salonica (Sãruna). Typical Aromanian goods were cheese, meat, wool and wool garments, leather, rugs and carpets. Many Aromanians also entered the rug and carpet trade by selling kilimi and flocati. A part of Aromanians adhered to the Bogomil faith around the 10th and 11th centuries and contributed to the spread of Bogomilism in Herzegovina. Wealthier Aromanians established themselves in Bitola and Štip (Shtip) as innkeepers, artisans, caravan traders and merchants. An Aromanian market (Macedonian: Vlaška čaršija) was established in Bitola's Aromanian quarter. The Aromanian element is still present in Bitola to this day.

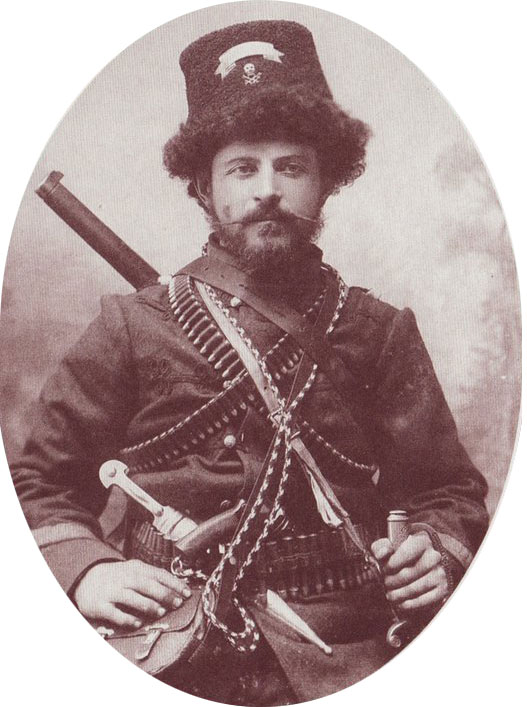
Pitu Guli, IMRO activist and hero of the Krushevo Republic

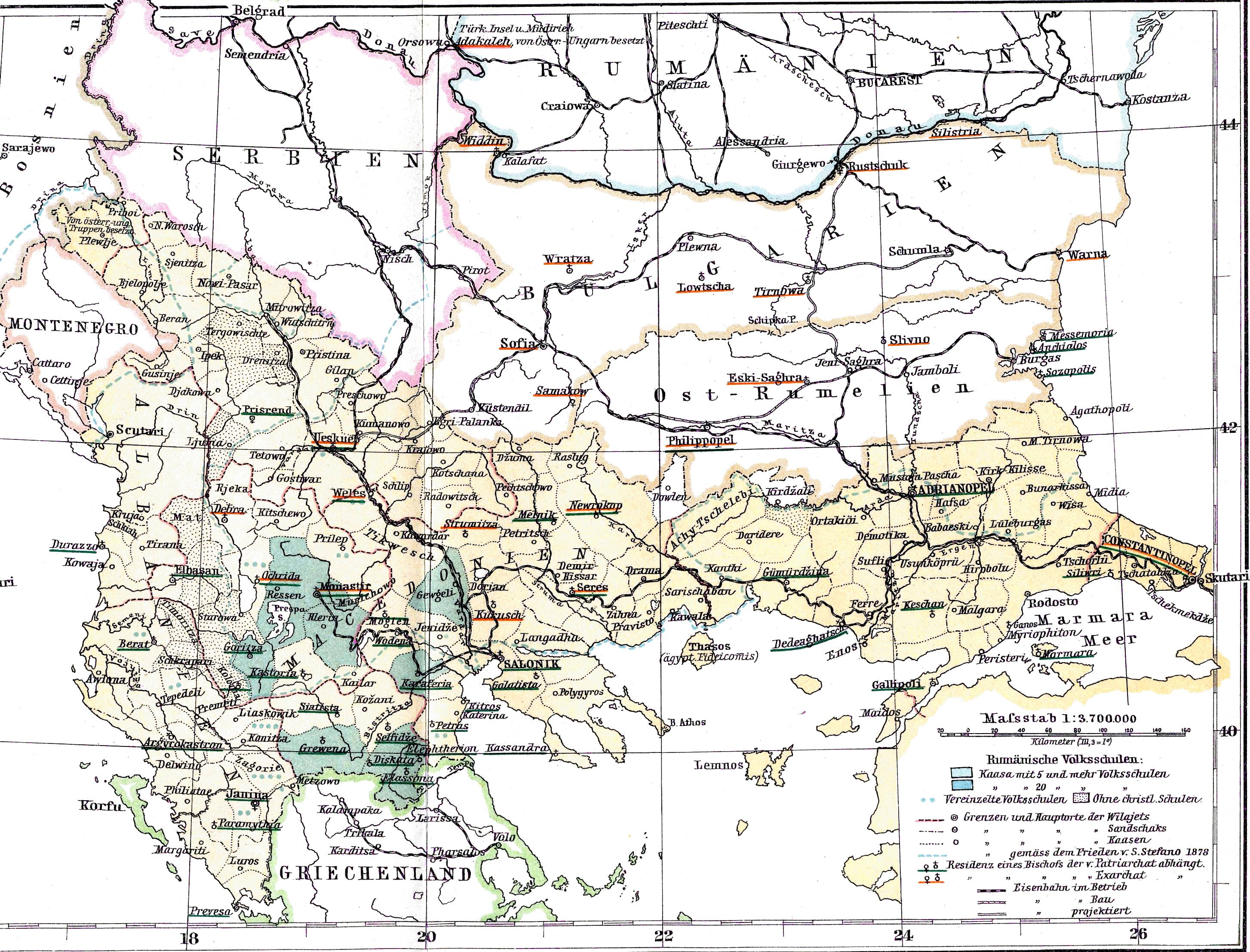
Map showing areas with Romanian schools for Aromanians and Megleno-Romanians in the Ottoman Empire (1886)

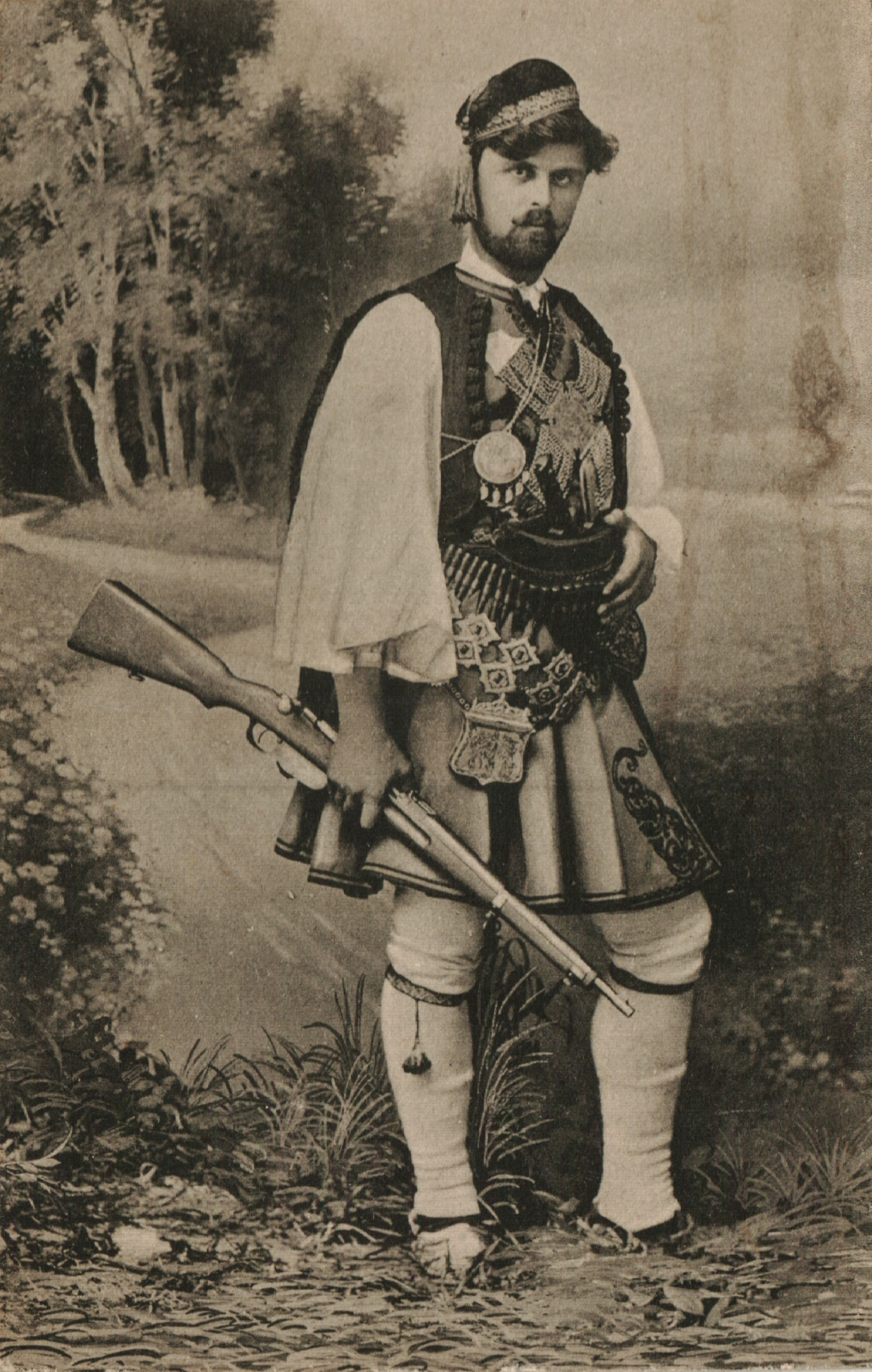
Ioryi Mucitano, the first leader of the first Aromanian band in the IMRO.

The Aromanian mountain villages of Magarevo (Magaruva, Mãgãreva), Gopeš (Gopish, Gopeshi), and Trnovo (Aromanian: Tãrnuva/Tãrnova) were founded on the foot hills of Mount Pelister. Other settlements with significant Aromanian population in the second half of 19th century were: Nižepole, Malovište, Resen, Jankovec, Ohrid, Struga, Dolna Belica, Gorna Belica, Drenok, Modrič, Vevčani, Višni, Podgorci, Labuništa, Prilep, Gradešnica, Bešište, Budimirci, Kičevo, Veles, and Bogomila, and in fewer numbers in the regions of Skopje, Kočani, Kumanovo, and Gostivar. By the 1860s, many Aromanians had joined the agitation present in Macedonia and supported the Macedonian Revolutionary movement. Many Aromanians had also identified with Romanians or Greeks, some with Bulgarians. The first Romanian school was established in 1864 in the village of Trnovo by the Aromanian Dimitri Atanasescu and was followed by another 40 Romanian language Aromanian schools. Many of these schools provided an education in both the Romanian and Aromanian languages. In the late 19th century a split between the Grecophile and Romanophile Aromanians occurred. This struggle became violent with schools burnt down, cemeteries desecrated and people assaulted. The Aromanian people participated in the Ilinden Uprising and the establishment of the Kruševo Republic. The Kruševo Republic is hailed by Aromanians as the Ten Days of Freedom. The Prime Minister of the Republic was Dinu Vangel, with other Aromanians occupying high administrative positions too. Another notable Aromanian who participated was the heroic Pitu Guli who was killed on the Mečkin Kamen (Bear's Rock).

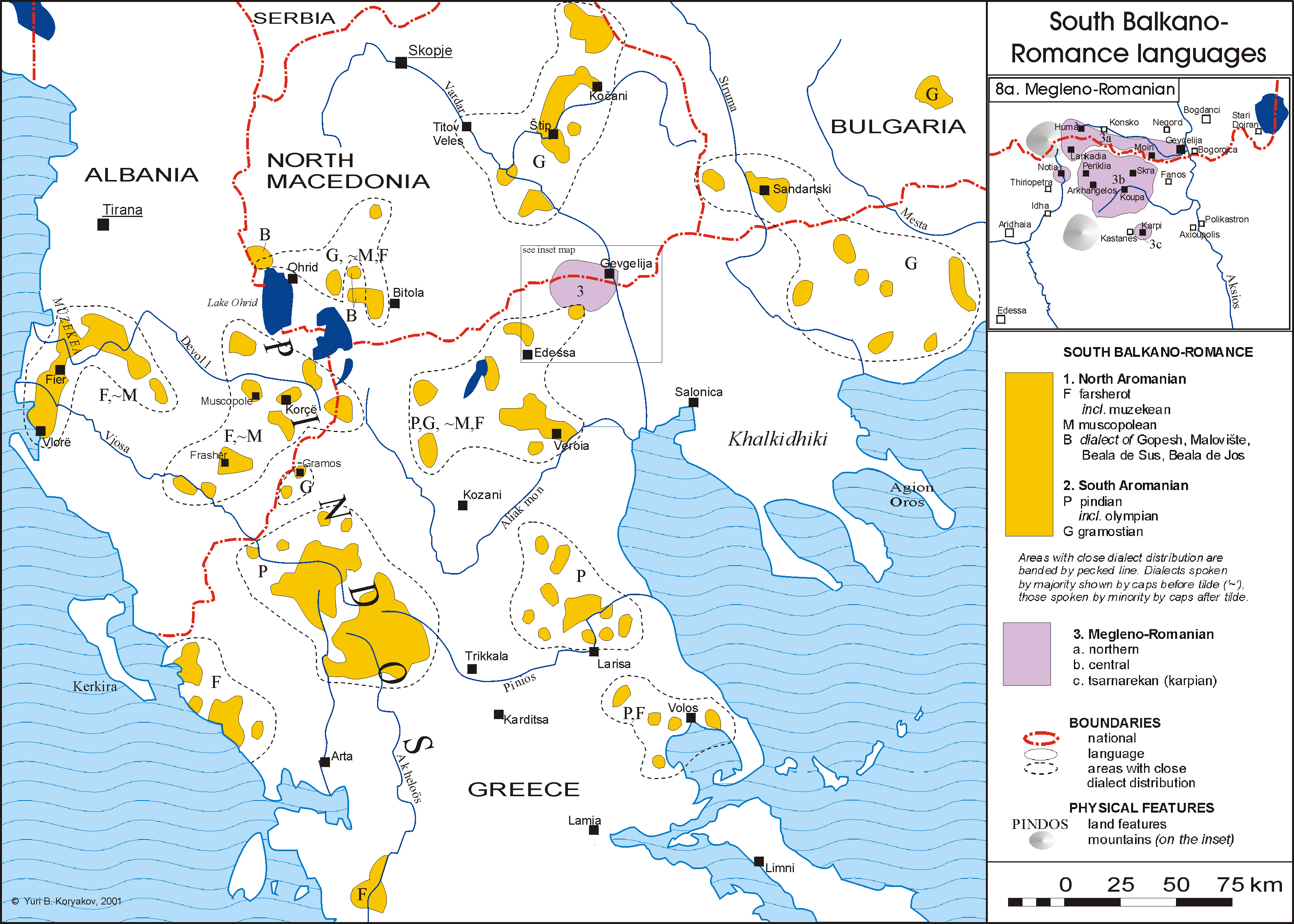
Distribution of the Aromanians.

After the First Balkan War most of the Romanian schools were closed down. Many of the Aromanian villages were destroyed during World War I. To escape the conflict many Aromanians fled to Greece or Romania. Aromanians who lived in what is now known as North Macedonia were subject to strict Serbianization along with the rest of the population. After the outbreak of World War II most Aromanians once again found themselves subject to Bulgarian control. Many Aromanians joined the Communist Partisans.

After the war many Aromanians began to assert their ethnic identity. High levels of intermarriage with Macedonians and urbanization also began to affect the community. In the 1970s new initiatives were started to create Aromanian social and cultural societies. The Society of Arts and Culture (Aromanian: Sutsata di Culturi sh Arti) was established in 1979 and in 1981 another cultural society was established. In 1985 the first Aromanian song was recorded by Risto Pulevski-Kicha. A tape was made for Macedonian television and this tape was used to support the request to create a cultural society. The Pitu Guli society of Skopje and the Manaki Brothers Society of Bitola were founded.

After the Declaration of Independence from Yugoslavia, Aromanians were officially recognised as a minority group. They receive full minority rights from the Macedonian government. Currently, the Aromanians have two political parties on North Macedonia, the Democratic Union of the Vlachs of Macedonia (DSVM) and the Party of the Vlachs of Macedonia (PVM). Both have little political importance and have no seats in the Parliament of North Macedonia. The only other Aromanian political party apart from these two is the Party of the Vlachs of Albania (PVSH) in Albania.

== Minority status ==
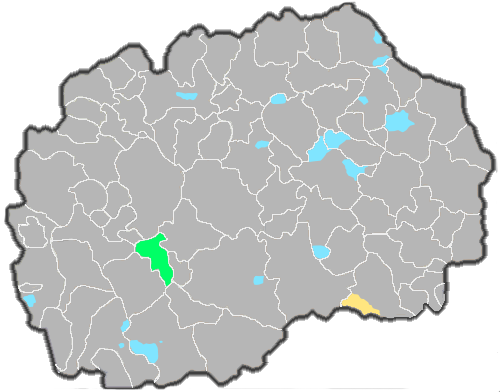
Distribution of Aromanians in North Macedonia: Areas where Aromanians are an officially recognised minority group Areas where Aromanians are concentrated Areas where Megleno-Romanians are concentrated

The Aromanians are an officially recognised minority group in North Macedonia under the name "Vlachs". The Aromanian language is taught among Aromanian students and the language is co-official in the Krusevo municipality. Aromanian-language media is available, and regular television and radio broadcasts in the Aromanian language help to ensure its survival. The Aromanian National Day is officially celebrated in North Macedonia on May 23. The Aromanians are represented in the political life of North Macedonia through two parties.

== Culture ==
The Aromanian National Day is celebrated on May 23.

=== Language ===
Aromanians have traditionally spoken the Aromanian language. Use of this language has recently been in a period of decline. High rates of intermarriage with Macedonians and assimilation have reduced the number of speakers. The Kruševo municipality is the only place in the world where the Aromanian language is a recognised minority language. The language has recently undergone a revival and is now taught to Aromanian students throughout the country. While 8,714 individuals declared Aromanian ethnicity in the 2021 census, only 3,151 declared Aromanian to be their mother tongue.

== Media ==
Many forms of Aromanian-language media have been established since the 1990s. The Macedonian Government provides financial assistance to Aromanian-language newspapers and radio stations. Aromanian-language newspapers such as Phoenix (Aromanian: Fenix) service the Aromanian community. The Aromanian television program Spark (Aromanian: Scanteao, Macedonian: Искра) broadcasts on the second channel of the Macedonian Radio-Television.

== Censuses ==
Vlachs in SR Macedonia and R. of Macedonia according to censuses 1948-2002
Ethnic group	census 1948		census 1953		census 1961		census 1971		census 1981		census 1991		census 1994		census 2002	
Ethnic group	Number	%	Number	%	Number	%	Number	%	Number	%	Number	%	Number	%	Number	%
Vlachs	9,511	0.8	8,668	0.7	8,046	0.6	7,190	0.4	6,392	0.3	7,764	0.4	8,601	0.4	9,695	0.5

=== 1900 census ===
Population of Aromanians in Ottoman Vardar Macedonia, 1900
Region	Population
Veles	500
Kavadarci	122
Gevgelija	9430
Skopje	450
Tetovo	50
Kumanovo	50
Kratovo	340
Kriva Palanka	220
Kočani	2020
Bitola	15690
Kruševo	4095
Resen	3210
Prilep	745
Ohrid	1960
Total	38,882

=== 2021 census ===
Municipalities with more than 100 Ethnic Aromanians (Власи), according to the 2021 census:

Municipality	Aromanians
Aerodrom	652
Gazi Baba	185
Gjorče Petrov	156
Karpoš	483
Kisela Voda	636
Centar	552
Bitola	1205
Veles	270
Gevgelija	266
Kočani	170
Kruševo	867
Kumanovo	117
Ohrid	314
Sveti Nikole	134
Struga	492
Štip	1584

== Notable people ==
- Dimitri Atanasescu (1836–1907) – educator
- Constantin Belimace (1848–1932) – Aromanian writer
- Leon Boga (1886–1974) – Aromanian writer, schoolteacher and archivist in Romania
- Kaliopi Bukle (1966– ) – pop singer; half Aromanian
- Theodor Capidan (1879–1953) – linguist and academic
- Petre Čašule (1882–1924) – revolutionary
- Taki Fiti (1950– ) – Minister of Finance, 1996-1998
- Pitu Guli (1865–1903) – Ilinden revolutionary
- Taki Hrisik (1920–1983) – composer and musician
- Constantin Iotzu (1884–1962) – architect
- Niku Karanika (1910–2002) – Aromanian poet
- Hari Kostov (1959– ) – Minister of Internal Affairs, 2002-2004; prime minister of Macedonia, May–November 2004
- Jani Makraduli (1965– ) – politician in the Republic of Macedonia
- Milton Manakis (1878–1954) – cinematographic pioneer; with Yannakis Manakis, the first people to film the Balkans
- Yannakis Manakis (1882–1964) – cinematographic pioneer; with Milton Manakis, the first people to film the Balkans
- Apostol Margarit (1832–1903) – educator
- Miho Mihajlovski (1915-2003) – Macedonian revolutionary
- Ștefan Mihăileanu (1859-1900) – Aromanian nationalist
- Atanasios Piteon (1836–1913) – revolutionary
- Cincar-Janko (1779–1833) – Serbian revolutionary
- Toše Proeski (1981–2007) – pop singer
- Alexandros Svolos (1892–1956) – Greek politician

== See also ==
- Aromanians in Albania
- Aromanians in Bulgaria
- Aromanians in Greece
- Aromanians in Romania
- Aromanians in Serbia

== Bibliography ==
- Bechev, D. (2019). Historical Dictionary of North Macedonia. Historical Dictionaries of Europe. Rowman & Littlefield Publishers. ISBN 978-1-5381-1962-4.
- Commissioner, United Nations High (30 December 2022). "Former Yugoslav Republic of Macedonia". Refworld.
- Ersoy, A.; Trencsényi, B.; Kopeček, M.; Górny, M.; Kechriotis, V. (2006). Late Enlightenment: Emergence of modern national ides. Discourses of Collective Identity in Central and Southeast Europe. Central European University Press. ISBN 978-963-7326-52-3.
- Evans, T.; Briggs, P. (2019). North Macedonia. Bradt Travel Guide. Macedonia. Bradt Travel Guides. ISBN 978-1-78477-084-6.
- Koço, E. (2015). A Journey of the Vocal Iso(n). Cambridge Scholars Publisher. ISBN 978-1-4438-7578-3.
- Minahan, J. (2013). Miniature Empires: A Historical Dictionary of the Newly Independent States. Taylor & Francis. ISBN 978-1-135-94010-2.
- Minahan, J. (2002). Encyclopedia of the Stateless Nations: Ethnic and National Groups Around the World A-Z [4 Volumes]. ABC-CLIO. ISBN 978-0-313-07696-1.
- Poulton, H. (1995). Who are the Macedonians?. Hurst. ISBN 978-1-85065-238-0.
- Trencsényi, B.; Janowski, M.; Baar, M.; Falina, M.; Kopecek, M. (2016). A History of Modern Political Thought in East Central Europe: Volume I: Negotiating Modernity in the 'Long Nineteenth Century'. OUP Oxford. ISBN 978-0-19-105695-6.
