= Party of the Vlachs of Macedonia =

Aromanian minority political party in North Macedonia

Party of the Vlachs of Macedonia Партија на Власите од Македонија (Macedonian) Partia Armãnjilor ditu Machidunie (Aromanian)
- Abbreviation: PVM
- Founded: 2001
- Headquarters: Skopje
- Ideology: Aromanian minority politics
- National affiliation: Renewal

The Party of the Vlachs of Macedonia (PVM; Macedonian: Партија на Власите од Македонија, romanized: Partija na Vlasite od Makedonija, ПВМ; Aromanian: Partia Armãnjilor ditu Machidunie, PAM), sometimes simply referred to as the Party of the Vlachs or the Vlach Party (Macedonian: Партијата на Власите; Aromanian: Partia Armãnjilor), is one of the two political parties in North Macedonia representative of the Aromanian minority of the country, the other being the Democratic Union of the Vlachs of Macedonia (DSVM).

It was founded in 2001 in Skopje by Mite Kostov Papuli (Aromanian: Mite Costov Papuli, Mita Costov Papuli), who was also a member of several many other Aromanian organizations of North Macedonia. Papuli died in 2020, at age 61, as a result of COVID-19.

In March 2020, the PVM joined the Renewal coalition, which includes parties such as VMRO-DPMNE.

In 2021, a representative of PVM, the DSVM and some other Aromanian organizations of North Macedonia met with the President of North Macedonia Stevo Pendarovski on the occasion of the Aromanian National Day celebrated every 23 May and demanded a constituency with guaranteed seats on the Parliament of North Macedonia for representatives of the national Aromanian minority. The situation of the minority in the country and the progress made so far in their minority rights were also discussed.

== See also ==
- Party of the Vlachs of Albania, the only Aromanian political party outside North Macedonia
- Democratic Union of the Vlachs of Macedonia, the other Aromanian political party in North Macedonia
