= Greece–Romania relations =

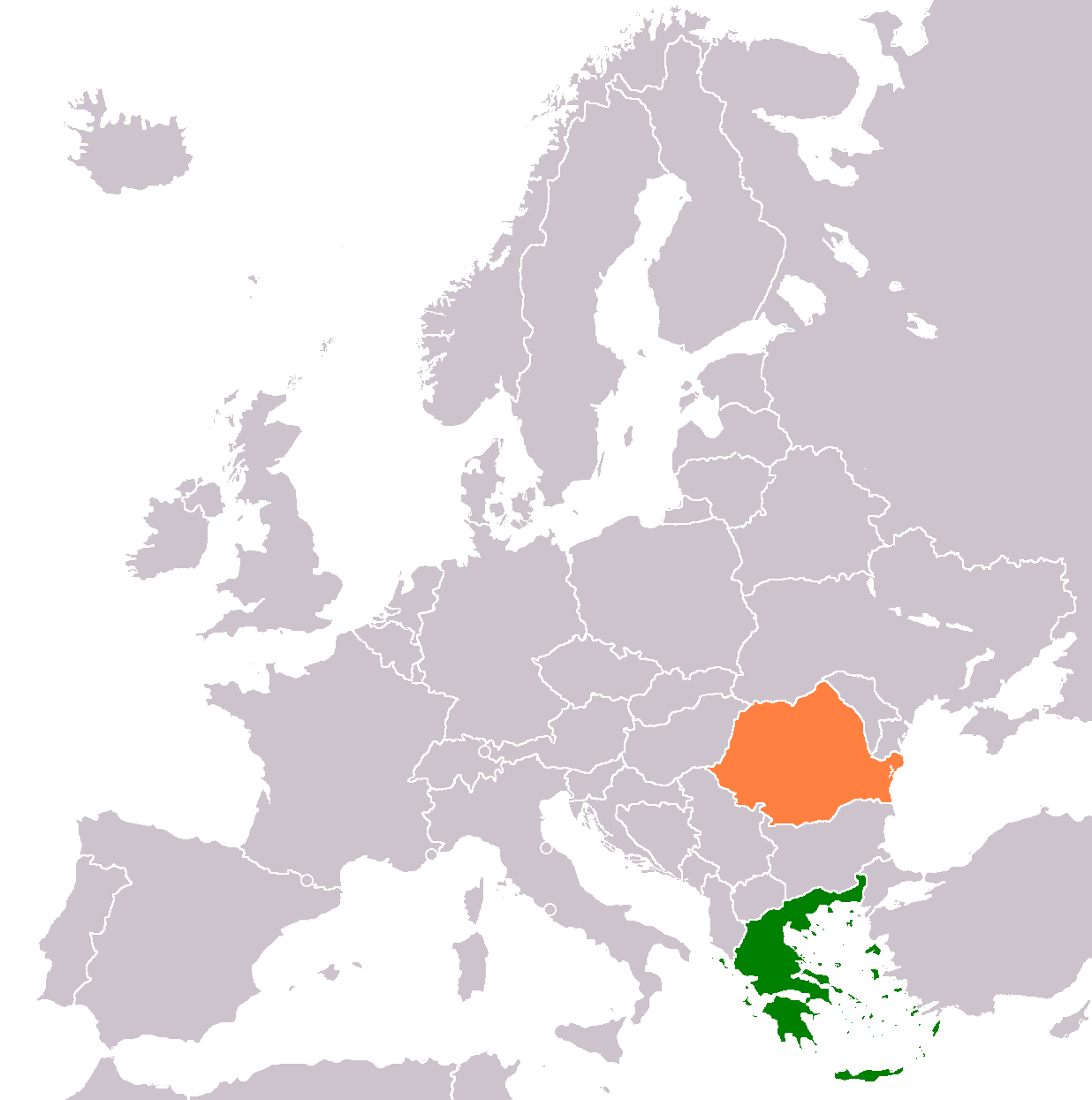
- Greece: Romania

Greece–Romania relations are the bilateral relations between Greece and Romania. Both countries are full members of the Council of Europe, Organization for Security and Co-operation in Europe, European Union, NATO and United Nations.

== Country comparison ==
	Romania	Greece
Population	19,051,562	10,482,487
Area	238,398 km^{2} (92,103 sq mi)	131,957 km^{2} (50,949 sq mi)
Population Density	78/km^{2} (203/sq mi)	97/km^{2} (250/sq mi)
Capital	Bucharest	Athens
Largest City	Bucharest – 1,739,297	Athens – 3,059,764
Government	Unitary semi-presidential republic	Unitary parliamentary republic
Current leader	President Nicușor Dan; Prime Minister Ilie Bolojan	President Konstantinos Tasoulas; Prime Minister Kyriakos Mitsotakis
Official languages	Romanian	Greek
Main religions	73.86% Romanian Orthodoxy, 5.97% Protestantism, 4.5% Catholicism, 0.3% Islam	90% Greek Orthodox (official), 3% other Christian, 4% no religion, 2% Islam, 1% other
Ethnic groups	89.3% Romanians, 6.0% Hungarians	99% Greeks, 1% Others
GDP (nominal)	US$ 480.834 billion ($25,693 per capita)	US$ 307.554 billion ($29,696 per capita)

== Early period ==
The Greek presence in what is now Romania dates back as far as the apoikiai (colonies) and emporia (trade stations) founded in and around Dobruja (see Colonies in antiquity and Pontic Greeks), beginning in the 7th century BC. Starting with the Milesian colony at Istros, the process reached its height after Tomis was founded in the 5th century BC. Although forever subject to the Dacian interference and easily disrupted by changes in the politics of neighbour tribal chieftains, the colonies prospered until being briefly submitted in various forms by King Burebista (late 1st century BC). Immediately after, and for the following centuries, they were stripped of their privileges by their new Roman masters, and followed the Empire into its crises.

Greco–Romanian relations can be traced back hundreds of years when the two peoples formed a bastion of the Greco-Roman world in the Balkans. They were to continue into the 14th century when the Principalities of Moldavia and Wallachia became a refuge for Greeks fleeing from the rapidly declining Byzantine Empire. During the period of Ottoman domination, Greek Phanariotes played an important role in the political and cultural life of modern-day Romania. Their influence was one of the reasons that revolutionaries launched the Greek War of Independence in the Danubian Principalities instead of Greece itself. Negotiations between the United Principalities and the now independent Greek state during the period of 1866–1869 proved fruitless, thanks both to Romanian hopes of achieving independence through dialog and the birth of Romanian national historiography that sharply criticized the Phanariotes. Events surrounding the Great Eastern Crisis such as the foundation of the Bulgarian Exarchate and the threat of Pan-Slavism reversed the situation. The Treaty of Berlin (1878) marked not only the creation of an independent Romania but also the restoration of amiable diplomatic relations between the two states. Having abandoned all claims to Transylvania and Bukovina, Romania turned its attention to the Bulgarian-held Southern Dobruja. Since the area's Romanian population was sparse, Romania sought to instill nationalist ideals to the Aromanians populating the Ottoman-controlled Macedonia. The Aromanians were then to settle in South Dobruja, thus reinforcing Romanian claims to the region.

Organizations such as the Macedo-Romanian Cultural Society funded ethnographic expeditions to Macedonia, Epirus and Thessaly, funding being allocated to the creation of Romanian speaking schools and churches. This coincided with the wider Macedonian Struggle conflict, where similar organizations of Greek, Bulgarian and Serbian origin not only propagated their culture, but also engaged in armed struggle against each other and the Ottoman authorities. Romanian influence in Macedonia remained limited as its schools lacked the needed funding. Moreover, Aromanians struggled to adapt to the Romanian language as taught in the schools. In 1896 Ottoman authorities refused to appoint a Romanian metropolitan bishop to the Aromanian communities. Romanian authorities bribed Ottoman officials with 100,000 golden francs, however when the Ottoman sultan demanded a formal alliance, the Romanians broke the negotiations. Another important issue was the status of the inheritances of Greeks in Romania. In 1892, Romania refused to hand over the property of the recently deceased Greek expatriate Konstantinos Zappas, to the Greek state, citing an article of the Romanian constitution forbidding foreign nationals from owning agricultural land. The Trikoupis government then recalled its ambassador in Bucharest. Romania followed suit, thus severing diplomatic relations between the two countries. Diplomatic relations were restored in July 1896, in response to a rise of Bulgarian komitadji activity in Macedonia. The assassination of Romanian professor Ștefan Mihăileanu by a komitadji agent on 22 July 1900, caused panic in Bucharest amidst fears of an impending war with Bulgaria. On 24 April 1904, a group of pro–Romanian Aromanians submitted a petition to the Ecumenical Patriarchate of Constantinople demanding greater autonomy including the administration of church service in the Aromanian language instead of Greek. The Patriarchate viewed the incident as a Romanian provocation, citing the fact that the translations of religious texts were not officially approved. As a result, it declined the petition. In 1905, the two countries exchanged accusations regarding the Aromanian Question. Romania claimed that Greek armed bands targeted ethnic Romanians in Macedonia, whereas Greece accused Romania of trying to create a false equation between Aromanians and Romanians.

Hellenophobic articles began appearing in the Romanian press. On 2 August 1905, the Society of Macedono–Romanian Culture organized an anti–Greek protest in Bucharest, attended by army officers, students, and Aromanians (or "Vlachs"). After decrying Greek war crimes in Macedonia, the organizers called for a boycott of Greek products and services. Rioting was prevented by a large force of Romanian gendarmerie. On the same day, a Greek owned cafe in Bucharest was vandalized and its owner beaten. Several days later, three editors of the Greek language newspaper Patris were expelled from the country for sedition. On 13 August, protesters burnt a Greek flag in Giurgiu. An official remonstrance by the Greek ambassador Tombazis was rebutted leading to a mutual withdrawal of embassies on 15 September. In November, the Romanian government allocated funding for the creation of armed Aromanian bands in Macedonia, a parallel motion closed numerous Greek schools in the country. In February 1906, six leading members of the Greek community were expelled from the country, citing their alleged funding of Greek bands in Macedonia. In July 1906, the Greek government officially cut diplomatic relations with Romania.

In 1911, Greek prime minister Eleftherios Venizelos used the occasion of the Italo-Turkish War to improve relations with Bulgaria and Romania, restoring diplomatic relations with the latter. The Balkan League which included Bulgaria and Greece defeated the Ottomans in the First Balkan War. The League broke at the conclusion of the war, with the former participants and Romania soundly defeating Bulgaria in the Second Balkan War. At the Treaty of Bucharest (1913), Romania supported Greek claims to Kavala, whereas Venizelos granted concessions to the Aromanians. The Aromanian Question which had already lost steam due to Romanian gains in north Bulgaria came to a conclusion. The Greco–Romanian alliance was further solidified during World War I when both countries sided with the Triple Entente.

== Interwar period ==
In the aftermath of the Greco-Turkish War (1919–1922), Greece found itself to be in the midst of an internal political crisis. The situation exacerbated by the emergence of the Kingdom of Yugoslavia in the north, Italy's imperial ambitions in the eastern Mediterranean Sea and Turkey's resurgence as a regional power. The 1923 Corfu incident showcased the inability of the League of Nations to protect the interests of smaller countries such as Greece from the encroachments of Italy. In 1924, Yugoslavia unilaterally cancelled the Greek–Serbian Alliance of 1913. In the meantime irrevocable differences with Bulgaria prevented the two countries from normalizing relations. Romanian diplomats Ion I. C. Brătianu and Nicolae Titulescu perceived the fact that Romania was surrounded by Slavic countries as a threat to its security. Thessaloniki's appeal as a potential artery for Romanian exports further increased the possibility of a Greco–Romanian alliance. In 1927, Alexandru Averescu and Andreas Michalakopoulos engaged in discussions regarding the conclusion of a non-aggression pact. Michalaokopoulos agreed to the establishment of a railway line between the two countries, given that it would not be utilized for military purposes. That meant that Romania was to engage in a military confrontation against Bulgaria, shall the latter use the railway to deploy its military against Greece. Negotiations were temporary halted as Romanian diplomats pondered on how to preserve a balance between their involvement with the French led Little Entente and Italy which supported Romanian claims in Bessarabia. In January 1928, Titulescu secured Benito Mussolini's approval for a Greco–Romanian treaty.

Negotiations with Greece resumed in March 1928, during a regular League of Nations conference in Geneva. The Greek–Romanian Non-Aggression and Arbitration Pact was signed by Michalaokopoulos and Titulescu on 21 March. The two sides agreed to abstain from engaging each other in military confrontations, instead resolving their differences through diplomatic channels. According to the rules previously laid out by the League of Nations. In 1931, Venizelos visited Bucharest to conclude the Greek–Romanian Trade and Shipping Agreement with his counterpart Nicolae Iorga.

== Modern day ==
Since the fall of the Soviet Union and the return of democracy in Romania, many Romanians have emigrated to Greece for economic reasons. Both countries are full members of the European Union, the Council of Europe, NATO and the Organization of the Black Sea Economic Cooperation (BSEC).

Greece has warmly supported and contributed to Romania's entry into NATO and prompt accession into the European Union. Greece was the fifth member state of the EU and first among the old members to ratify the Treaty of Accession of Bulgaria and Romania to the EU. According to the Greek Ministry of Foreign Affairs, in 2006 Greece was among the three top investors in Romania, with almost 800 active businesses and invested capital totalling 3 billion euros. According to the General Secretariat for Greeks Abroad, the Greek community in Romania numbers 14,000.

== Tourism ==
Greece has generally been one of the most popular tourist destinations for Romanians. In 2022, 1,378,758 Romanians visited Greece, making it the most popular tourist destination among Romanians. 93,196 Greeks in turn visited Romania in 2022.

== Resident diplomatic missions ==
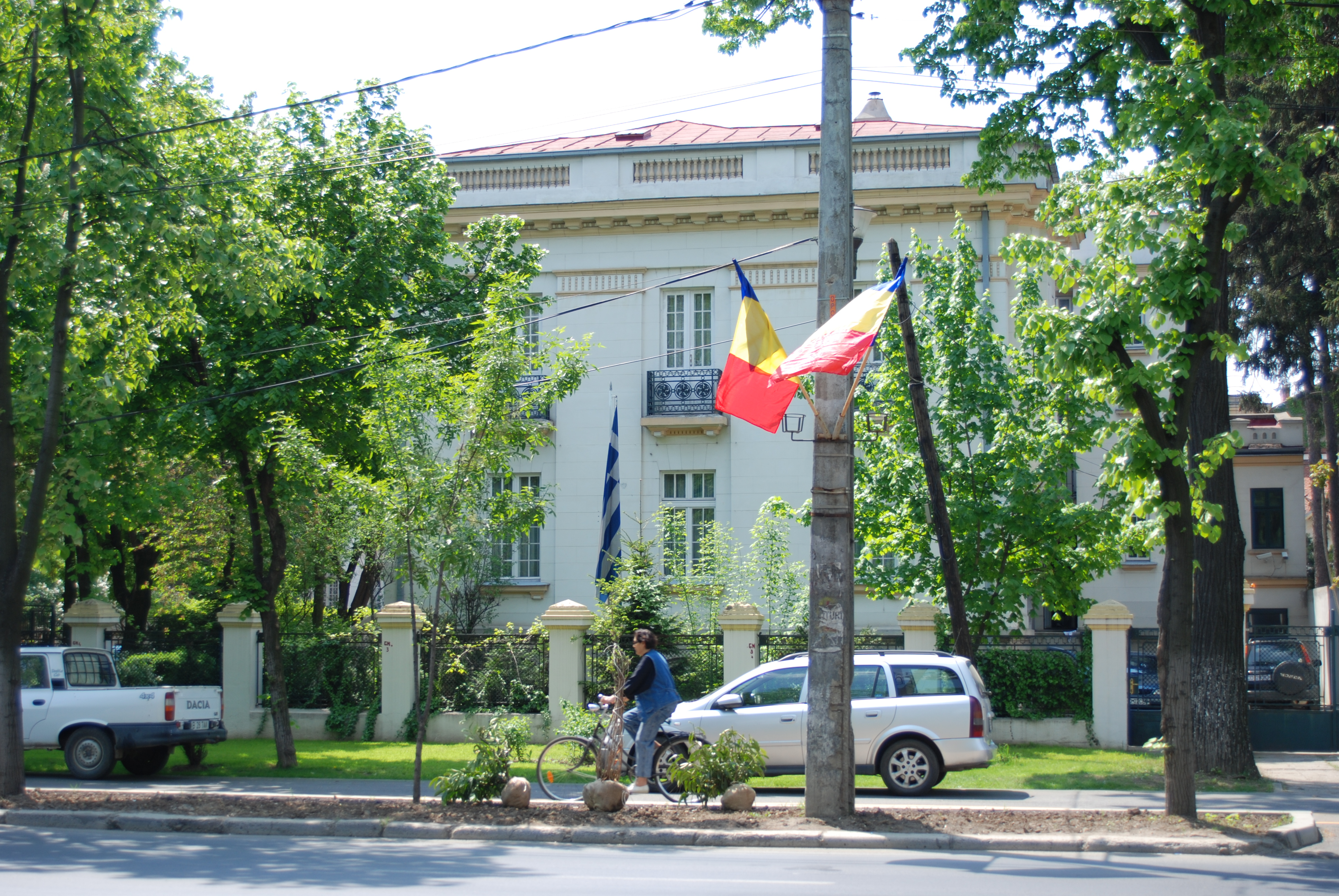
Embassy of Greece in Bucharest

- Greece has an embassy in Bucharest.
- Romania has an embassy in Athens and a consulate-general in Thessaloniki.

== See also ==
- Foreign relations of Greece
- Foreign relations of Romania
- Aromanian Question
- Greeks in Romania
- Phanariotes
- Greek War of Independence
- Hellenic Union of Romania
- Aromanians in Greece
