= Greek–Romanian Non-Aggression and Arbitration Pact =

1928 non-aggression pact between Greece and Romania

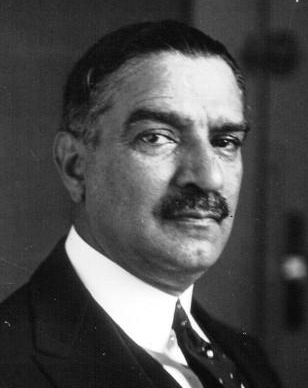
Andreas Michalakopoulos in 1927

The Greek–Romanian Non-Aggression and Arbitration Pact was a non-aggression pact signed between Greece and Romania on 21 March 1928. The pact effectively ended Greece's diplomatic isolation within the Balkan peninsula, strengthening its position on the negotiating table with Bulgaria, Yugoslavia and Turkey. Romania on the other hand gained a regional ally against its Slavic neighbors.

== Background ==
Greco–Romanian relations can be traced back hundreds of years when the two formed a bastion of the Greco-Roman world in Balkans. They were to continue into the 14th century when the Principalities of Moldavia and Wallachia became a refuge for Greeks fleeing from the rapidly declining Byzantine Empire. During the period of Ottoman domination Greek Phanariotes played an important role in the political and cultural life of modern-day Romania. Their influence being one of the reason that the Greek War of Independence was launched in the Danubian Principalities instead of Greece itself. Negotiations between the United Principalities and the now independent Greek state during the period of 1866–1869 proved fruitless. Romanian hopes of achieving independence through dialog in conjunction with the birth of Romanian national historiography which sharply criticized the Phanariotes being the main obstacles. Events surrounding the Great Eastern Crisis such as the foundation of the Bulgarian Exarchate and the threat of Pan-Slavism reversed the situation. The Treaty of Berlin (1878) marked not only the creation of an independent Romania but also the restoration of amiable diplomatic relations between the two states.

Organizations such as the Macedo-Romanian Cultural Society funded ethnographic expeditions to Macedonia, Epirus and Thessaly, funding was allocated to the creation of Romanian speaking schools and churches for the Aromanians. This coincided with the wider Macedonian Struggle conflict where similar organizations of Greek, Bulgarian and Serbian origin not only propagated their culture but also engaged in armed struggle against each other and the Ottoman authorities. Romanian influence in Macedonia remained limited as its schools lacked the necessary funding, moreover the Aromanians struggled to adapt to the Romanian language as taught in the schools. In 1896 Ottoman authorities refused to appoint a Romanian metropolitan bishop to the Aromanian communities. Romanian authorities bribed Ottoman officials with 100,000 gold francs, however when the Ottoman sultan demanded a formal alliance the Romanians broke off negotiations. Another important issue was the status of the inheritances of Greeks in Romania.

In 1892, Romania refused to hand over the property of the recently deceased Greek expatriate Konstantinos Zappas to the Greek state, citing an article of the Romanian constitution forbidding foreign nationals from owning agricultural land. The then Greek government under Charilaos Trikoupisn recalled its ambassador in Bucharest and Romania followed suit, thus severing diplomatic relations between the two countries. Diplomatic relations were restored in July 1896, in response to a rise of Bulgarian komitadji activity in Macedonia. The assassination of Romanian professor Ștefan Mihăileanu by a komitadji agent on 22 July 1900, caused panic in Bucharest amidst fears of an impending war with Bulgaria. On 24 April 1904, a group of pro–Romanian Aromanians submitted a petition to the Ecumenical Patriarchate of Constantinople demanding greater autonomy, including the administration of church service in the Aromanian language instead of Greek. The Patriarchate viewed the incident as a Romanian provocation, citing the fact that the translations of religious texts were not officially approved it declined the petition. In 1905, the two countries exchanged accusations regarding the Aromanian question. Romania claimed that Greek armed bands targeted ethnic Romanians in Macedonia, whereas Greece accused Romania of trying to create a false equation between Aromanians and Romanians.

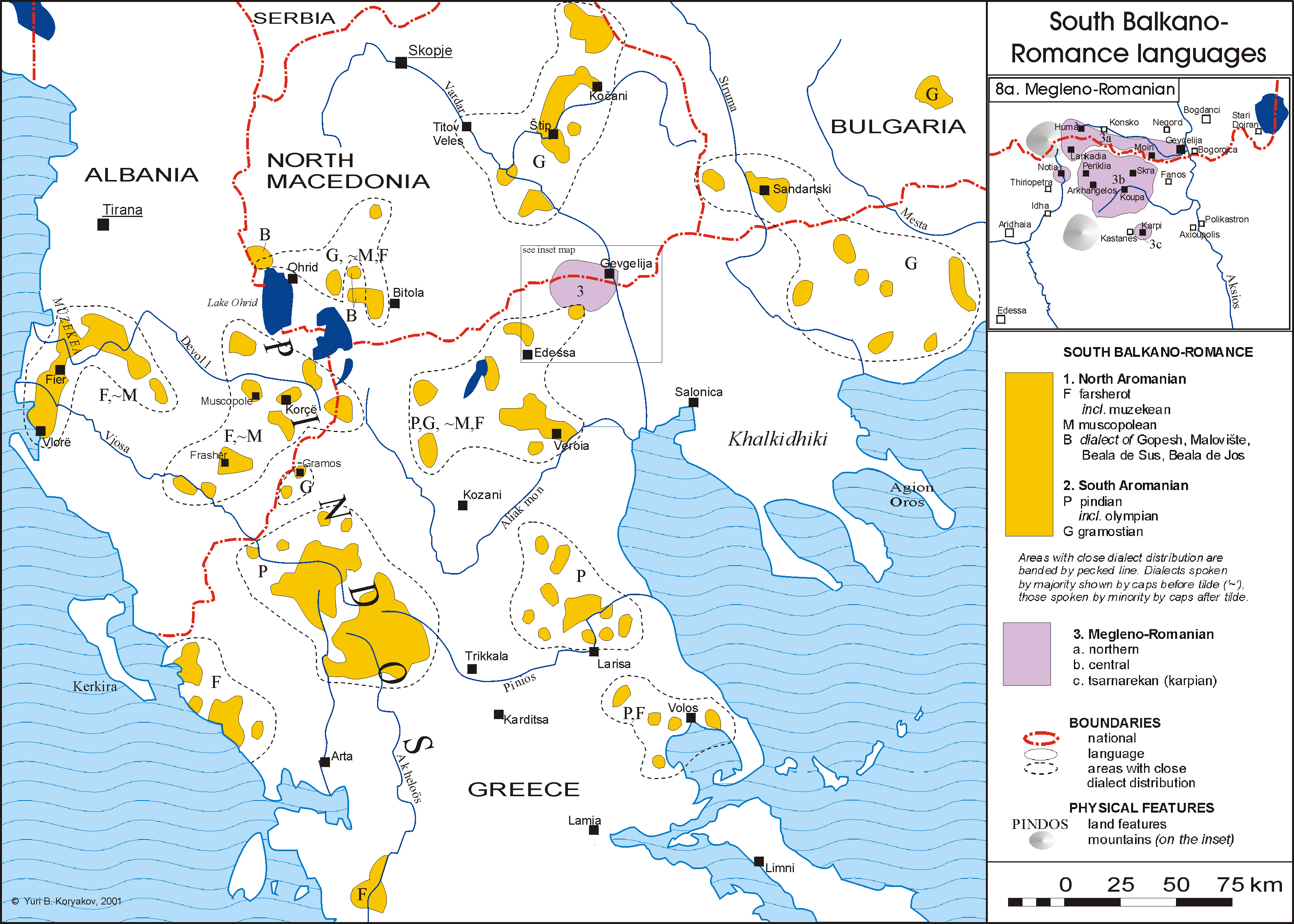
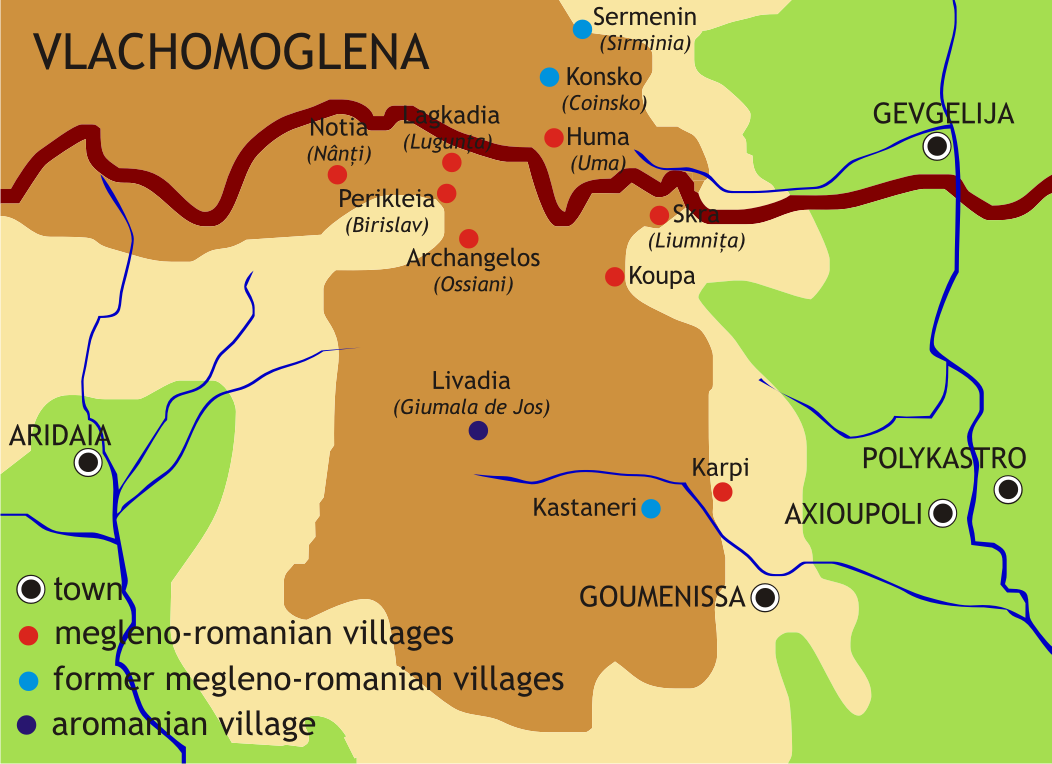
Left: Map of the Megleno-Romanians settlements.Right: The Megleno-Romanian and the Aromanian linguistic area.

Hellenophobic articles began appearing in the Romanian press. On 2 August 1905, the Macedo-Romanian Cultural Society organized an anti–Greek protest in Bucharest, attended by army officers, students and Aromanians. After decrying Greek war crimes in Macedonia, the organizers called for a boycott of Greek products and services. Rioting was prevented by a large force of Romanian gendarmerie. On the same day a Greek-owned cafe in Bucharest was vandalized and its owner beaten. Several days later three editors of the Greek-language newspaper Patris were expelled from the country for sedition. On 13 August, protesters burnt a Greek flag in Giurgiu. An official remonstrance by the Greek ambassador Tombazis was rebutted, leading to a mutual withdrawal of embassies on 15 September.

In November, the Romanian government allocated funding for the creation of armed Aromanian bands in Macedonia, and in a parallel move closed numerous Greek schools in the country. In February 1906, six leading members of the Greek community were expelled from the country, citing their alleged funding of Greek bands in Macedonia. In July 1906, the Greek government officially cut diplomatic relations with Romania. In 1911, Greek prime minister Eleftherios Venizelos used the occasion of the Italo-Turkish War to improve relations with Bulgaria and Romania, restoring diplomatic relations with the latter. The Balkan League, which included Bulgaria and Greece, defeated the Ottomans in the First Balkan War. The League broke at the conclusion of the war, with the former participants and Romania soundly defeating Bulgaria in the Second Balkan War. At the Treaty of Bucharest (1913), Romania supported Greek claims to Kavala, whereas Venizelos granted concessions to the Aromanians. The Greco–Romanian alliance was further solidified during World War I when both countries sided with the Triple Entente.

Balkans animation 1800–2008

In the aftermath of the Greco-Turkish War (1919–1922), Greece found itself to be in the midst of an internal political crisis. The situation exacerbated by the emergence of the Kingdom of Yugoslavia in the north, Italian imperial ambitions in the eastern Mediterranean Sea and the resurgence of Turkey as a regional power. The 1923 Corfu incident showcased the inability of the League of Nations to protect the interests of smaller countries such as Greece from the encroachments of Italy. In 1924, Yugoslavia unilaterally cancelled the Greek–Serbian Alliance of 1913. In the meantime irrevocable differences with Bulgaria prevented the two countries from normalizing relations. Romanian diplomats Ion I. C. Brătianu and Nicolae Titulescu perceived the fact that Romania was surrounded by Slavic countries as a threat to its security. Thessaloniki's appeal as a potential artery for Romanian exports further increased the possibility of a Greco–Romanian alliance. In 1927, Alexandru Averescu and Andreas Michalakopoulos engaged in discussions regarding the conclusion of a non-aggression pact. Michalakopoulos agreed to the establishment of a railway line between the two countries, given that it would not be utilized for military purposes. That meant that Romania was to engage in a military confrontation against Bulgaria, shall the latter use the railway to deploy its military against Greece. Negotiations were temporarily halted as Romanian diplomats pondered on how to preserve a balance between their involvement with the French-led Little Entente and Italy which supported Romanian claims in Bessarabia. In January 1928, Titulescu secured Benito Mussolini's approval for a Greco–Romanian treaty.

== Treaty ==
Negotiations with Greece resumed in March 1928, during a regular League of Nations conference in Geneva. The Greek–Romanian Non-Aggression and Arbitration Pact was signed by Michalakopoulos and Titulescu on 21 March. The two sides agreed to abstain from engaging each other in military confrontations, instead resolving their differences through diplomatic channels, according to the rules previously laid out by the League of Nations.

== Aftermath ==
The pact effectively ended Greece's diplomatic isolation within the Balkan peninsula, strengthening its position on the negotiating table with Bulgaria, Yugoslavia and Turkey. Venizelos' rejection of the Little Entente as a central European alliance alien to Greece paved the way for the Greco–Italian Treaty of 1928, which in turn led to diplomatic agreements with Yugoslavia and Turkey in 1929 and 1930 respectively. In 1931, Venizelos visits Bucharest to conclude the Greek–Romanian Trade and Shipping Agreement with his counterpart Nicolae Iorga.
