= Democratic Union of the Vlachs of Macedonia =

Aromanian minority political party in North Macedonia

Democratic Union of the Vlachs of Macedonia Демократски сојуз на Власите од Македонија (Macedonian) Unia Democratã a Armãnjlor dit Machidunii (Aromanian)
- Abbreviation: DSVM
- President: Nikola Babovski
- Founded: 2002
- Headquarters: Skopje
- Ideology: Aromanian minority politics
- National affiliation: For a European Future

Party flag

The Democratic Union of the Vlachs of Macedonia (DSVM; Macedonian: Демократски сојуз на Власите од Македонија, romanized: Demokratski sojuz na Vlasite od Makedonija, ДСВМ; Aromanian: Unia Democratã a Armãnjlor dit Machidunii, UDAM) is one of the two political parties of North Macedonia representing the Aromanian minority of the country, the other being the Party of the Vlachs of Macedonia (PVM). The president of the DSVM is Nikola Babovski (Aromanian: Nicola Babovschi, Nico Babovschi). It was founded in 2002.

The Aromanians are a Balkan Romance-speaking ethnic group living, among other countries, in North Macedonia. Officially, they are known as "Vlachs" and are around 9,695 people in the country according to the 2002 Macedonian census. However, there are claims that, in fact, the Aromanians number over 80,000, which the DSVM backs.

The DSVM has little political relevance and lacks an official website on the Internet. Information on its members, leadership and structure is also limited. It has been part of the We Can coalition together with parties such as the Social Democratic Union of Macedonia (SDSM) for many years.

In 2021, the DSVM and other Aromanian organizations of North Macedonia, including the PVM through a representative of the party, met with the President of North Macedonia Stevo Pendarovski on the occasion of the Aromanian National Day celebrated every 23 May and asked for a constituency with guaranteed seats on the Parliament of North Macedonia for representatives of the Aromanian minority of the country. The situation of the minority in North Macedonia and the progress made so far in their minority rights were also discussed.

== See also ==
- Party of the Vlachs of Albania, the only Aromanian political party outside North Macedonia
- Party of the Vlachs of Macedonia, the other Aromanian political party in North Macedonia
