= Anti-Greek sentiment =

Discrimination against the Greek people

Anti-Greek sentiment, also known as Hellenophobia (Greek: ελληνοφοβία, romanized: ellinophobía), anti-Hellenism (Greek: ανθελληνισμός, romanized: anthellinismós), mishellenism (Greek: μισελληνισμός, romanized: misellinismós), or Greek-bashing, refers to negative attitudes, dislike, hatred, derision, racism, prejudice, stereotypes, or discrimination towards Greeks, the Hellenic Republic, or Greek culture. Hellenophobia is the opposite of philhellenism.

== Historic ==
=== Ancient Rome ===
In the mid–Republican period, Roman intellectuals, both phil-Hellenic and anti-Hellenic, were involved in a conflict over Greek influence. One author explains, "the relationship of Romans to Greek culture was frequently ambiguous: they admired it as superior and adopted its criteria, while they remained skeptical of some aspects; hence they adapted it selectively according to their own purposes." An anti-Hellenic movement emerged in reaction to the primacy of Greek, led by the conservative and reactionary statesman Cato the Elder (234–149 BC), who was the first to write a Roman history in Latin and was prominent for his anti-Hellenic views. He considered Hellenism as a threat to Roman culture; however, his views did not receive widespread public approval, especially amongst the upper class of Roman society. However, Erich S. Gruen argued that Cato's "anti-Greek 'pronouncements' reflect deliberate posturing and do not represent 'the core of Catonian thought'." The prominent philosopher and politician Cicero (106–43 BC) was "highly ambivalent" about Greeks, and practiced "anti-Greek slur." The first-second century poet Juvenal was another major anti-Hellenic figure.

=== Latin West ===
In the aftermath of the East–West Schism of 1054, anti-Greek sentiments gained widespread traction in the Latin West (dominated by the Roman Catholic Church). It reached its climax during the Fourth Crusade, most notably, with the 1204 sack of Constantinople, the capital of the Byzantine Empire, by the Crusader and Venetian forces, and the subsequent establishment of the Latin Empire by the Crusaders.

=== East Sicily, Calabria, and Malta ===
In East Sicily, Calabria, and Malta, Christian Greeks were persecuted by Arabs during the period of the Emirate of Sicily. Later on, Latin-speaking Catholics persecuted the Orthodox Greeks in Eastern Sicily, and Arabic-speaking Catholics persecuted the Orthodox Greeks in Malta.

== Modern ==
=== Albania ===
During the interwar period (1918–1939), the Albanian government closed down many Greek schools as part of its forced assimilation policies.

During the Communist rule in Albania (1944–1992), the Albanian communist government severely restricted the use of the Greek language and Greek names by the country's Greek minority in an attempt at its forced assimilation. During the Greek Civil War, anti-Greek sentiments were alarmingly widespread in the country, especially in the circle of Enver Hoxha, the communist leader of Albania. These negative attitudes towards Greeks continued, at the very least, until 1985, when Hoxha passed away.

In post-Communist Albania, "there are no significant explicitly racist or chauvinist political parties", although, according to James Pettifer, "there are many individual politicians who adhere to very strong anti-Greek views, which in turn affects the orientation of virtually all ethnic Albanian political parties." In a 2013 poll in Albania, Greece topped the list of countries perceived to be a threat to Albania (18.5%), although the plurality of respondents (46.4%) agreed with the statement "No country is a threat to Albania."

=== Australia ===
Greeks in Australia have been subject to discrimination. During World War I, due to King Constantine I's pro-German sympathies, Greek immigrants were viewed with hostility and suspicion. Anti-Greek riots occurred in Sydney in 1915, Perth in 1915, and in Kalgoorlie in 1916.

The word "wog" is an ethnic slur that is often used in Australia to refer to Southern European, North African, and Middle Eastern people of the Mediterranean region, including Greeks. It is also sometimes used against South Asians, Pacific Islanders, and Latin Americans. Additionally, this term has also been adopted and used by Greek Australians to refer to themselves, as well as the sitcom Acropolis Now (1989–1992), the television spin-off of the 1987 play Wogs Out of Work, and the 2000 film The Wog Boy.

=== Bulgaria ===
In 1906, during the Macedonian Struggle, anti-Greek rallies and violent attacks occurred in multiple Bulgarian cities. In Plovdiv, Greek Orthodox churches and schools, Greek-owned properties were looted and plundered. In Pomorie (Anchialos), the Greek population was expelled after the city was set on fire, and up to 110 Greeks were murdered. Pogroms also took place in Varna, Burgas, and several other locations. Following that series of pogroms, around 20,000 Greeks fled or were forcibly expelled from Bulgaria.

=== Canada ===
Between 2 and 5 August 1918, a three-day anti-Greek riot occurred in Toronto. "Mobs of up to 5,000 people, led by war veterans returned from Europe, marched through the city's main streets, waging pitched battles with law enforcement officers and destroying every Greek business they came across." It is estimated that, as a consequence of the riot, approximately $100,000 of damage was caused to Greek businesses and private property.

=== Italy ===
After Benito Mussolini's Blackshirts militia took power in Italy with the March on Rome in October 1922, fascists ruled the country for more than 20 years until Italy's surrender in World War II, in September 1943. Besides launching a nationwide campaign of persecution and oppression of Slavic, Jewish, and Roma people, they also persecuted Italy's Greek speakers.

=== North Macedonia ===
The Macedonia naming dispute gave rise to anti-Greek sentiment in the Republic of Macedonia. According to journalist John Phillips, there was "considerable popular anti-Greek feeling in Macedonia" in 2004. On the contrary, German diplomat Geert-Hinrich Ahrens (ger) wrote in 2007 that he "had never detected any anti-Greek manifestations" in the republic.

One of the main political parties in the country, Internal Macedonian Revolutionary Organization – Democratic Party for Macedonian National Unity (VMRO-DPMNE), founded in 1990, includes the name of Internal Macedonian Revolutionary Organization, a revolutionary movement active in the early 20th century, which is regarded by Greeks as "a notorious anti-Greek terrorist organization." During the party's First Congress, Ljubčo Georgievski, the party's first leader, declared that "the next Congress will convene in Solun" (Thessaloniki in South Slavic languages). According to Dimitar Bechev, a British-based international relations researcher, then Prime Minister of Republic of Macedonia Nikola Gruevski (then also leader of VMRO-DPMNE) exploited "anti-Greek nationalism" during the 2008 parliamentary election. Furthermore, in 2012, Gruevski accused Greece of having waged "political genocide" against his country. Greek Foreign Ministry spokesman Gregory Delavekouras responded that Gruevski's statements "stoke the systematic negative government propaganda that is aimed at turning public opinion in the Former Yugoslav Republic of Macedonia against Greece."

=== Romania ===
At its inception, Romanian national historiography was heavily influenced by romanticism. This led to a reconsideration of the role played by the Phanariotes, who ruled modern day Romania as emissaries of the Ottoman Empire. Romanian national poet Mihai Eminescu described Greeks as "the poison of the Orient, hypocritical people who crave to exploit others." The hellenophobic tendency in Romanian historiography was reversed through the work of historian Nicolae Iorga.

During the course of the Macedonian Struggle, Romania founded the Macedo-Romanian Cultural Society which conducted ethnographic expeditions to Macedonia, Epirus and Thessaly. The Society later took up the role of representing Romania interests in the region. The propagation of Romanian nationalist ideals among the Aromanian communities, created a rift between the two countries known as the Aromanian question. Another important issue was the status of the inheritances of Greeks in Romania. In 1892, Romania refused to hand over the property of the recently deceased Greek expatriate Konstantinos Zappas to the Greek state citing an article of the Romanian constitution forbidding foreign nationals from owning agricultural land. The Trikoupis government then recalled its ambassador in Bucharest, Romania followed suit thus severing diplomatic relations between the countries. Diplomatic relations were restored in July 1896, in response to a rise of Bulgarian komitadji activity in Macedonia. In 1905, the two countries exchanged accusations regarding the Aromanian question. Romania claimed that Greek armed bands targeted ethnic Romanians in Macedonia, whereas Greece accused Romania of trying to create a false equation between Aromanians and Romanians.

Hellenophobic articles began appearing in the Romanian press. On 2 August 1905, the Macedo-Romanian Cultural Society organized an anti-Greek protest in Bucharest, attended by army officers, students and ethnic Aromanians. After decrying Greek war crimes in Macedonia, the organizers called for a boycott of Greek products and services. Rioting was prevented by a large force of Romanian gendarmerie. On the same day a Greek owned cafe in Bucharest was vandalized and its owner beaten. Several days later three editors of the Greek-language newspaper Patris were expelled from the country for sedition. Additionally, on 13 August, protesters set on fire a Greek flag in Giurgiu. An official remonstrance by the Greek ambassador Tombazis was rebutted leading to a mutual withdrawal of embassies on 15 September. In November, the Romanian government allocated funding for the creation of armed Aromanian bands in Macedonia, a parallel motion closed numerous Greek schools in the country. In February 1906, six leading members of the Greek community were expelled from the country, citing their alleged funding of Greek bands in Macedonia. In July 1906, the Greek government officially severed diplomatic relations with Romania. In 1911, Greek prime minister Eleftherios Venizelos used the occasion of the Italo-Turkish War to improve relations with Bulgaria and Romania, restoring diplomatic relations with the latter.

=== Soviet Union ===
Between 1919 and 1924 around 47,000 Greeks emigrated from Russia to Greece as a result of the official and unofficial anti-Greek sentiment in Russia, which in its turn was a result of the Greek intervention in the Black Sea region in the Russian Civil War against the Bolsheviks.

Tens of thousands of Greeks were deported to the remote parts of the Soviet Union during World War II in the Greek Operation of NKVD.

=== Turkey ===
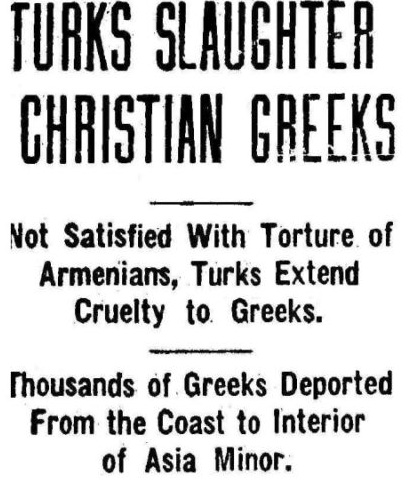
The Lincoln Daily Star, October 19, 1917

Anti-Greek sentiment is "deeply rooted" in the Turkish public. A 2011 survey in Turkey revealed that 67% of respondents had unfavorable views toward Greeks, though only 6% said they saw Greece as their main enemy in a poll carried out that same year. Despite this, according to political scientist Emre Erdogan, Greece remains one of the "eternal enemies of Turkey", along with Armenia. Journalist Dr. Cenk Saraçoğlu of Ankara University argues that anti-Greek attitudes in Turkey "are no longer constructed and shaped by social interactions between the 'ordinary people' [...] Rather, the Turkish media and state promote and disseminate an overtly anti-Greek discourse." On the other hand, Turkish political scientist Bahar Rumelili wrote in 2007:

Both the Turkish government and the Turkish military have made public statements that Turkey no longer sees Greece as its rival. While a small minority in Turkish society maintains its anti-Greek sentiments and actions, there is a growing liking for Greek society and culture and an increasing awareness of the Greek heritage in Turkey.

In 1821, Greeks of Constantinople were massacred in response to the Greek War of Independence, while Patriarch Gregory V of Constantinople was hanged.

During and following World War I, almost all of the Greek population of Anatolia was either exterminated by the Ottoman government or later transferred to Greece as part of a population exchange based on religious affiliation.

In September 1955, the Turkish government sponsored anti-Greek riots and pogrom in Constantinople. The dispute over Cyprus kept anti-Greek feelings in Turkey high. At the height of the intercommunal violence in Cyprus, thousands of Greeks were expelled from Turkey in 1964–1965, mostly Constantinople. In March 1964, all persons (over 6,000) with Greek citizenship were expelled "on the grounds that they were dangerous to the 'internal and external' security of the state." Additionally, in September 1964, 10,000 Greeks were expelled. Cumhuriyet reported that 30,000 "Turkish nationals of Greek descent had left permanently, in addition to the Greeks who had been expelled." Within months a total of 40,000 Greeks were expelled from Constantinople.

In 1999, Turkey "was again swept by a wave of anti-Greek sentiment, encouraged by the Turkish government" following the capture of the Kurdistan Workers' Party leader Abdullah Öcalan in Nairobi, Kenya who was initially hiding in the Greek embassy. However, as a result of the "earthquake diplomacy" and the subsequent rapprochement efforts between Greece and Turkey, the public perception of Greece as their main enemy decreased in Turkey from 29% in 2001 to 16.9% in 2004.

The Grey Wolves, a far-right organization associated with the Nationalist Movement Party (MHP), routinely demonstrate outside the Ecumenical Patriarchate of Constantinople in the Phanar district and burn the Patriarch in effigy. In October 2005, they staged a rally and proceeding to the gate they laid a black wreath, chanting "Patriarch Leave" and "Patriarchate to Greece", inaugurating the campaign for the collection of signatures to oust the Ecumenical Patriarchate from Constantinople. As of 2006, the Grey Wolves claimed to have collected more than 5 million signatures for the withdrawal of the Patriarch and called on the Turkish government to have the patriarch deported to Greece.

=== United States ===
In the early 20th century Greeks in the United States were discriminated against in many ways. In 1904 Greek immigrants, unaware of labor conditions and largely inexperienced, served as strikebreakers during a strike in Chicago diesel shops. This fueled anti-Greek sentiment among union members. Three Greek immigrants were killed during a riot in 1908 in McGill, Nevada. On February 21, 1909, a major anti-Greek riot took place in South Omaha, Nebraska. The Greek population was forced to leave the city, while properties owned by Greek migrants were destroyed. Greeks were viewed with particular contempt in the Mormon stronghold of Utah. The local press characterized them as "a vicious element unfit for citizenship" and as "ignorant, depraved, and brutal foreigners." Anti-Greek riots occurred in Salt Lake City in 1917 which "almost resulted" in lynching of a Greek immigrant. In 1922, as a response to the anti-Greek nativist xenophobia by the Ku Klux Klan (KKK), the American Hellenic Educational Progressive Association (AHEPA) was founded, which sought to Americanize the Greek immigrant in America.

In Montgomery County, Maryland, a suburban county bordering Washington, D.C., some property deeds for houses include discriminatory covenants that excluded Greek-Americans prior to the passage of the Fair Housing Act of 1968.

In December 2014, MTV aired the first episode of its new reality show Growing Up Greek. It was immediately denounced by Greek Americans and characterized as "stereotype-laden" and "offensive". The American Hellenic Educational Progressive Association (AHEPA) called for it to be canceled.

In recent years, anti-Greek sentiment has emerged within neopagan communities through efforts to redefine Hellenism as a modern pagan religion. This usage of either "Hellenismos" or "Hellenism" as a religion and religious identity is considered objectionable and harmful towards Greek identity. In an interview in Tablet magazine, American independent scholar Angelo Nasios explained that: "Hellenism refers simply to Greekness. Recontextualizing it within a religious framework ... can cause confusion for outsiders, and untethers the tradition from its ethnic and historical origins." Nasios is also quoted saying elsewhere that: "Hellenism is not a religious label for Greeks (Hellenes). Rather, it is a word that expresses a multitude of elements that constitute our identity. Hellenism or Hellenismos refers to our entire ethnos and the diaspora."

=== Western Europe ===
As a result of the Greek government-debt crisis, starting in 2010, anti-Greek sentiments grew in some European countries, especially in Germany. A 2014 study found, "An anti-Greek sentiment evolved and spread among German citizens and solidarity for crisis-hit Greece was mostly rejected." In 2012 Pew Research Center found, "Among the major European countries, Greece is clearly the least popular. And its reputation is slipping. In no country, other than Greece itself, is there a majority with a favorable view of Greece." Only 27% of respondents in Germany viewed Greece favorably.

Hostile and unfavorable views towards Greece and Greeks were especially pronounced in the tabloid press. A 2013 study found that Western European news sources "indicate bias against Greece in financial crisis coverage" and "include stereotypes, the recommendation of austerity as a punishment, morality tales, an absence of solidarity, and fear mongering." The popular German tabloid Bild "published numerous reports that implicitly and explicitly constituted the myth of the corrupt and lazy Greeks in comparison to the hard-working Germans." Dutch TV producer Ingeborg Beugel claimed that "the [anti-Greek] propaganda of the mainstream media provides Europe and the Netherlands with a convenient scapegoat to exploit."

German politicians, such as the former Minister for Foreign Affairs Guido Westerwelle and former Chancellor Gerhard Schröder, publicly criticized the anti-Greek sentiment in their country and called for solidarity with Greece.

== Derogatory terms ==
- Grecoman – An insult frequently used in Albania, North Macedonia, Bulgaria, and Romania, meaning "pretending to be a Greek".
- Wog – A derogatory racial term primarily used in Australia and New Zealand against Greeks, but also against other Mediterranean people.
- Greaseball – A racist term used in the United States, targeting Greek and other Mediterranean people.
- Giaour – A slur used in the Ottoman Empire, targeting the people of the Balkans, including Greeks, and in general non-Muslim populations (especially Christians).

== See also ==
- Persecution of Eastern Orthodox Christians
