= Aromanian question =

Divisions within the ethnic identity of Aromanians

The Aromanian question (Aromanian: Chestiuna armãneascã; Greek: Αρωμουνικό ζήτημα, romanized: Aromounikó zítima; Romanian: Chestiunea aromână), also sometimes known as the "Vlach question", refers to the historical and current division of the ethnic identity of the Aromanians, mostly with ones being pro-Greek, pro-Romanian or self-identified purely or primarily as Aromanian.

== History ==
Greek influence is deeply rooted in the Aromanians. They have always been linked to the Greek Ecumenical Patriarchate of Constantinople, which has bounded their cultural and economic activities with the Greek church. Therefore, wealthy urbanized Aromanians had been active promoters of the Greek language for a long time. In the 17th and 18th centuries, this language was used as a lingua franca in various parts of southeastern Europe, and it was necessary to speak it in order to achieve a higher social status or to receive education. Due to the influential position of Greek, not only several Aromanians but also Albanians, Bulgarians and Macedonian Slavs began to declare themselves as ethnic Greeks. Such was the strength of this influence that the first texts in Aromanian, written in the Greek alphabet, promoted the spread of Greek culture. Many settlements in central Greece were easily Hellenized without the need of political or religious movements.

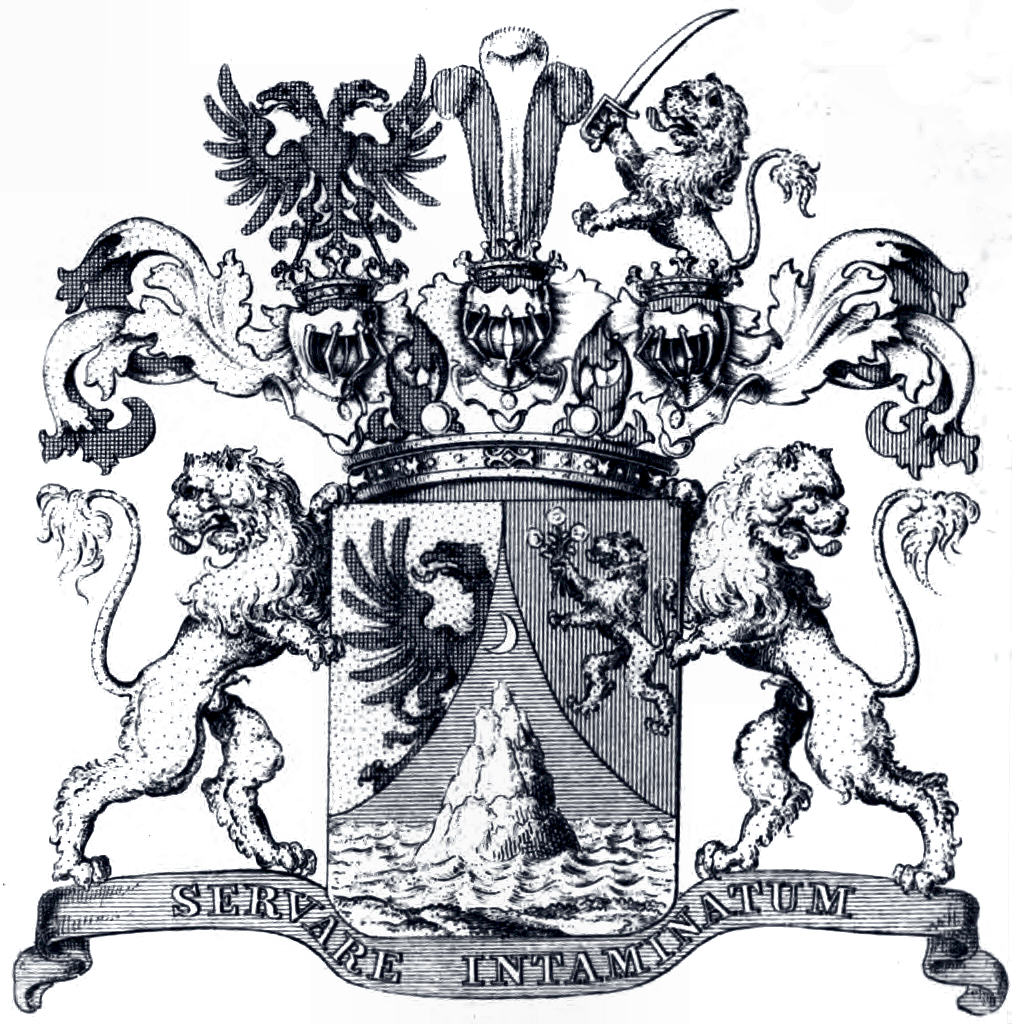
Coat of arms of the Sinas family, of Aromanian descent, which supported the national revival of both Greeks and Romanians

However, the development of an Aromanian identity began to appear in the diaspora. Early Aromanian grammars and language booklets show an awareness of a more "Latin" or "Romance" identity. In 1815, the Aromanians of Buda and Pest asked to use their language as the liturgical one. This national renaissance had similar characteristics with the many other renaissances that occurred during the 19th century. This was strengthened by the emergence and independence of Romania, which began to influence lands still belonging to the Ottoman Empire with propaganda and to initiate educational policies with the Aromanians of Macedonia, Thessaly and Epirus. The first Romanian school in the Balkans was established in Trnovo (now in North Macedonia) in 1864 by Dimitri Atanasescu, and by the early 20th century, there were about 100 Romanian churches and 106 Romanian schools in Macedonia and Epirus. Many Aromanians eventually joined the Romanian movement, which had as its goal the recognition of the Ullah millet ("Vlach Millet", a semi-autonomous "community" for the Aromanians), which happened on 22 May 1905.

The various emerging identities of the Aromanians and the appearance of their national question was due to the strength of the different Balkanic national movements, especially the Greek and Romanian ones, and the continued intervention of external powers in the region. A Greek–Romanian conflict finally erupted during the Macedonian Struggle that led to battles and fights between distinctly oriented Aromanians and the break-up of Greek–Romanian diplomatic relations in 1906. During this time, there were also pro-Bulgarian and pro-Italian Aromanians, but in more reduced numbers. Romanian influence over the Aromanians weakened shortly before World War II. During the European communist regimes, the Aromanian question lost relevance, but after its fall and the minority policies of the European Union, the question has been "reopened".

The Aromanian identity has managed to prevail in modern Slavic states (Bulgaria, North Macedonia and Serbia), as well as in Albania recently and in the Aromanians descended from those who migrated to Romania since 1940, as those who migrated earlier are mostly assimilated. In Greece, there are also areas where the Aromanians have preserved various distinct cultural features, especially in the regions of Grevena, Veria and near Athens. Modern pro-Greek Aromanians often identify with Greek culture and show rejection of the Romanian one, while modern pro-Romanian Aromanians see themselves as part of the Romanian ethnic group with a different dialect of the same language, disassociating themselves from Greek culture. Still, today in Romania, there are Aromanian figures who advocate the separate ethnic nature of the Aromanians from the Romanians, seeking the recognition of the Aromanians as an ethnic minority in the country. These figures are sometimes referred to as "Neo-Aromanians" or "Neo-Aromanianists", defending "Neo-Aromanianism", by opponents of this notion.
