= Podgorci, Struga =

Podgorci Podgorcë
- Village
- Подгорци
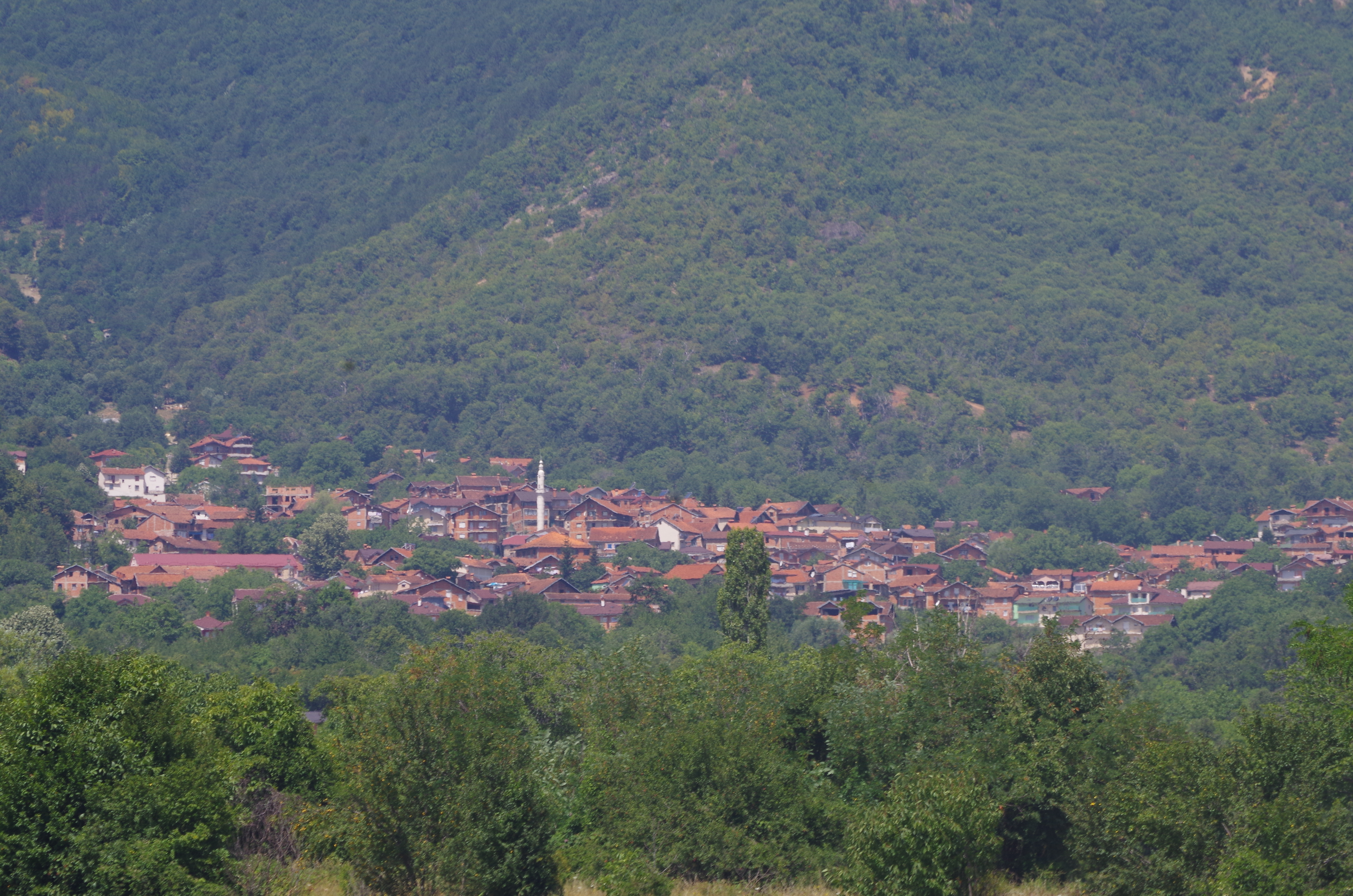
- Panoramic view of the village

- Location within North Macedonia
- Coordinates: 41°15′53″N 20°35′44″E
- Country: North Macedonia
- Region: Southwestern
- Municipality: Struga
- Elevation: 825 m (2,707 ft)

Population (2021)
  - =: 2,430
- Time zone: UTC+1 (CET)
  - Summer (DST): UTC+2 (CEST)
- Area code: +38946 .
- Car plates: SU

Podgorci (Macedonian: Подгорци, Albanian: Podgorcë) is a small village in the municipality of Struga, North Macedonia.

== History ==
The etymology of Podgorci may be the same/ similar to the etymology of Podgorica, the capital city of Montenegro. Podgorica literally means "under the hill". Gorica, a diminutive of the word Gora, which is another word for Mountain or Hill, it means "little/small hill". This Slavic toponym is present throughout the Balkan region.

In 1900, Vasil Kanchov gathered and compiled statistics on demographics in the area and reported that the village of Podgorci was inhabited by about 600 Bulgarian Christians and 550 Bulgarian Muslims.

The "La Macédoine et sa Population Chrétienne" survey by Dimitar Mishev (D. Brankov) concluded that the Christian part of the local population in 1905 was composed of 288 Exarchist Bulgarians and 352 Patriarchist Bulgarians. There were Bulgarian and Serbian schools in the beginning of 20th century

According to the 1943 Albanian census, Podgorci (recorded as "Podgore") was inhabited by 260 Muslim Albanians and 952 Orthodox Bulgarians].

== Demographics ==
Podgorci has been inhabited by Orthodox Christian Macedonians and a Torbeš population.

=== Population ===
As of the 2021 census, Podgorci had 2,430 residents with the following ethnic composition:

- Turks 857
- Others (including Torbeš) 642
- Albanians 583
- Macedonians 243
- Persons for whom data are taken from administrative sources 87
- Bosniaks 18

2002 Population: 2,160

- Macedonians 376
- Albanians 573
- Turks 564
- Vlachs 7
- Serbs 41
- Other 599

=== Languages ===
Languages spoken among the population of Podgorci:

- Macedonian 1995
- Albanian 89
- Turkish 22
- Bosnian 1
- Rest 53
