= Apostol Mărgărit =

Aromanian teacher and writer

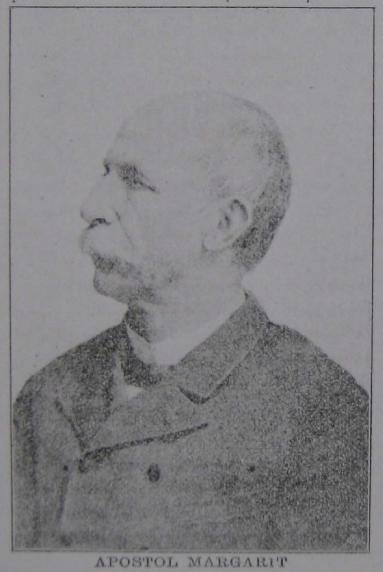
- Born: 5 August 1832; Avdella, Ottoman Empire (modern Greece)
- Died: 19 October 1903 (aged 71); Bitola, Ottoman Empire (modern North Macedonia)
- Occupations: Teaching, writing

Apostol Mărgărit or Apostolos Margaritis (5 August 1832 in Avdella – 19 October 1903 in Bitola) was an Aromanian school teacher and writer. One of the most important voices of Aromanian emancipation in the 19th century, he conditioned Romania's policy toward the Aromanians, who started to have their own schools in their own language, thanks to Mărgărit's efforts.

== Life ==
Mărgărit was born in Macedonia, the Ottoman Empire. In 1862, Mărgărit became a school teacher in Vlaho-Clisura, near Grevena and taught the children in Greek, but also in Aromanian. In 1864, in Trnovo, the first Aromanian school in Macedonia opened its doors for its children. The school was financed by Romania and was supervised by Apostol Mărgărit. It was founded by Dimitri Atanasescu, who was the teacher of the school and a native of the village.

Due to his activity, he was accused of treason by the Greeks, of being either an Austrian or a Catholic agent. There were several assassination attempts on him: he was stabbed with a dagger in Salonika, thrown twice in the Vardar River and shot while in the Ohrid Mountains. He was eventually sent to prison, but managed to escape and settled in Bucharest, where he obtained support from the Romanian monarch.

After the Russo-Turkish War, 1877–1878 and the independence of Romania, the Ottoman government accepted him as school inspector of the Romanian schools on Turkish territory. Under this position, Mărgărit founded many of the Romanian schools of Macedonia and Albania sometimes along with French priest Jean-Claude Faveyrial.

Mărgărit managed to become one of the most important voice of Aromanian emancipation in the Balkans, as he conditioned Bucharest attitude vis-a-vis the Aromanians. For his merits he was made a member of the Romanian Academy on 3 April 1889, and had a national funeral in 1903.

== Works ==
Apart from a number of petitions addressed to the Sublime Porte on behalf of the Aromanian people, he also wrote:

- Réfutation d'une brochure grecque par un Valaque épirote ("Refutation of a Greek brochure by an Epirote Vlach", 1878)
- Etudes historiques sur les Valaques du Pinde ("Historical studies of the Vlachs of Pindus", 1881)
- Les Grecs, les Valaques, les Albanais et l'Empire turc par un Valaque du Pinde ("'The Greeks, Vlachs, and Albanians of the Turkish Empire' by a Vlach from Pindus" 1886)
- La politique grecque en Turquie ("Greek policy in Turkey", 1890)
- Raport despre persecuţiile şcoalelor române în Macedonia din partea Grecilor ("Report on the persecution of Romanian scholars in Macedonia on the part of Greeks", 1875)
- Memoriu privitor la şcoalele de peste Balcani ("Memoirs of the overseer of schools beyond the Balkans", 1887)

== Sources ==
- Dimitrie R Rosetti (1897) Dicţionarul contimporanilor, Editura Lito-Tipografiei "Populara"
- Curierul Naţional, "Omagiu academic pentru Apostol Margarit (1832-1903)"
