= Dimitrios Tsapanos =

Greek chieftain of the Greek Struggle for Macedonia

Kapetan (Chieftain) Dimitrios Tsapanos
- Δημήτριος Τσάπανος
- Born: c. 1882-83; Magarevo, Monastir Vilayet, Ottoman Empire (now Republic of North Macedonia)
- Relatives: Nikolaos Tsapanos
- Military career
- Allegiance: Kingdom of Greece
- Branch: HMC; Hellenic Army
- Conflicts: Macedonian Struggle; Balkan Wars: First Balkan War; Second Balkan War

Dimitrios Tsapanos (Greek: Δημήτριος Τσάπανος) was a Greek chieftain of the Greek Struggle for Macedonia.

== Biography ==
Tsapanos was born in 1882 or 1883 in Magarevo of the historic region of Pelagonia, then Ottoman Empire (now North Macedonia). Nikolaos Tsapanos, chieftain of the 1896–1897 Greek Macedonian rebellion, was his relative. Dimitrios Tsapanos became a kodjabashi of his hometown, Magarevo and a member of the local National Commission.

In 1903 he formed an armed group led by him and took part in the Macedonian Struggle. He acted with his body throughout the Macedonian Struggle against the Bulgarian komitadji armed groups and the Ottoman military extracts who were a threat for the Macedonian Greeks of the region. He protected the Greek populations mainly in the areas of Pelagonia, Prespa, Florina and Pelister. After the Balkan Wars and the incorporation of the region of Pelagonia including his hometown in Kingdom of Serbia, he settled in Florina where he spent the rest of his life, suffering from Ankylosing spondylitis.
