= Romanians in New Zealand =

Românii din Noua Zeelandă (Romanian)

Total population
- 1,437

Regions with significant populations
- Auckland

Languages
- New Zealand English, Romanian

Religion
- Christianity

According to New Zealand’s 2023 Census, 1,437 people identified as Romanian, with the population primarily concentrated in Auckland.

== History ==
In 1946, only 46 Romanians lived in New Zealand. By 1956, that number had risen sharply to 714, mostly because people displaced by Romania’s 1947 Communist takeover had arrived. Some of them were ethnic Greeks from Romania.
