= Michail Sapkas =

Greek politician

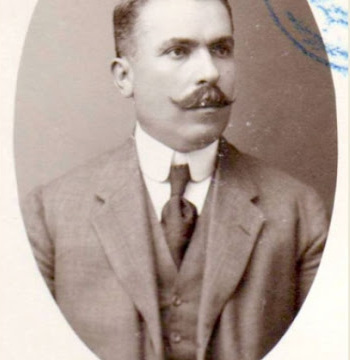
- Michail Sapkas c. 1910s
- Native name: Μιχαήλ Αστέριος Σάπκας
- Born: Michail Asterios Sapkas c. 1867/73; Magarevo, Monastir Vilayet, Ottoman Empire (now Republic of North Macedonia)
- Died: c. 1956 Kingdom of Greece
- Allegiance: Kingdom of Greece
- Branch: HMC
- Conflicts: Macedonian Struggle
- Other work: Member of the New Filiki Etaireia; Member of the Macedonian Society of Larissa; Member of the People's Party; 4 times mayor of Larissa; Twice MP for Larissa

Michail Asterios Sapkas (Greek: Μιχαήλ Αστέριος Σάπκας) was a Greek revolutionary of the Macedonian Struggle and politician.

== Biography ==
Sapkas was born in 1873 in Magarevo, then Ottoman Empire (now North Macedonia). He studied medicine in the University of Athens. Some years before the Macedonian Struggle occurred, he with his family moved to Larissa, where he joined the "New Filiki Eteria" (Νέα Φιλική Εταιρεία) which was established by Anastasios Pichion. He established the Macedonian Society of Larissa, which during the Macedonian Struggle was recruiting volunteers from the nearby areas.

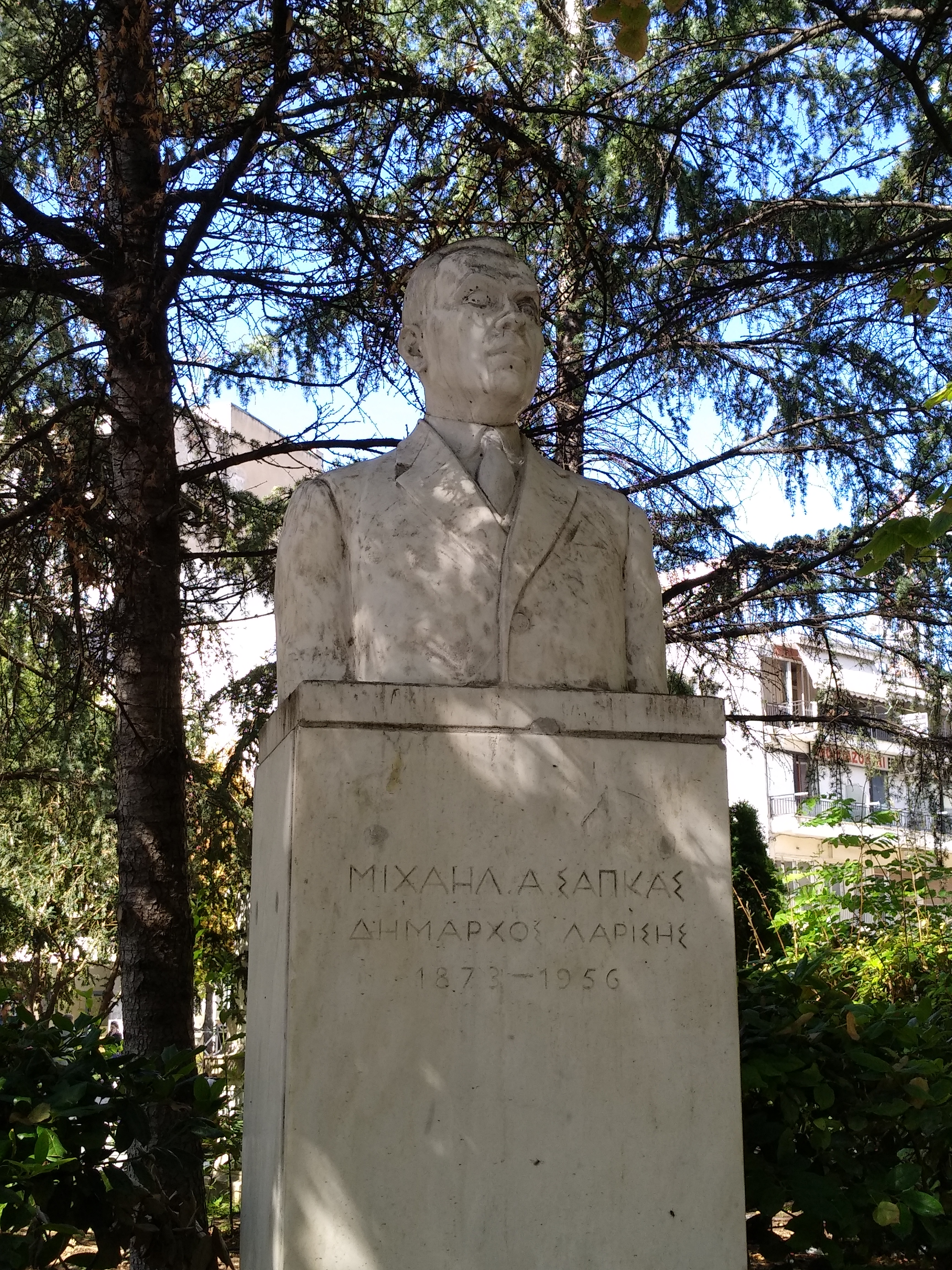
Bust in Larissa

He was elected mayor of Larissa 4 times (1914, 1925, 1929, 1934), and during his service the local water supply and electricity systems got upgraded, as well as the first sidewalks were formed, modern courts of justice were created and the Municipal Conservatory, the Municipal Library and also the Museum of Larissa were founded. Also, during his days, the Senior Gendarmerie Administration of Thessaly was established in Larissa and he granted 15 stremma for the erection of the Alcazar Stadium in 1932. Furthermore, he was elected Member of the Greek Parliament representing Larissa in 1920 and 1936, supporting the People's Party.

He died in 1956, at the age of 83.
