= Aromanian National Day =

National day of the Aromanians

- Observed by: Aromanians; official in North Macedonia
- Type: Ethnic
- Significance: The day of the announcement of the recognition of the Aromanians as a separate ethnolinguistic group in the Ottoman Empire
- Date: 23 May
- Next time: 23 May 2027
- Frequency: annual
- First time: 1991

The Aromanian National Day (Aromanian: Dzua Natsionalã a Armãnjilor) is the national day of the Aromanians, an ethnic group of the Balkans scattered in Albania, Bulgaria, Greece, North Macedonia, Romania and Serbia. It is normally celebrated by Aromanians from various countries in which they are native and also by the Aromanian diaspora, but many Aromanians of Greece do not observe it.

As Aromanian associations and organizations declared in 1991, its day of observation is 23 May, as this was the day in which it was announced that the Sultan of the Ottoman Empire Abdul Hamid II had recognized the Ullah millet ("Vlach millet") for the Aromanians a day earlier on 22 May 1905. This day for the announcement of its recognition may have been chosen because it coincided with the day of the anniversary of the Romanian Declaration of Independence at the time. The creation of the Ullah millet was achieved with the help of Romania and external powers, notably Austria-Hungary and the German Empire, and it granted the Aromanians the right to have their own churches and to have more autonomy over education. Due to the importance of the recognition itself, the holiday is sometimes celebrated on 22 May instead.

On the Aromanian National Day of 2002, the Romanian state secretary Doru Vasile Ionescu announced through a statement at the University of Bucharest that Romania would start supporting again the Aromanian communities of Albania, Bulgaria and North Macedonia. This message read by him was from the Romanian Prime Minister Adrian Năstase. However, when asked about why did the message not include the Aromanians of Greece, Ionescu did not answer the question. This is assumed to represent the desire of the Romanian authorities not to intervene again in the so-called Aromanian question, which had provoked a hostile struggle for influence over the Aromanians by Romania and Greece between the end of the 19th and the start of the 20th centuries.

According to the historian Nikola Minov, the recognition of the Ullah millet was a diplomatic defeat for Greece, which is why pro-Greek Aromanians refuse to celebrate a day that symbolizes a defeat for their perceived "motherland". Another reason may be the fact that the Ullah millet was established by a Turkish Ottoman Sultan, causing his word to not be widely accepted or respected due to the bad relations between Greece and Turkey.

In North Macedonia however, the holiday is known as the "National Day of the Vlachs" (Macedonian: Национален ден на Власите, romanized: Nacionalen den na Vlasite) and it has been congratulated by officials such as the former Macedonian Prime Minister Nikola Gruevski or the former President of North Macedonia Stevo Pendarovski. In fact, it is an official public holiday in North Macedonia since 2007 and a non-working day for Macedonian citizens of Aromanian ethnicity according to a 2007 law issued by the Ministry of Labour and Social Policy of North Macedonia.

Furthermore, in Romania, the Balkan Romanianness Day (Romanian: Ziua Românității Balcanice) was established in 2021 as a holiday in the country to be celebrated every 10 May. This day is also meant to be a holiday for the Aromanians, but also for the Megleno-Romanians and the Istro-Romanians, albeit in the perspective that these three peoples are Romanian subgroups living south of the Danube. In the Balkan Romanianness Day, the establishment of the Ullah millet is also celebrated, but in this case, the date of the holiday is based on the Old Style, as Romania only adopted the Gregorian calendar in 1919. Later in the same year, it was proposed that the Aromanian National Day also be approved as a Romanian holiday celebrated every 23 May. However, the Parliament of Romania rejected this.

== See also ==
- Public holidays in North Macedonia
