= Magarevo =

Magarevo Macedonian: Магарево Aromanian: Magaruva, Mãgãreva
- Village
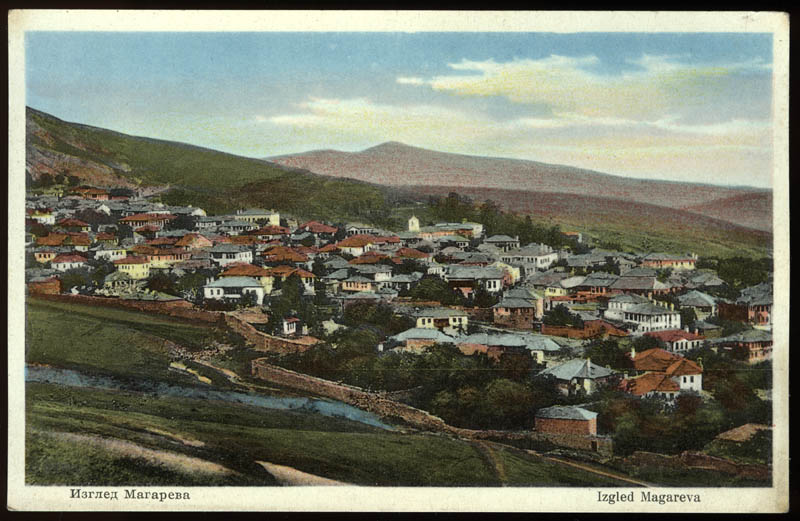

- Location within North Macedonia
- Coordinates: 41°02′N 21°16′E
- Country: North Macedonia
- Region: Pelagonia
- Municipality: Bitola

Population (2021)
  - Total: 81
- Time zone: UTC+1 (CET)
  - Summer (DST): UTC+2 (CEST)
- Car plates: BT
- Website: .

Magarevo (Macedonian: Магарево; Aromanian: Magaruva or Mãgãreva) is a village in the municipality of Bitola, North Macedonia. The village is 8.29 kilometers away from Bitola, which is the second largest city in the country.

== History ==
Magarevo was originally a small village inhabited by a few Orthodox Slavonic families. Aromanians settled in Magarevo in addition to Orthodox Albanian refugees who arrived mainly from Vithkuq, fleeing the 18th century socio-political and economic crises in what is now southern Albania. The Albanian population of Magarevo were Tosks, a subgroup of southern Albanians. Due to intermarriage, the Orthodox Albanian population of Magarevo was assimilated by the larger Aromanian community by the onset of the twentieth century.

During the first World War, Magarevo was occupied by the Bulgarian military who evacuated most of the Aromanian villagers and sent them into the interior of Bulgaria and Bulgarian occupation zone of Serbia. The relocation of local Aromanians was due to Bulgarian forces being concerned that pro-Greek and pro-Serbian sympathies existed among them resulting in possible cooperation with the Entente Allies. While in exile, some villagers had to fend for themselves whereas others for the Bulgarians did forced labour. Some Aromanians returning to Magarevo and neighbouring Trnovo saw the level of destruction caused by war in the villages and around 30 families from both settlements crossed the Mariovo mountains on foot into Greece for Aridaia. The Aromanians hoped that their plight and previous service during the Macedonian Struggle for the Greek cause would be recognised by Greece toward eventually re-establishing themselves in Aridaia.

== Demographics ==
In statistics gathered by Vasil Kanchov in 1900, the village of Magarevo was inhabited by 2,400 Aromanians.

As of the 2021 census, Magarevo had 81 residents with the following ethnic composition:

- Macedonians 60
- Vlachs 16
- Persons for whom data are taken from administrative sources 3
- Others 2

According to the 2002 census, the village had a total of 87 inhabitants. Ethnic groups in the village include:

- Macedonians 62
- Vlachs (Aromanians) 24
- Others 1

== People from Magarevo ==
- Dimitrios Tsapanos, Greek chieftain of the Macedonian Struggle
- Michail Sapkas, Greek revolutionary and politician
- Dimitrios Lalas, Greek composer and musician
