= Party of the Vlachs of Albania =

Aromanian minority political party in Albania

Party of the Vlachs of Albania Albanian: Partia e Vllehëve të Shqipërisë Aromanian: Partia a Rrãmãnjlor dit Arbinishii
- Abbreviation: PVSH
- Chairman: Edmond Petraj
- Founded: 28 October 2011; 15 years ago
- Ideology: Aromanian minority politics Pro-Europeanism
- Political position: Centre-right
- National Assembly: 0 / 140
- Municipality: 0 / 61
- Council Seats: 1 / 1,613

Party flag

The Party of the Vlachs of Albania (PVSH; Albanian: Partia e Vllehëve të Shqipërisë; Aromanian: Partia a Rrãmãnjlor dit Arbinishii), formerly known as the Alliance for Equality and European Justice (Albanian: Aleanca për Barazi dhe Drejtësi Europiane, ABDE; Aromanian: Ligãturea ti Egaliteati shi Ndrept European) is a political party of Albania representing the Aromanian minority of the country.

The party was founded on 28 October 2011 in Durrës by a group of enthusiastic Aromanians led by Valentino Mustaka, the president of the party, and Koçi Janko (Valentino Mustaca and Coci Ianco in Aromanian). Afterwards, the members of the party began a signature collection campaign to fit the requirements of Albanian law that ask for parties to have 3,000 signatures to be legally registered. The party obtained 3,899 signatures in favor of this and submitted a legal registration request that was accepted on 17 February 2012.

Following registration, the party claimed to have been created due to "the objective need of Albanian society to renew the political class" according to "the realities of the 21st century" and to "Albania's European perspective". It also said it would be a centre-right and pro-European political party and that it would form a coalition with the political entity that would win the 2013 Albanian parliamentary election and complained about the situation of education for the Aromanians in Albania, as at the time, there was only one Aromanian school in the whole country. Currently, one of the goals on its political program is the unification of all the Aromanians in Albania.

The foundation of the party raised controversy on Greek media, as it claimed that this "results in them [the Aromanians] being slowly cut off from their connection with the Greek trunk". Other acts of Aromanian emancipation in Albania are also usually seen negatively by some Greek media outlets, which describe the Aromanians as "Latin-speaking Greeks".

In 2021, an electoral coalition known as Alliance National Hour – Emigration – People's Union and Conservatives (AOKBPEK) was registered in Albania. This alliance was formed by the ABDE and 6 other minor political parties in Albania to participate on the 2021 Albanian parliamentary election. On 7 February 2025, lawyer Edmond Petraj was elected unanimously as the party's president after the resignation of Mustaka.

== See also ==
- Democratic Union of the Vlachs of Macedonia, one of the two only Aromanian political parties outside Albania
- Party of the Vlachs of Macedonia, the other of the two Aromanian political parties outside Albania
