= Bashing (pejorative) =

Bashing is a harsh, gratuitous, prejudicial attack on a person, group, or subject. Literally, bashing is a term meaning to hit or assault, but when it is used as a suffix, or in conjunction with a noun indicating the subject being attacked, it is normally used to imply that the act is motivated by bigotry. The term is also used metaphorically, to describe verbal or critical assaults. Topics which attract bashing tend to be highly partisan and personally sensitive topics for the bashers, the victims, or both. Common areas include religion, nationality, sexuality, and politics.

Physical bashing is differentiated from regular assault because it is a motivated assault, which may be considered a hate crime. In relation to non-physical bashing, the term is used to imply that a verbal or critical attack is similarly unacceptable and similarly prejudicial. Use of the term in this manner is an abusive ad hominem action, used to denounce the attack and admonish the attackers by comparing them to perpetrators of physical bashing.

Karen Franklin, in her paper "Psychosocial motivations of hate crimes perpetrators" identifies the following motivations for bashing: socially instilled prejudice or partisan conflict; the perception that the bashing subject is in some way contrary to, or in offense to, an underlying ideology; group or peer influence.

== Physical bashing ==
One of the more common uses of the term bashing is to describe assault or vilification of people perceived to be homosexual. Gay-bashing is related to homophobia and religious objections to homosexuality.

== Non-physical bashing ==
In cases of non-physical bashing, the term is normally used with the intention of having a pejorative effect on the identified bashers by comparing them to perpetrators of criminal assaults. Sometimes this label is applied to criticisms that are not particularly vehement nor even inappropriate. In these cases, the term can be seen to be applied purely for partisan benefit. The use of the term within this context is most common in editorial or personal commentary. These terms are used to imply that the criticism of these groups or individuals is excessive, too frequent, uncompromising, or inappropriate. Since politics is inherently partisan, the term bashing is frequently used to cast negative aspersions on critics for political gain.

Fans of different artistic works often accuse critics, who may be other fans, of bashing the subject or individuals upon which the fandom is centered. A common example of this on the internet is Lucas bashing, where the term is used to decry criticism of Star Wars or George Lucas personally. In this case, again the motivations include partisan conflict (for or against an aspect of an artistic work); an offense to an underlying ideology (nostalgic attachment to, or immersion in, an artistic genre); and the group influence of other fans and discussion forums. There is also character bashing, which happens when a part of the fandom openly criticises one or more characters in an artistic work, or even real people from media industry.

== See also ==
- Gay bashing
- Trans bashing
- Smear campaign
