= Ullah millet =

Ethnolinguistic community recognized in Ottoman law

The Ullah millet (Turkish: Ulah milleti, lit. 'Vlach millet', can be interpreted as "Aromanian nation") was a separate millet (that is, a recognized ethno-religious and linguistic community) within the Ottoman Empire. It was established by the Ottoman authorities for the Aromanians (also known as "Vlachs"; Turkish: Ulahlar) in 1905, during the rise of nationalism in the Ottoman Empire.

== History ==
The Aromanians are a Balkan ethnic group which is scattered in several countries such as Albania, Bulgaria, Greece, North Macedonia, Romania and Serbia. Usually, the neighbors of the Aromanians use the term "Vlach" (Turkish: Ulahlar) to refer to them. However, the same term is also used for the Megleno-Romanians, a small related Balkan people. Before the establishment of the Ullah millet, the Aromanians were under the jurisdiction of the Greek Ecumenical Patriarchate of Constantinople. This was because they practised Eastern Orthodoxy. During this time, most of the priests were Greeks and the Aromanians could not use their own language in church services. This conflict between the Aromanians and Greeks eventually escalated to physical violence, sparking fights between members of both groups. Due to this, the Aromanians started to call for help to the Ottoman authorities and the Romanian Government.

The situation began to be studied by the Ottoman Empire and, on 9 August 1891, the Ministry of Justice sent to the Ottoman grand vizier a report in which it stated that the Aromanians had the right to use their own language in the church just like many Orthodox people in Arab-populated lands could use their mother language if it was not Greek. It also said that the dissatisfaction of the Aromanians could lead them to establish their own independent church. The Aromanian issue had to be treated delicately by the Ottoman authorities. While granting more rights to them could improve relations between Romania and the Ottoman Empire and raise pro-Turkish opinions on its citizens, it could also anger the Ottoman citizens of Bulgarian, Greek and Serb ethnicity. On the other hand, Romania pressured the Ottoman Empire for greater autonomy for the Aromanians and their right for an independent church, even offering a treaty of alliance with them if the ambitions of the Aromanians were fulfilled.

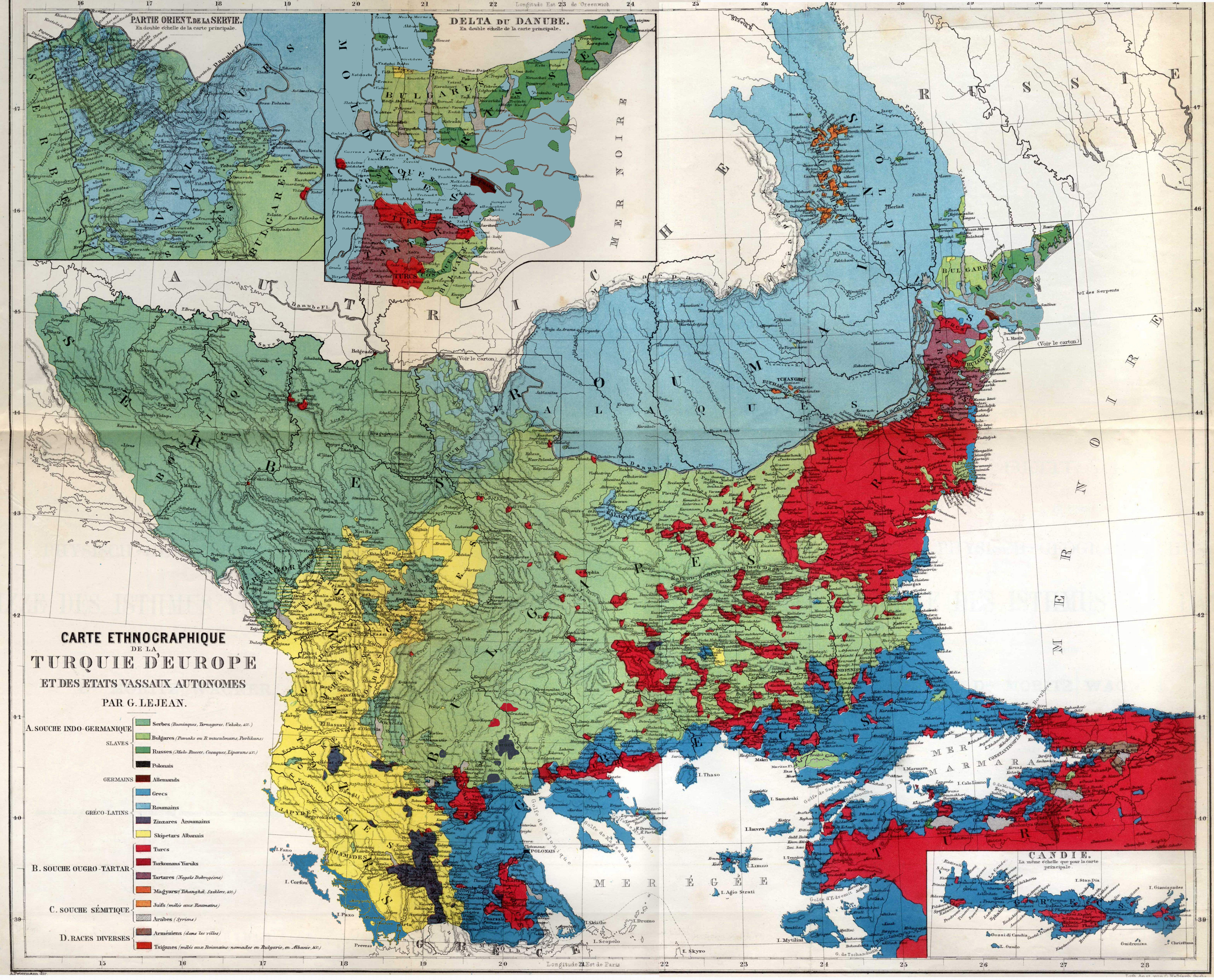
Ethnographic map of the Balkans of 1861 by Guillaume Lejean. The Aromanians are shown in a very dark blue color, surrounded mostly by Albanians (who are represented in yellow; their distribution in this map is inaccurate in the area of Epirus). The Megleno-Romanians are shown as Aromanians.

On 28 June 1904, the Aromanians made a request to the Ottoman authorities. They asked to be separated from the Greeks and to be recognized as a community (a millet) officially and legally in the country. They also asked to have a representative in Istanbul and the right to choose Aromanians in the villages they populated. The Romanian government strongly supported these demands and tried to convince the Ottoman Empire to accomplish them. However, the Sultan of the Ottoman Empire, Abdul Hamid II, decided to ignore these requests to avoid political conflicts. In those times, the Ottoman Empire was specially worried about a possible loss of the region of Macedonia and a change of the status quo in the Balkans. For these reasons, the requests were rejected.

The rejection of their requests by the Ottomans and the Greek opposition of their self-determination sparked the beginning of cooperation between Aromanians and Bulgarians. Bulgarians allowed Aromanian priests to worship in their own language if they joined the Bulgarian Exarchate and some Aromanians started joining Bulgarian local bands. This alarmed the Ottoman authorities, which feared a possible complete alliance between the Bulgarians and the Aromanians. Furthermore, as the Macedonian Struggle intensified in the international scenario, the Aromanian problem took on greater importance. As a result, the German Empire began to support them in their quest for rights. After Abdul Hamid II learned of the demands that Germany was making on behalf of the Aromanians, he turned towards the Sublime Porte to seek a solution to the Aromanian issue.

Thus, on 22 May 1905, Sultan Abdul Hamid II issued an irâde-i seniyye ("spoken will") in which he granted the Aromanians all rights proper of a millet with the exception of a religious head, therefore creating the Ullah millet. In this decree, the Aromanians were not granted a separate church, but they were given the right to perform religious services in Aromanian and to choose their own mayors in their villages. The following day, the Sultan's decision was publicly announced. The news was happily received in Romania, in which the establishment of the Ullah millet was seen as a great victory. However, the decision met a strong Greek opposition, leading to the killing of Aromanian clergymen and violence against the attendants of Aromanian schools by Greek bands. This caused a diplomatic crisis between Greece and Romania.

Although they did not obtain their independent church, the Aromanians were satisfied with the new situation. However, they had problems exercising their new rights in some conflictive or multiethnic areas. In the end, after the Balkan Wars, the Ottoman Empire lost the lands where the Aromanians lived. This caused the Aromanians to lose their minority rights and made them an ethnic group scattered in various countries, making the fight for the survival of the Aromanian ethnicity, language and culture more difficult.

== Legacy ==
The establishment of the Ullah millet is symbolic for the Aromanians and is commemorated by many of them in the Aromanian National Day every 22 or 23 May. Nevertheless, many of those Aromanians in Greece who are still loyal to the country usually reject the holiday as it is perceived as symbolizing a defeat for their perceived "motherland". This is because the recognition of the Ullah millet was regarded as a diplomatic defeat for Greece at the time.

The Ullah millet is also observed in Romania through the Balkan Romanianness Day. This holiday is meant for the Aromanians but also for the Megleno-Romanians and the Istro-Romanians, perceived in Romania simply as ethnic Romanian subgroups living south of the Danube. Unlike the Aromanian National Day, the Balkan Romanianness Day is celebrated every 10 May as Romania only adopted the Gregorian calendar in 1919. Additionally, attempts to officialize the Aromanian National Day in Romania have been rejected.

== See also ==
- Armenian Millet
- Bulgarian Millet
- Rum Millet
- Vlach law
