= Trnovo, Bitola =

Trnovo Трново Tërovë Tãrnuva or Tãrnova
- Village
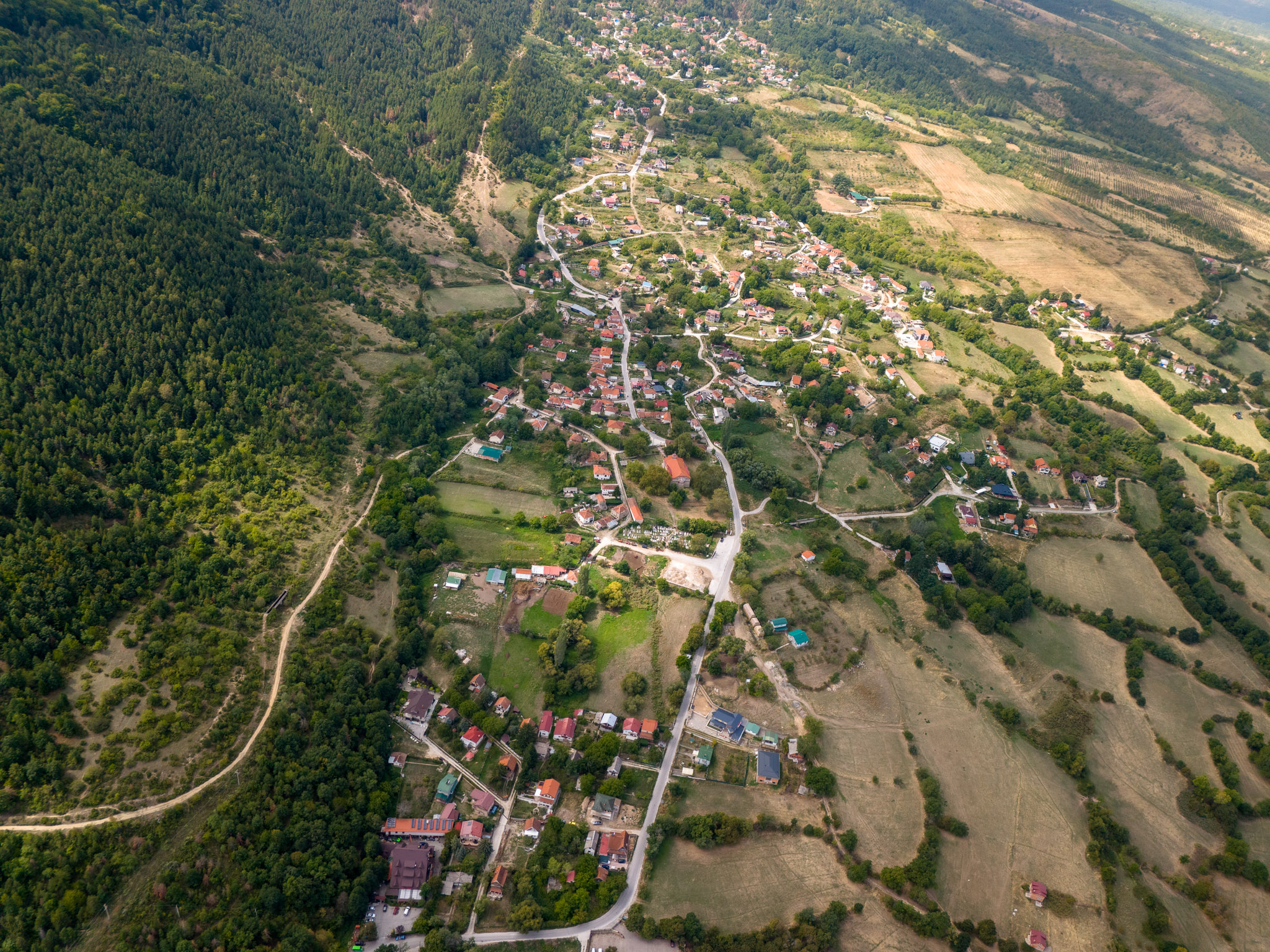
- View of the village

- Location within North Macedonia
- Coordinates: 41°02′N 21°16′E
- Country: North Macedonia
- Region: Pelagonia
- Municipality: Bitola

Population (2002)
  - Total: 278
- Time zone: UTC+1 (CET)
  - Summer (DST): UTC+2 (CEST)
- Car plates: BT
- Website: .

Trnovo (Macedonian: Трново; Albanian: Tërovë; Aromanian: Tãrnuva or Tãrnova) is a village in the municipality of Bitola, North Macedonia. The village is 7.53 kilometers away from Bitola, which is the second largest city in the country. The village is home to at least one bunker, believed to be a Yugoslav-era military bunker, located on the mountainside near the football pitch. The village has two cemeteries, one traditionally used by the Orthodox Macedonian community, located near the main entrance to the village beside the church, and another used by the Muslim Albanian community, situated toward the rear of the village.

== History ==
Aromanians settled in Trnovo in addition to Orthodox Albanian refugees who arrived mainly from Vithkuq, fleeing the 18th century socio-political and economic crises in what is now southern Albania. These Albanians spoke Albanian in the Tosk dialect of the language. Due to intermarriage, the Orthodox Albanian population of Trnovo was assimilated by the larger Aromanian community at the onset of the twentieth century. A small number of Muslim Albanians over time settled in Trnovo originating from the Korçë region. In 1864, in Trnovo, the first Aromanian school in Macedonia opened its doors for its children. The school was financed by Romania and was supervised by Apostol Mărgărit. It was founded by Dimitri Atanasescu, who was the teacher of the school and a native of the village.

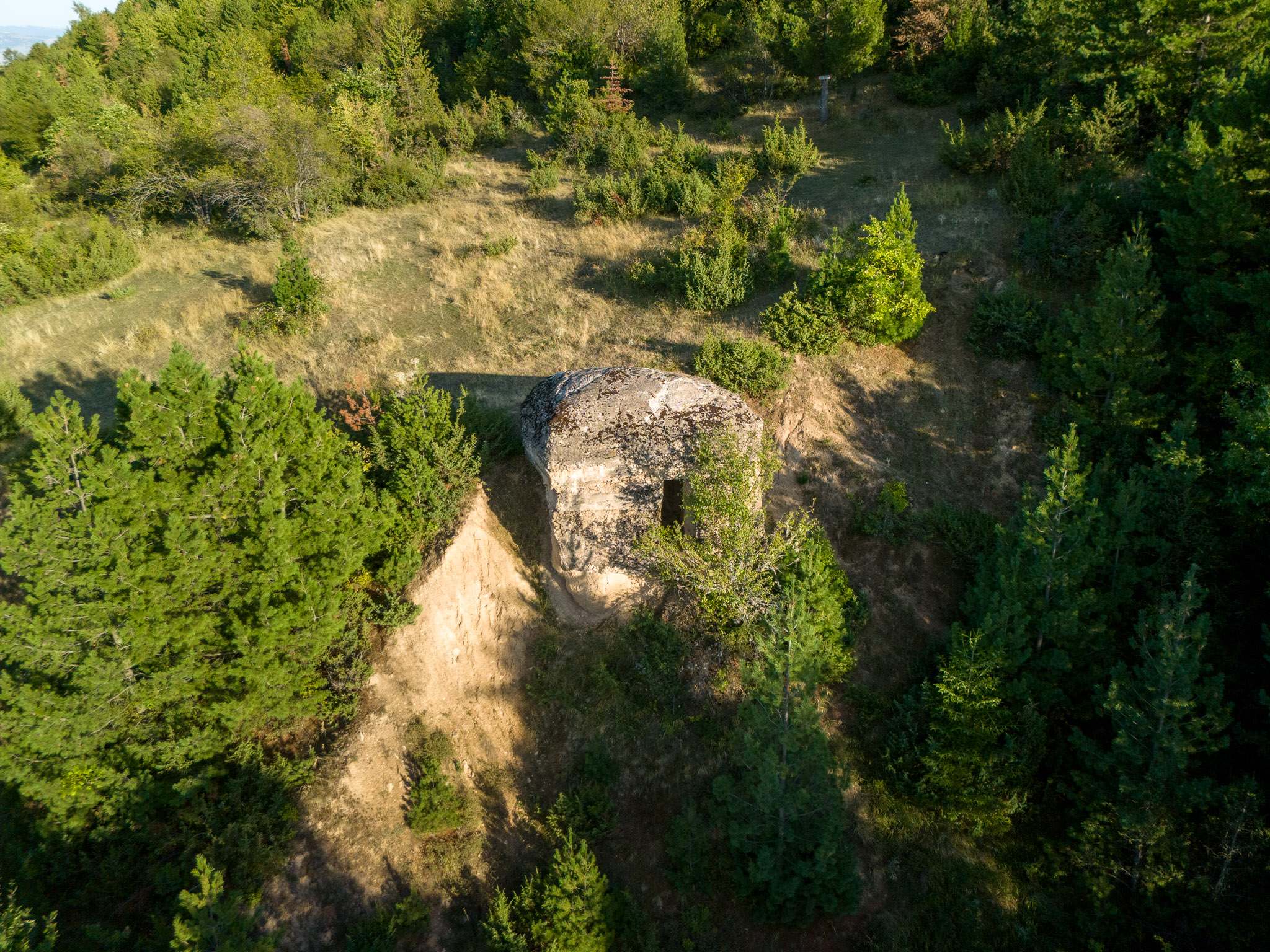
Aerial photograph of a bunker in Tërovë (Trnovo), 2025

During the first World War, Trnovo was occupied by the Bulgarian military who evacuated most of the Aromanian villagers and sent them into the interior of Bulgaria and Serbia. The relocation of local Aromanians was due to Bulgarian forces being concerned that pro-Greek and pro-Serbian sympathies existed among them resulting in possible cooperation with the Entente Allies. While in exile, some villagers had to fend for themselves whereas others for the Bulgarians did forced labour. Some Aromanians returning to Trnovo and neighbouring Magarevo saw the level of destruction caused by war in the villages and around 30 families from both settlements crossed the Mariovo mountains on foot into Greece for Aridaia. The Aromanians hoped that their plight and previous service during the Macedonian Struggle for the Greek cause would be recognised by Greece toward eventually re-establishing themselves in Aridaia.

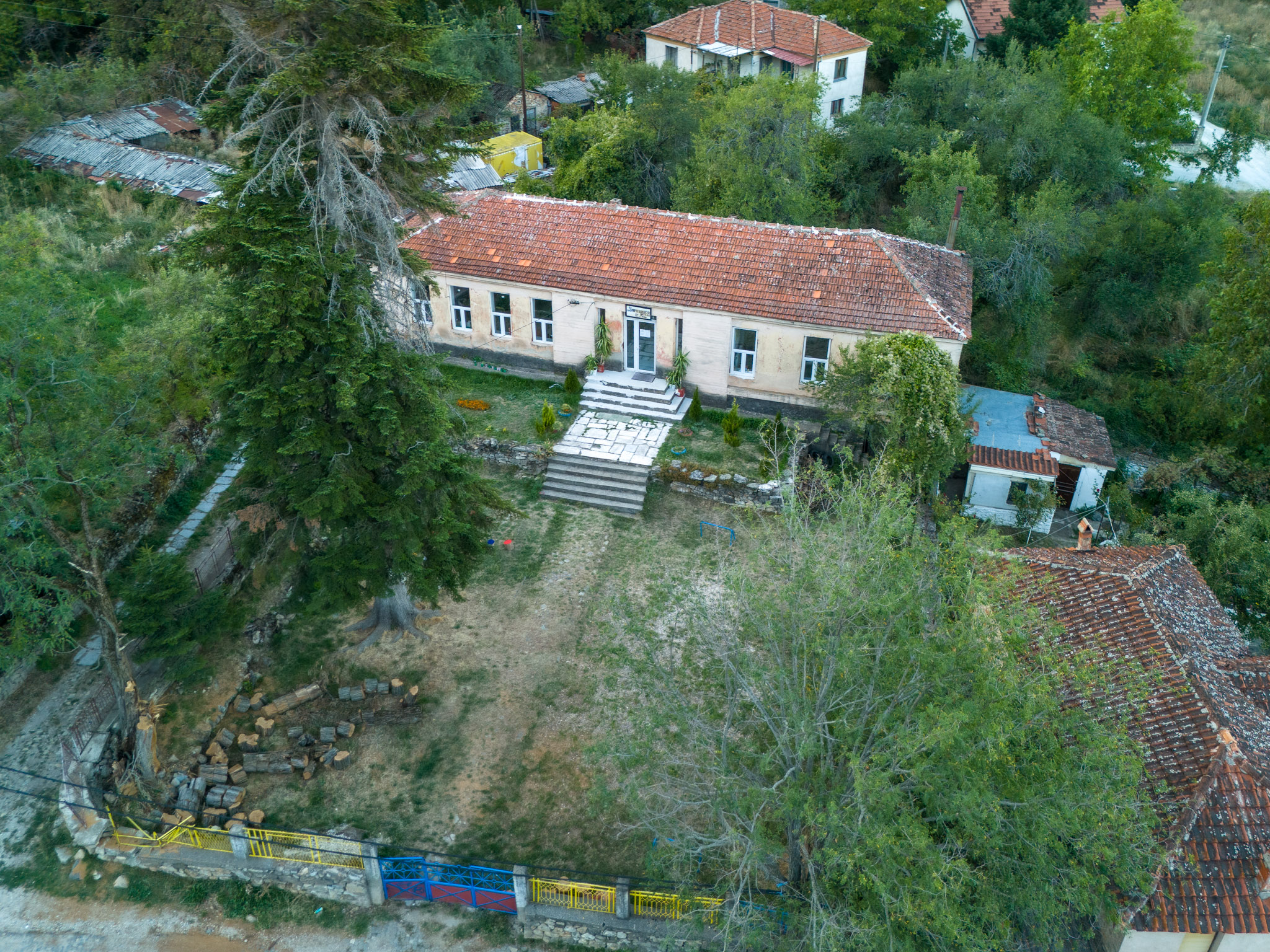
Aerial view of a school in Tërovë (Trnovo), Manastir (Bitola), 2025

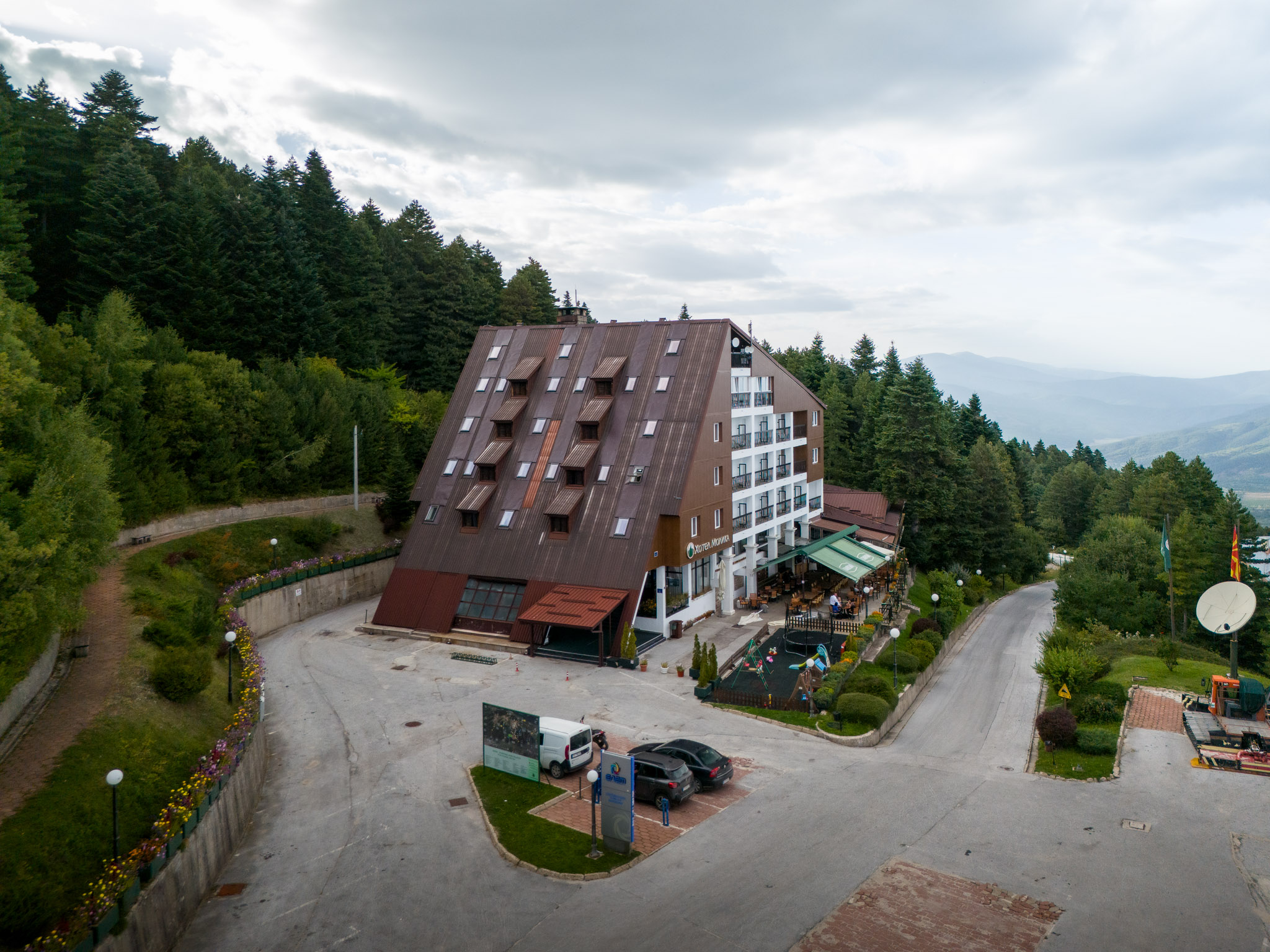
Aerial view of Hotel Molika near the summit of Pelister National Park and its ski area, with vehicles passing through Tërovë (Trnovo) en route in 2025.

== Demographics ==
In statistics gathered by Vasil Kanchov in 1900, the village of Trnovo was inhabited by 2,400 Aromanians and 50 Muslim Albanians.

According to the 2002 census, the village had a total of 278 inhabitants. Ethnic groups in the village include:

- Macedonians 146
- Albanians 82
- Vlachs (Aromanians) 48
- Serbs 1
- Others 1

== Notable people ==
- Dimitri Atanasescu
