= Dimitri Atanasescu =

Aromanian teacher at the first Romanian school in the Balkans

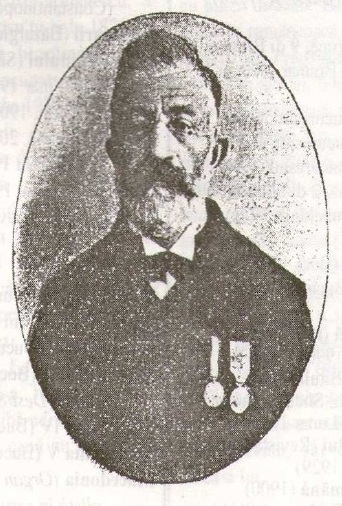
- Image of Atanasescu
- Born: Dimitri Atanasescu Hagi Sterjio; 16 May 1836; Trnovo, Ottoman Empire (now North Macedonia)
- Died: 1907 (aged 70–71); Bucharest, Romania
- Occupation: Teacher
- Known for: Being the teacher of the first Romanian school in the Balkans

Dimitri Atanasescu Hagi Sterjio (Romanian: Dimitrie Atanasescu Hagi Steriu; 16 May 1836 – 1907) was an Aromanian tailor and later teacher known for having been the teacher of the first Romanian school in the Balkans for the Aromanians, located at Trnovo (Tãrnuva or Tãrnova), the place where he was born, which was then part of the Ottoman Empire.

== Biography ==
In 1859, the principalities of Moldavia and Wallachia united and formed modern Romania. This represented one of the first steps of the accomplishment of the Romanian national idea, which allowed Romanian intellectuals to shift their focus to other perceived issues. One of these was the Aromanians, then viewed in Romania as "Romanians of the Balkans". Mobilization was called upon the Aromanians then residing in the new country and an Aromanian committee was established in Bucharest thanks to the efforts of Dimitrie Cozacovici, an important figure of the early Aromanian national movement.

This committee would issue several manifestos throughout the Balkans, then mostly part of the Ottoman Empire. Atanasescu, then 25 years old, was an Aromanian tailor from the village of Trnovo (Tãrnuva or Tãrnova) who was in a coffeehouse in Istanbul when he stumbled across one of the committee's manifestos. He would go to Bucharest on 20 July 1861 and begin his studies there with the aim of returning to his village and establishing a Romanian school in Trnovo, one of the main objectives of the committee being the creation of Romanian schools in the Balkans for the Aromanians.

About 3 years later, Atanasescu, who had not even finished his studies yet, asked for financial support from the Romanian authorities, receiving a positive response from the Minister of Foreign Affairs, Cults and Public Instruction Dimitrie Bolintineanu. Thus, on 2 July 1864, the first Romanian school in the Balkans for the Aromanians was established by Atanasescu. However, some Greek nationalist and ecclesiastical figures saw this with bad eyes and began to persecute Atanasescu. In November of the same year, the Archbishop Benedict of Pelagonia arrested him and confiscated 1,000 of his Romanian manuals. Atanasescu was released shortly after and returned to Bucharest in 1865. To this the Romanian authorities responded by intensifying their support for Romanian schools for the Aromanians.

As a consequence of these measures, at the beginning of the 20th century, there were up to 106 Romanian schools in the region of Macedonia with 300 teachers and 4,000 students. These schools taught their initial classes in Aromanian, but later switched to Romanian for the more advanced ones. Many of the people who participated in this movement of establishing Romanian schools for Aromanians were ethnic Aromanians themselves, and not only Romanians.

== See also ==
- Aromanians in Romania
