= April 10 =

April 10 this year in various calendars
- Friday, 10 April 2026
Akan	Monofie
Armenian	24 Ahekani 1475
Aztec	Tlaxochimaco 10, 13 Tecpatl
Babylonian	21 Adaru, 2336 SE
Balinese pawukon	Luang, Pepet, Kajeng, Laba, Paing, Maulu, Sukra of Sinta, Brahma, Gigis, Manuh
Bengali	27 Chaitro, BS 1432
Chinese	Yang Wood Tiger・Ox Mansion; Fire Horse Year, Month 2, Day 23 (Qingming, 10 days until Guyu)
Common Era	10 April 2026 CE
Coptic	2 Parmouti, AM 1742
Egyptian	29 Mesori, 2774 NE
Ethiopian	2 Miyāzyā, 2018 Amätä Məhrät
French Republican	Décade III, Primidi de Germinal de l'Année 234 de la République
Gregorian	10 April, AD 2026
Hebrew	23 Nisan, AM 5786; Omer 8
Hindu	Pūrvāṣāḍha・Śiva; Solar: 28 Caitra, 1947 SE; Lunisolar: Aṣṭamī, Kṛishna pakṣa of Caitra, 2083 VE; Rāudra・5126 KY・1,872,675
Icelandic	Föstudagur, 18 Einmánuður 2025
Islamic	22 Shawwal, AH 1447 (using tabular method)
ISO week date	2026-W15-5
Japanese	23 Kisaragi, Reiwa 8 (Seimei, 10 days until Kokuu)
Julian	28 March, AD 2026 (AM 7534)
Julian day	2461141
Korean	23 Tokkidal, 4359 DE
Maya	13.0.13.8.18; 11 Pop, 13 Etznab
Roman	ante diem V Kalendas Apriles, MMDCCLXXIX AUC
Solar Hijri	21 Farvardin, SH 1405
Tibetan	23 dbo, me pho rta 2153 or 1772 or 1000

<<	April					>>
Su	Mo	Tu	We	Th	Fr	Sa
			1	2	3	4
5	6	7	8	9	10	11
12	13	14	15	16	17	18
19	20	21	22	23	24	25
26	27	28	29	30
2026

April 10 in recent years
2026 (Friday)
2025 (Thursday)
2024 (Wednesday)
2023 (Monday)
2022 (Sunday)
2021 (Saturday)
2020 (Friday)
2019 (Wednesday)
2018 (Tuesday)
2017 (Monday)

April 10 is the 100th day of the year (101st in leap years) in the Gregorian calendar; 265 days remain until the end of the year.

== Events ==
=== Pre-1600 ===
- 238 – During the year of Six Emperors, forces of Gordian I and Gordian II are defeated by those of Maximinus Thrax in the battle of Carthage.
- 428 – Nestorius becomes the Patriarch of Constantinople.
- 837 – Halley's Comet makes its closest approach to Earth at a distance equal to 0.0342 AU (5.1 million kilometres/3.2 million miles).
- 847 – Election of Pope Leo IV following the death of Pope Sergius II.
- 1407 – Deshin Shekpa, 5th Karmapa Lama visits the Ming dynasty capital at Nanjing and is awarded the title "Great Treasure Prince of Dharma".
- 1500 – Ludovico Sforza is captured by Swiss troops at Novara and is handed over to the French.
- 1545 – The settlement of Villa Imperial de Carlos V (now the city of Potosí) in Bolivia is founded after the discovery of huge silver deposits in the area.

=== 1601–1900 ===
- 1606 – The Virginia Company of London is established by royal charter by James I of England with the purpose of establishing colonial settlements in North America.
- 1710 – The Statute of Anne, the first law regulating copyright, comes into force in Great Britain.
- 1717 – Robert Walpole resigns from the British government, commencing the Whig Split which lasts until 1720.
- 1724 – Bach leads the first performance of his cantata Erfreut euch, ihr Herzen, BWV 66, his first cantata composed for Easter in Leipzig.
- 1741 – War of the Austrian Succession: Prussia gains control of Silesia at the Battle of Mollwitz.
- 1796 – War of the First Coalition: A surprise Austrian attack at the Battle of Voltri marks the beginning of the Italian Campaign, the decisive campaign under Napoleon Bonaparte that will end the war a year later.
- 1809 – Napoleonic Wars: The War of the Fifth Coalition begins when forces of the Austrian Empire invade Bavaria.
- 1814 – Allied forces under the Duke of Wellington attack Toulouse held by Marshall Soult, driving out the French after fierce fighting.
- 1815 – The Mount Tambora volcano begins a three-month-long eruption, lasting until July 15. The eruption ultimately kills 71,000 people and affects Earth's climate for the next two years.
- 1816 – The Federal government of the United States approves the creation of the Second Bank of the United States.
- 1821 – Patriarch Gregory V of Constantinople is hanged by the Ottoman government from the main gate of the Patriarchate and his body is thrown into the Bosphorus.
- 1821 – Greek War of Independence: the island of Psara joins the Greek struggle for independence.
- 1826 – The 10,500 inhabitants of the Greek town of Missolonghi begin leaving the town after a year's siege by Turkish forces. Very few of them survive.
- 1858 – After the original Big Ben, a 14.5 tonnes (32,000 lb) bell for the Palace of Westminster, had cracked during testing, it is recast into the current 13.76 tonnes (30,300 lb) bell by Whitechapel Bell Foundry.
- 1864 – Archduke Maximilian of Habsburg is proclaimed emperor of Mexico during the French intervention in Mexico.
- 1865 – American Civil War: A day after his surrender to Union forces, Confederate General Robert E. Lee addresses his troops for the last time.
- 1866 – The American Society for the Prevention of Cruelty to Animals (ASPCA) is founded in New York City by Henry Bergh.
- 1868 – At Arogee in Abyssinia, British and Indian forces defeat an army of Emperor Tewodros II. While 700 Ethiopians are killed and many more injured, only two British/Indian troops die.
- 1872 – The first Arbor Day is celebrated in Nebraska.
- 1887 – On Easter Sunday, Pope Leo XIII authorizes the establishment of the Catholic University of America.
- 1896 – Summer Olympics: The Olympic marathon is run ending with the victory of Greek athlete Spyridon Louis.
- 1900 – British suffer a sharp defeat by the Boers south of Brandfort. Six hundred British troops are killed and wounded and 800 taken prisoner.

=== 1901–present ===
- 1912 – RMS Titanic sets sail from Southampton, UK, on her maiden and only voyage.
- 1919 – Mexican Revolution leader Emiliano Zapata is ambushed and shot dead by government forces in Morelos.
- 1919 – The Third Regional Congress of Peasants, Workers and Insurgents is held by the Makhnovshchina at Huliaipole.
- 1925 – The Russian city of Tsaritsyn is renamed Stalingrad to honor the Soviet leader Joseph Stalin, Soviet Communist Party General Secretary, who had guided the defense of Tsaritsyn during the Russian Civil War in 1920.
- 1941 – World War II: The Axis powers establish the Independent State of Croatia.
- 1944 – Rudolf Vrba and Alfréd Wetzler escape from Birkenau death camp.
- 1963 – One hundred twenty-nine American sailors die when the submarine USS Thresher sinks at sea.
- 1968 – The TEV Wahine, a New Zealand ferry, sinks in Wellington harbour due to a fierce storm – the strongest winds ever in Wellington. Out of the 734 people on board, fifty-three died.
- 1970 – Paul McCartney announces that he is leaving The Beatles for personal and professional reasons.
- 1972 – Tombs containing bamboo slips, among them Sun Tzu's Art of War and Sun Bin's lost military treatise, are discovered by construction workers in Shandong.
- 1972 – Vietnam War: For the first time since November 1967, American B-52 bombers reportedly begin bombing North Vietnam.
- 1973 – Invicta International Airlines Flight 435 crashes in a snowstorm on approach to Basel, Switzerland, killing 108 people.
- 1979 – Red River Valley tornado outbreak: A tornado lands in Wichita Falls, Texas, killing 42 people.
- 1981 – Imprisoned IRA hunger striker Bobby Sands is elected to Westminster as the MP for Fermanagh and South Tyrone, Northern Ireland. He died twenty-six days later.
- 1988 – The Ojhri Camp explosion kills or injures more than 1,000 people in Rawalpindi and Islamabad, Pakistan.
- 1991 – Italian ferry MS Moby Prince collides with an oil tanker in dense fog off Livorno, Italy, killing 140.
- 1991 – A rare tropical storm develops in the South Atlantic Ocean near Angola, the first to be documented by satellites.
- 1998 – The Good Friday Agreement is signed in Northern Ireland.
- 2009 – President of Fiji Ratu Josefa Iloilo announces the abrogation of the constitution and assumes all governance in the country, creating a constitutional crisis.
- 2010 – Polish Air Force Tu-154M crashes near Smolensk, Russia, killing 96 people, including Polish President Lech Kaczyński, his wife, and dozens of other senior officials and dignitaries.
- 2016 – The Paravur temple accident, in which a devastating fire caused by the explosion of firecrackers stored for Vishu kills more than one hundred people out of the thousands gathered for the seventh day of Bhadrakali worship.
- 2016 – An earthquake of 6.6 magnitude strikes 39 km west-southwest of Ashkasham, impacting India, Afghanistan, Tajikistan, Srinagar and Pakistan.
- 2023 – A mass shooting occurs at the Old National Bank in Louisville, Kentucky, that leaves five victims dead and eight wounded.

== Births ==
=== Pre-1600 ===
- 401 – Theodosius II, Roman emperor (died 450)
- 1018 – Nizam al-Mulk, Persian scholar and vizier (died 1092)
- 1472 – Margaret of York, English princess (died 1472)
- 1480 – Philibert II, duke of Savoy (died 1504)
- 1487 – William I, count of Nassau-Siegen (died 1559)
- 1512 – James V, king of Scotland (died 1542)
- 1583 – Hugo Grotius, Dutch philosopher and jurist (died 1645)

=== 1601–1900 ===
- 1651 – Ehrenfried Walther von Tschirnhaus, German mathematician, physicist and medical doctor (died 1708)
- 1656 – René Lepage de Sainte-Claire, French-Canadian settler, founded Rimouski (died 1718)
- 1704 – Benjamin Heath, English scholar and author (died 1766)
- 1707 – Michel Corrette, French organist, composer, and author (died 1795)
- 1713 – John Whitehurst, English geologist and clockmaker (died 1788)
- 1755 – Samuel Hahnemann, German-French medical doctor and academic (died 1843)
- 1762 – Giovanni Aldini, Italian physicist and academic (died 1834)
- 1769 – Jean Lannes, French marshal (died 1809)
- 1778 – William Hazlitt, English essayist and critic (died 1830)
- 1794 – Matthew C. Perry, English-Scottish American commander (died 1858)
- 1806 – Juliette Drouet, French actress (died 1883)
- 1806 – Leonidas Polk, Scottish-American general and bishop (died 1884)
- 1827 – Lew Wallace, American general, lawyer, author and politician, 11th Governor of New Mexico Territory (died 1905)
- 1829 – William Booth, English minister, founded The Salvation Army (died 1912)
- 1847 – Joseph Pulitzer, Hungarian-American journalist, publisher, and politician, founded Pulitzer, Inc. (died 1911)
- 1864 – Eugen d'Albert, Scottish-German pianist and composer (died 1932)
- 1865 – Jack Miner, American-Canadian farmer, hunter, and environmentalist (died 1944)
- 1867 – George William Russell, Irish author, poet, and painter (died 1935)
- 1868 – George Arliss, English actor and playwright (died 1946)
- 1868 – Asriel Günzig, Moravian rabbi (died 1931)
- 1873 – Kyösti Kallio, Finnish farmer, banker, and politician, 4th President of Finland (died 1940)
- 1875 – George Clawley, English footballer (died 1920)
- 1877 – Alfred Kubin, Austrian author and illustrator (died 1959)
- 1879 – Coenraad Hiebendaal, Dutch rower and medical doctor (died 1921)
- 1880 – Frances Perkins, American sociologist, academic, and politician, United States Secretary of Labor (died 1965)
- 1880 – Montague Summers, English clergyman and author (died 1948)
- 1886 – Johnny Hayes, American runner and trainer (died 1965)
- 1887 – Bernardo Houssay, Argentinian physiologist and academic, Nobel Prize laureate (died 1971)
- 1889 – Louis Rougier, French philosopher from the Vienna Circle (died 1982)
- 1891 – Frank Barson, English footballer and coach (died 1968)
- 1893 – Otto Steinböck, Austrian zoologist (died 1969)
- 1894 – Ben Nicholson, British painter (died 1982)
- 1897 – Prafulla Chandra Sen, Indian accountant and politician, 3rd Chief Minister of West Bengal (died 1990)
- 1900 – Arnold Orville Beckman, American chemist, inventor, and philanthropist (died 2004)

=== 1901–present ===
- 1901 – Dhananjay Ramchandra Gadgil, Indian economist (died 1971)
- 1903 – Patroklos Karantinos, Greek architect (died 1976)
- 1903 – Clare Turlay Newberry, American author and illustrator (died 1970)
- 1906 – Steve Anderson, American hurdler (died 1988)
- 1910 – Margaret Clapp, American scholar and academic (died 1974)
- 1910 – Helenio Herrera, Argentinian footballer and manager (died 1997)
- 1911 – Martin Denny, American pianist and composer (died 2005)
- 1911 – Maurice Schumann, French journalist and politician, Minister of Foreign and European Affairs for France (died 1998)
- 1912 – Boris Kidrič, Austrian-Slovenian politician, 1st Prime Minister of Slovenia (died 1953)
- 1913 – Stefan Heym, German-American soldier and author (died 2001)
- 1914 – Jack Badcock, Australian cricketer (died 1982)
- 1915 – Harry Morgan, American actor and director (died 2011)
- 1915 – Leo Vroman, Dutch-American hematologist, poet, and illustrator (died 2014)
- 1916 – Wendy Barnes, British overseas radio broadcaster (died 2006)
- 1916 – Lee Jung-seob, Korean painter (died 1956)
- 1917 – Jagjit Singh Lyallpuri, Indian politician (died 2013)
- 1917 – Robert Burns Woodward, American chemist and academic, Nobel Prize laureate (died 1979)
- 1919 – John Houbolt, American engineer and academic (died 2014)
- 1921 – Chuck Connors, American baseball player and actor (died 1992)
- 1921 – Jake Warren, Canadian soldier and diplomat, Canadian Ambassador to the United States (died 2008)
- 1921 – Sheb Wooley, American singer-songwriter and actor (died 2003)
- 1923 – Roger Gaillard, Haitian historian and author (died 2000)
- 1923 – Jane Kean, American actress and singer (died 2013)
- 1923 – Floyd Simmons, American decathlete and actor (died 2008)
- 1923 – Sid Tickridge, English footballer (died 1997)
- 1923 – John Watkins, South African cricketer (died 2021)
- 1924 – Kenneth Noland, American soldier and painter (died 2010)
- 1925 – Angelo Poffo, American wrestler and promoter (died 2010)
- 1926 – Jacques Castérède, French pianist and composer (died 2014)
- 1926 – Junior Samples, American comedian (died 1983)
- 1927 – Norma Candal, Puerto Rican actress (died 2006)
- 1927 – Marshall Warren Nirenberg, American biochemist and geneticist, Nobel Prize laureate (died 2010)
- 1929 – Mike Hawthorn, English racing driver (died 1959)
- 1929 – Liz Sheridan, American actress (died 2022)
- 1929 – Max von Sydow, Swedish-French actor (died 2020)
- 1930 – Claude Bolling, French pianist, composer, and actor (died 2020)
- 1930 – Dolores Huerta, American activist, co-founded the United Farm Workers (d. 2026)
- 1930 – Spede Pasanen, Finnish film director and producer, comedian, and inventor (died 2001)
- 1932 – Delphine Seyrig, Swiss/Alsatian French actress (died 1990)
- 1932 – Omar Sharif, Egyptian actor and screenwriter (died 2015)
- 1933 – Rokusuke Ei, Japanese composer and author (died 2016)
- 1933 – Helen McElhone, Scottish politician (died 2013)
- 1934 – David Halberstam, American journalist and author (died 2007)
- 1935 – Patrick Garland, English actor and director (died 2013)
- 1935 – Peter Hollingworth, Australian bishop, 23rd Governor General of Australia (died 2026)
- 1935 – Christos Yannaras, Greek philosopher, theologian and author (died 2024)
- 1936 – John A. Bennett, American soldier (died 1961)
- 1936 – David A. Hardy, British artist
- 1936 – John Howell, English long jumper
- 1936 – John Madden, American football player, coach, and sportscaster (died 2021)
- 1936 – Bobby Smith, American singer (died 2013)
- 1937 – Bella Akhmadulina, Soviet and Russian poet, short story writer, and translator (died 2010)
- 1938 – Don Meredith, American football player and sportscaster (died 2010)
- 1939 – Claudio Magris, Italian scholar, author, and translator
- 1940 – Gloria Hunniford, British radio and television host
- 1941 – Chrysostomos II of Cyprus, (died 2022)
- 1941 – Harold Long, Canadian politician (died 2013)
- 1941 – Paul Theroux, American novelist, short story writer, and travel writer
- 1942 – Nick Auf der Maur, Canadian journalist and politician (died 1998)
- 1942 – Ian Callaghan, English footballer
- 1942 – Stuart Dybek, American novelist, short story writer, and poet
- 1943 – Andrzej Badeński, Polish-German sprinter (died 2008)
- 1943 – Margaret Pemberton, English author
- 1945 – Kevin Berry, Australian swimmer (died 2006)
- 1946 – David Angell, American screenwriter and producer (died 2001)
- 1946 – Bob Watson, American baseball player and manager (died 2020)
- 1946 – Adolf Winkelmann, German director, producer, and screenwriter
- 1947 – David A. Adler, American author and educator
- 1947 – Bunny Wailer, Jamaican singer-songwriter and drummer (died 2021)
- 1948 – Mel Blount, American football player
- 1948 – Jim Burns, Welsh artist
- 1949 – Daniel Mangeas, French banker and sportscaster
- 1950 – Ken Griffey, Sr., American baseball player and manager
- 1950 – Eddie Hazel, American guitarist (died 1992)
- 1951 – David Helvarg, American journalist and activist
- 1952 – Narayan Rane, Indian politician, 16th Chief Minister of Maharashtra
- 1952 – Masashi Sada, Japanese singer, lyricist, composer, novelist, actor, and producer
- 1952 – Steven Seagal, American actor, producer, and martial artist
- 1953 – David Moorcroft, English runner and businessman
- 1953 – Pamela Wallin, Swedish-Canadian journalist, academic, and politician
- 1953 – Terre Roche, singer-songwriter, member of the sister group The Roches
- 1954 – Paul Bearer, American wrestler and manager (died 2013)
- 1954 – Anne Lamott, American author and educator
- 1954 – Peter MacNicol, American actor
- 1954 – Juan Williams, Panamanian-American journalist and author
- 1955 – Marit Breivik, Norwegian handball player and coach
- 1955 – Lesley Garrett, English soprano and actress
- 1955 – Mike Rinder, Australian-American former Scientologist, critic (died 2025)
- 1956 – Carol V. Robinson, English chemist and academic
- 1957 – Aliko Dangote, Nigerian businessman, founded Dangote Group
- 1957 – John M. Ford, American author and poet (died 2006)
- 1957 – Steve Gustafson, Spanish-American bass player
- 1957 – Rosemary Hill, English historian and author
- 1958 – Bob Bell, Northern Irish engineer
- 1958 – Yefim Bronfman, Uzbek-American pianist
- 1958 – Brigitte Holzapfel, German high jumper
- 1959 – Babyface, American singer-songwriter and producer
- 1959 – Yvan Loubier, Canadian economist and politician
- 1959 – Brian Setzer, American singer-songwriter and guitarist
- 1960 – Steve Bisciotti, American businessman, co-founded Allegis Group
- 1960 – Katrina Leskanich, American singer-songwriter and guitarist
- 1960 – Terry Teagle, American basketball player
- 1961 – Nicky Campbell, Scottish broadcaster and journalist
- 1961 – Carole Goble, English computer scientist and academic
- 1961 – Mark Jones, American basketball player
- 1962 – Steve Tasker, American football player and sportscaster
- 1963 – Warren DeMartini, American guitarist and songwriter
- 1963 – Jeff Gray, American baseball player and coach
- 1963 – Doris Leuthard, Swiss lawyer and politician, 162nd President of the Swiss Confederation
- 1965 – Tim Alexander, American drummer and songwriter
- 1965 – Anna-Leena Härkönen, Finnish author
- 1967 – Donald Dufresne, Canadian ice hockey player and coach
- 1967 – David Rovics, American singer-songwriter
- 1968 – Metin Göktepe, Turkish photographer and journalist (died 1996)
- 1968 – Orlando Jones, American actor, producer, and screenwriter
- 1969 – Steve Glasson, Australian lawn bowler
- 1969 – Ekaterini Koffa, Greek sprinter
- 1970 – Enrico Ciccone, Canadian ice hockey player
- 1970 – Leonard Doroftei, Romanian-Canadian boxer
- 1970 – Kenny Lattimore, American singer-songwriter
- 1970 – Q-Tip, American rapper, producer, and actor
- 1971 – Indro Olumets, Estonian footballer and coach
- 1971 – Al Reyes, Dominican-American baseball player
- 1972 – Ian Harvey, Australian cricketer
- 1972 – Priit Kasesalu, Estonian computer programmer, co-created Skype
- 1973 – Guillaume Canet, French actor and director
- 1973 – Roberto Carlos, Brazilian footballer and manager
- 1973 – Aidan Moffat, Scottish singer-songwriter
- 1973 – Christopher Simmons, Canadian-American graphic designer, author, and academic
- 1974 – Eric Greitens, American soldier, author and politician
- 1974 – Petros Passalis, Greek footballer
- 1975 – Chris Carrabba, American singer-songwriter and guitarist
- 1975 – Terrence Lewis, Indian dancer and choreographer
- 1976 – Clare Buckfield, English actress
- 1976 – Yoshino Kimura, Japanese actress and singer
- 1976 – Sara Renner, Canadian skier
- 1977 – Stephanie Sheh, Taiwanese-American voice actress, director, and producer
- 1978 – Sir Christus, Finnish guitarist (died 2017)
- 1979 – Iván Alonso, Uruguayan footballer
- 1979 – Kenyon Coleman, American football player
- 1979 – Rachel Corrie, American activist (died 2003)
- 1979 – Tsuyoshi Domoto, Japanese singer-songwriter and actor
- 1979 – Sophie Ellis-Bextor, English singer-songwriter
- 1979 – Pavlos Fyssas, Greek rapper (died 2013)
- 1979 – Peter Kopteff, Finnish footballer
- 1980 – Sean Avery, Canadian ice hockey player and model
- 1980 – Charlie Hunnam, English actor
- 1980 – Shao Jiayi, Chinese footballer
- 1980 – Kasey Kahne, American race car driver
- 1980 – Andy Ram, Israeli tennis player
- 1980 – Bryce Soderberg, American singer-songwriter and bass player
- 1981 – Laura Bell Bundy, American actress and singer
- 1981 – Liz McClarnon, English singer and dancer
- 1981 – Michael Pitt, American actor, model and musician
- 1981 – Alexei Semenov, Russian ice hockey player
- 1982 – Andre Ethier, American baseball player
- 1983 – Jamie Chung, American actress
- 1983 – Andrew Dost, American guitarist and songwriter
- 1983 – Ryan Merriman, American actor
- 1983 – Hannes Sigurðsson, Icelandic footballer
- 1984 – Faustina Agolley, Australian television host
- 1984 – Jeremy Barrett, American figure skater
- 1984 – Mandy Moore, American singer-songwriter and actress
- 1984 – David Obua, Ugandan footballer
- 1984 – Damien Perquis, French-Polish footballer
- 1984 – Gonzalo Javier Rodríguez, Argentinian footballer
- 1985 – Barkhad Abdi, Somali-American actor and director
- 1985 – Willo Flood, Irish footballer
- 1985 – Jesús Gámez, Spanish footballer
- 1985 – Dion Phaneuf, Canadian ice hockey player
- 1986 – Olivia Borlée, Belgian sprinter
- 1986 – Fernando Gago, Argentine footballer and manager
- 1986 – Corey Kluber, American baseball pitcher
- 1986 – Vincent Kompany, Belgian footballer and manager
- 1986 – Tore Reginiussen, Norwegian footballer
- 1987 – Ahmed Adel Abdel Moneam, Egyptian footballer
- 1987 – Adam Friedland, American comedian
- 1987 – Hayley Westenra, New Zealand soprano
- 1988 – Chris Heston, American baseball pitcher
- 1988 – Kareem Jackson, American football player
- 1988 – Haley Joel Osment, American actor
- 1988 – Jan-Phillip Tadsen, German politician
- 1989 – Charlie Culberson, American baseball player
- 1990 – Ben Amos, English footballer
- 1990 – Andile Jali, South African footballer
- 1990 – Alex Pettyfer, English actor
- 1992 – Jack Buchanan, Australian rugby league player
- 1992 – Chaz Mostert, Australian racing driver
- 1992 – Daisy Ridley, English actress
- 1994 – Siobhan Hunter, Scottish footballer
- 1996 – Andreas Christensen, Danish footballer
- 1997 – Claire Wineland, American activist and author (died 2018)
- 2000 – Fidias Panayiotou, Cypriot internet celebrity and politician
- 2004 – Ismaël Gharbi, French-Spanish footballer
- 2004 – Savinho, Brazilian footballer

== Deaths ==
=== Pre-1600 ===
- 879 – Louis the Stammerer, king of West Francia (born 846)
- 948 – Hugh of Arles, king of Italy
- 1008 – Notker of Liège, French bishop (born 940)
- 1216 – Erik Knutsson, king of Sweden (born 1180)
- 1282 – Ahmad Fanakati, chief minister under Kublai Khan
- 1309 – Elisabeth von Rapperswil, Swiss countess (born 1261)
- 1362 – Maud, English noblewoman (born 1339)
- 1500 – Michael Tarchaniota Marullus, Greek scholar and poet
- 1533 – Frederick I, king of Denmark and Norway (born 1471)
- 1545 – Costanzo Festa, Italian composer
- 1585 – Gregory XIII, pope of the Catholic Church (born 1502)
- 1598 – Jacopo Mazzoni, Italian philosopher (born 1548)
- 1599 – Gabrielle d'Estrées, French mistress of Henry IV of France (born 1571)

=== 1601–1900 ===
- 1601 – Mark Alexander Boyd, Scottish soldier and poet (born 1562)
- 1619 – Thomas Jones, English-Irish archbishop and politician, Lord Chancellor of Ireland (born 1550)
- 1640 – Agostino Agazzari, Italian composer and theorist (born 1578)
- 1644 – William Brewster, English official and pilgrim leader (born 1566)
- 1646 – Santino Solari, Swiss architect and sculptor (born 1576)
- 1667 – Jan Marek Marci, Czech medical doctor and author (born 1595)
- 1704 – Wilhelm Egon von Fürstenberg, German cardinal (born 1629)
- 1756 – Giacomo Antonio Perti, Italian composer (born 1661)
- 1760 – Jean Lebeuf, French historian and author (born 1687)
- 1786 – John Byron, English admiral and politician, 24th Commodore Governor of Newfoundland (born 1723)
- 1806 – Horatio Gates, English-American general (born 1727)
- 1813 – Joseph-Louis Lagrange, Italian mathematician and astronomer (born 1736)
- 1821 – Gregory V of Constantinople, Ecumenical Patriarch of Constantinople (born 1746)
- 1823 – Karl Leonhard Reinhold, Austrian philosopher and academic (born 1757)
- 1871 – Lucio Norberto Mansilla, Argentinian general and politician (born 1789)
- 1889 – William Crichton, Scottish engineer and shipbuilder (born 1827)

=== 1901–present ===
- 1909 – Algernon Charles Swinburne, English poet, playwright, novelist, and critic (born 1837)
- 1919 – Emiliano Zapata, Mexican general (born 1879)
- 1920 – Moritz Cantor, German mathematician and historian (born 1829)
- 1922 – Luisa Capetillo, Puerto Rican labor organizer
- 1923 – Liam Lynch, Irish Republican Army Chief of Staff (born 1892)
- 1931 – Kahlil Gibran, Lebanese-American poet, painter, and philosopher (born 1883)
- 1935 – Rosa Campbell Praed, Australian novelist (born 1851)
- 1938 – King Oliver, American cornet player and bandleader (born 1885)
- 1942 – Carl Schenstrøm, Danish actor and director (born 1881)
- 1943 – Andreas Faehlmann, Estonian-German sailor and engineer (born 1898)
- 1945 – Hendrik Nicolaas Werkman, Dutch printer and typographer (born 1882)
- 1947 – Charles Nordhoff, English-American lieutenant and author (born 1887)
- 1950 – Fevzi Çakmak, Turkish field marshal and politician, 2nd Prime Minister of Turkey (born 1876)
- 1954 – Auguste Lumière, French director and producer (born 1862)
- 1954 – Oscar Mathisen, Norwegian speed skater (born 1888)
- 1955 – Pierre Teilhard de Chardin, French priest, theologian, and philosopher (born 1881)
- 1958 – Chuck Willis, American singer-songwriter (born 1928)
- 1960 – André Berthomieu, French director and screenwriter (born 1903)
- 1962 – Michael Curtiz, Hungarian-American director, producer, and screenwriter (born 1886)
- 1962 – Stuart Sutcliffe, Scottish artist and musician (born 1940)
- 1965 – Lloyd Casner, American race car driver, founded Casner Motor Racing Division (born 1928)
- 1965 – Linda Darnell, American actress (born 1923)
- 1966 – Evelyn Waugh, English soldier, novelist, journalist and critic (born 1903)
- 1968 – Gustavs Celmiņš, Latvian lieutenant and politician (born 1899)
- 1969 – Harley Earl, American businessman (born 1893)
- 1975 – Walker Evans, American photographer (born 1903)
- 1975 – Marjorie Main, American actress (born 1890)
- 1978 – Hjalmar Mäe, Estonian politician (born 1901)
- 1979 – Nino Rota, Italian pianist, composer, and conductor (born 1911)
- 1980 – Kay Medford, American actress and singer (born 1919)
- 1981 – Howard Thurman, American author, philosopher and civil rights activist (born 1899)
- 1983 – Issam Sartawi, Palestinian activist (born 1935)
- 1985 – Zisis Verros, Greek chieftain of the Macedonian Struggle (born 1880)
- 1986 – Linda Creed, American singer-songwriter (born 1948)
- 1988 – Ezekias Papaioannou, Greek Cypriot politician (born 1908)
- 1991 – Kevin Peter Hall, American actor (born 1955)
- 1991 – Martin Hannett, English guitarist and producer (born 1948)
- 1991 – Natalie Schafer, American actress (born 1900)
- 1992 – Sam Kinison, American comedian and actor (born 1953)
- 1993 – Chris Hani, South African activist and politician (born 1942)
- 1994 – Sam B. Hall, Jr., American lawyer, judge, and politician (born 1924)
- 1995 – Morarji Desai, Indian politician, 4th Prime Minister of India (born 1896)
- 1997 – Michael Dorris, American author and academic (born 1945)
- 1998 – Seraphim of Athens, Greek archbishop (born 1913)
- 1999 – Heinz Fraenkel-Conrat, German-American biochemist and medical doctor (born 1910)
- 1999 – Jean Vander Pyl, American actress and voice artist (born 1919)
- 2000 – Peter Jones, English actor and screenwriter (born 1920)
- 2000 – Larry Linville, American actor (born 1939)
- 2003 – Little Eva, American singer (born 1943)
- 2004 – Jacek Kaczmarski, Polish singer-songwriter, guitarist, and poet (born 1957)
- 2004 – Sakıp Sabancı, Turkish businessman and philanthropist, founded Sabancı Holding (born 1933)
- 2005 – Norbert Brainin, Austrian violinist (born 1923)
- 2005 – Scott Gottlieb, American drummer (born 1970)
- 2005 – Archbishop Iakovos of America (born 1911)
- 2005 – Al Lucas, American football player (born 1978)
- 2005 – Wally Tax, Dutch singer-songwriter (born 1948)
- 2006 – Kleitos Kyrou, Greek poet and translator (born 1921)
- 2007 – Charles Philippe Leblond, French-Canadian biologist and academic (born 1910)
- 2007 – Dakota Staton, American singer (born 1930)
- 2009 – Deborah Digges, American poet and educator (born 1950)
- 2009 – Ioannis Patakis, Greek politician (born 1940)
- 2010 – Casualties in the 2010 Polish Air Force Tu-154 crash included:
  - Ryszard Kaczorowski, Polish soldier and politician, 6th President of the Republic of Poland (born 1919)
  - Maria Kaczyńska, Polish economist, First Lady of Poland (born 1942)
  - Lech Kaczyński, Polish lawyer and politician, 4th President of Poland (born 1949)
  - Anna Walentynowicz, Ukrainian-Polish journalist and activist (born 1929)
- 2010 – Dixie Carter, American actress and singer (born 1939)
- 2012 – Raymond Aubrac, French engineer and activist (born 1914)
- 2012 – Barbara Buchholz, German theremin player and composer (born 1959)
- 2012 – Lili Chookasian, Armenian-American operatic singer (born 1921)
- 2012 – Luis Aponte Martínez, Puerto Rican cardinal (born 1922)
- 2012 – Akin Omoboriowo, Nigerian lawyer and politician (born 1932)
- 2013 – Robert Edwards, English physiologist and academic, Nobel Prize laureate (born 1925)
- 2013 – Gordon Thomas, English cyclist (born 1921)
- 2015 – Richie Benaud, Australian cricketer and sportscaster (born 1930)
- 2015 – Rose Francine Rogombé, Gabonese lawyer and politician, President of Gabon (born 1942)
- 2015 – Peter Walsh, Australian farmer and politician, 6th Australian Minister for Finance (born 1935)
- 2016 – Howard Marks, Welsh cannabis smuggler, writer, and legalisation campaigner (born 1945)
- 2023 – Al Jaffee, American cartoonist (born 1921)
- 2024 – O. J. Simpson, American football player, actor, and broadcaster (born 1947)
- 2025 – Leo Beenhakker, Dutch football manager (born 1942)
- 2025 – Ted Kotcheff, Canadian film and television director (born 1931)
- 2025 – Peter Lovesey, British writer (born 1936)
- 2026 – Eliot Engel, American politician (born 1947)
- 2026 – Anja Hatakka, Finnish actress and beauty pageant competitor (born 1938)
- 2026 – Sid Krofft, Canadian-American puppeteer and producer (born 1929)
- 2026 – Browning Nagle, American football player (born 1968)

== Holidays and observances ==
- Christian feast day:
  - Blessed Anthony Neyrot
  - Fulbert of Chartres
  - James, Azadanus and Abdicius
  - Magdalene of Canossa
  - Mikael Agricola (Lutheran)
  - Pierre Teilhard de Chardin (Episcopal Church)
  - William of Ockham (Anglicanism)
  - William Law (Anglicanism)
  - April 10 (Eastern Orthodox liturgics)
- Day of the Builder (Azerbaijan)
- Feast of the Third Day of the Writing of the Book of the Law (Thelema)
- Siblings Day (International observance)
