= Avdella (disambiguation) =

Avdella (Greek: Αβδέλλα) may refer to several places in Greece:

- Avdella, Evros, a settlement in the municipal unit of Metaxades in the Evros regional unit
- Avdella (Aromanian: Avdhela), a municipal unit in the Grevena regional unit
  - Avdhela Project, an Aromanian digital library and cultural initiative named after Avdella
