= Housework - Women Spinning Wool =

Documentary film of the 1900s

- Directed by: Manaki brothers
- Cinematography: Manaki Brothers
- Running time: 1 minute
- Country: Ottoman Empire

Housework - Women Spinning Wool or Women Spinning Wool, is a 1905 or 1907 documentary film directed by the Manaki brothers.

The film is a 1-minute silent and black-and-white film, depicting scenes from the daily lives of women in Avdella, which is now in Greece, is considered by some film historians to be the first Turkish film.
