= Archimandrite Averchie =

Aromanian monk and schoolteacher

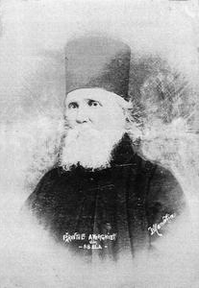
- Born: Atanasie Iaciu Buda; 1806 or 1818; Avdella, Ottoman Empire (now Greece)
- Died: Around February, unknown year Grizano, Ottoman Empire (now Greece)
- Occupations: Monk, schoolteacher

Archimandrite Averchie or Averkios (1806/1818 – ?; Romanian: Arhimandritul Averchie, also Averhie or Averkie; Aromanian: Arhimandrit Averchi; Greek: Αρχιμανδρίτης Αβέρκιος, romanized: Archimandrítis Avérkios), born Atanasie Iaciu Buda (Greek: Αθανάσιος Γιάτσου Μπούντας, romanized: Athanásios Giátsou Boúntas), was an Aromanian monk and schoolteacher. Born in Avdella, he became hegumen and archimandrite in Mount Athos, where he was known as "Averchie the Vlach" (Greek: Αβέρκιος ο βλάχος, romanized: Avérkios o Vláchos).

Averchie was sent to Romania in 1860, where he established contact with several intellectual and political figures. He was the head teacher of a school in Bucharest for Aromanian children whom he and Ioan D. Caragiani had recruited and taken to Romania in 1865 to be educated and become teachers of the first Romanian schools for Aromanians. Averchie is considered a relevant figure of the early Romanian-backed Aromanian national movement.

== Biography ==
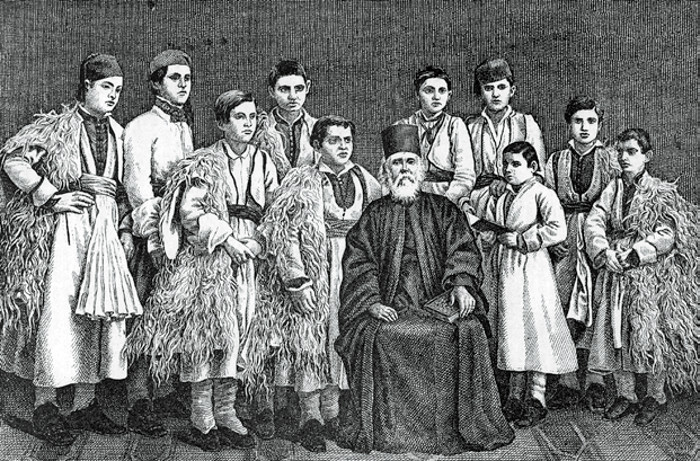
Archimandrite Averchie and his first ten students. Picture featured in Albumul macedo-român in 1880.

Averchie (or Averkios) was born in the Aromanian village of Avdella (Aromanian: Avdhela), then in the Ottoman Empire and now in Greece. Born either in 1806 or 1818, his date of birth is controversial among researchers. His secular name was Atanasie Iaciu Buda. Atanasie's father was celnic Iani Iaciu Buda, who was mayor of Avdella during the times of Ali Pasha of Ioannina. His mother was Anastasia ("Tasa") and he had two sisters, Marița (born 1803) and Șanea (born 1805). He also had an adoptive sister, Gheorgana, whom his parents adopted at the age of four, before the birth of any of the three other siblings. She was married to a man named Panaioti at a young age. Atanasie's nephew Ioan Șomu Tomescu was a teacher who wrote an account on the life of Averchie published in 1929 by the Aromanian historian Victor Papacostea.

Atanasie was orphaned by his father at a relatively young age, and after completing his education, he became a monk on Mount Athos, first at the Agiou Pavlou Monastery and then at the Monastery of Iviron. Becoming hegumen and archimandrite, Averchie was known in Mount Athos as "Averchie the Vlach" (Greek: Αβέρκιος ο βλάχος, romanized: Avérkios o Vláchos; "Vlach" being a name of the Greeks for the Aromanians). In the Iviron Monastery he met the Romanian general and politician Christian Tell. When asked by Tell Ești român, părinte? ("Are you Romanian, father?"), Averchie answered Da, escu armân ("Yes, I am Aromanian"). He is also recorded as having exclaimed Și eu hiu armân ("I am Aromanian too") in 1862 during a military ceremony in Bucharest in Romania which emotionally moved him.

In 1860, Averchie was sent to Romania to settle the Iviron Monastery's disputes with the Romanian government regarding the lands of the monastic estates. There, he created contacts with important Romanian intellectual and political figures, including Cezar Bolliac, Dimitrie Bolintineanu, C. A. Rosetti, Dimitrie Cozacovici and even Prince Alexandru Ioan Cuza himself. In 1865, 20,000 Romanian lei were allocated for the establishment of a boarding school in Bucharest for Aromanian children from the Ottoman Empire, which functioned at the monastery of the Church of the Holy Apostles. Together with Romanian Aromanian folklorist and translator Ioan D. Caragiani, Averchie recruited that same year ten children from Aromanian villages of the Pindus mountains, including some from his native Avdella, and took them to Bucharest to be educated at the school and return later as teachers of the first Romanian schools for Aromanians. Averchie was the head teacher of the school for years, and was later accused of misusing money. The school would end up being disestablished, after which Averchie retired to the Radu Vodă Monastery in Bucharest, where he remained until 1875. He then returned to his home region, retiring to a monastery in the village of Grizano, where he spent the last moments of his life.

Despa I. Șomu Tomescu, daughter of Șomu Tomescu and grandniece of Averchie, gave an account on the death of Averchie based on what she had heard from her father and grandmother. According to her, Averchie would have died poisoned by Greek monks around February (she did not know of which year) after confessing a dying woman of a Greek family in the monastery in Grizano. Romanian Aromanian biographer and essayist Sterie Diamandi stated that "we do not know to what extent this version corresponds to reality" and lamented the fact that the date and details of the death of a prominent figure like Averchie were not known. Today, Averchie, together with Apostol Mărgărit, are seen as some of the first and most important figures of the Aromanian national movement that was supported and promoted by Romania. Romanian researchers Anca Tanașoca and Nicolae Șerban Tanașoca defined both figures as "the founders and organizers of the network of Romanian schools and churches of the Balkan Peninsula", which functioned under the tutelage of the Romanian government until the times of World War II. According to Diamandi, Averchie's arrival in Romania started a new epoch in the history of the Aromanians, "the epoch of national rebirth".
