= Hatakka =

Hatakka is a surname. Notable people with the surname include:

- Anja Hatakka (1938–2026), Finnish actress
- Dani Hatakka (born 1994), Finnish footballer
- Kärtsy Hatakka (born 1967), Finnish musician
- Santeri Hatakka (born 2001), Finnish ice hockey player
