= The Weavers (1905 film) =

Short silent documentary film from the Balkans, 1905

15-second clip showing the 114-year-old Despina Manaki spinning.

The Weavers or Grandmother Despina is a short silent, black and white documentary film.

It was made in 1905 by the Balkan film pioneers the Manaki brothers in the small Aromanian village of Avdella (Aromanian: Avdhela), then in the Ottoman vilayet of Monastir, present day Greece. It is about 60 seconds long and depicts the Manakis' aunts and 114-year-old grandmother Despina spinning and weaving. It was originally called "Our 114-year-old grandmother at work weaving", but has come to be known as The Weavers. It is believed to be the first film shot anywhere in the Ottoman Balkans. Despina, born in 1791, is believed to be the earliest-born person recorded on film; The film was shot with 35 mm film with an Urban Bioscope movie camera (serial number 300) imported from London.

An extract from the film appears at the beginning of Theo Angelopoulos's 1995 film Ulysses' Gaze.

== Bibliography ==
- Greece in modern times: an annotated bibliography of works published in English in twenty-two academic disciplines during the twentieth century, 1:109
- Katerina Zacharia, "'Reel' Hellenisms: Perceptions of Greece in Greek Cinema" in Katerina Zacharia, Hellenisms, p. 323
