= List of settlements named Zaporozhsky =

Zaporozhsky (Russian: Запорожский; masculine), Zaporozhskaya (Запорожская; feminine), or Zaporozhskoye (Запорожское; neuter) is the name of several rural localities in Russia:

- Zaporozhskoye, a settlement in Zaporozhskoye Settlement Municipal Formation of Priozersky District in Leningrad Oblast; 60°34′N 30°33′E
- Zaporozhskaya, a stanitsa in Zaporozhsky Rural Okrug of Temryuksky District in Krasnodar Krai; 45°23′N 36°52′E
