= Josef Hauser (zoologist) =

Hungarian zoologist (1920–2004)

- Born: Josef Hauser; January 31, 1920
- Died: March 10, 2004 (aged 84); Novo Hamburgo, Rio Grande do Sul, Brazil
- Scientific career
- Fields: Zoology, Helminthology
- Workplaces: Universidade do Vale do Rio dos Sinos
- Doctoral advisor: Otto Steinböck

Josef Hauser S. J. (January 31, 1920 – March 10, 2004) was a Hungarian zoologist and Jesuit priest.

== Life ==
Josef Hauser was born in 1920 in southern Hungary. During his childhood and adolescence, he studied in a Jesuit school.

From 1939 to 1941 he went to the novitiate of the Society of Jesus in Budapest. There, he had much contact with physicians, but they struggle to understand each other due to language differences. Hauser, however, became interested in Medicine and told the master of the novices about his decision to study the subject at the university. A letter was sent to Rome to announce Hauser's interest, but the idea was rejected. He was then oriented to study natural history in order to "learn everything that physicians know".

In 1943, he was sent to serve in World War II, joining the Hungarian army. He worked at the hospital protecting the trains that transported the injured from Russia to Hungary and Germany. After the war, he moved to Austria and studied German at the Jesuit school Stella Matutina. After concluding his studies there, he went back to the university to conclude the studies he started in Budapest, graduating in 1949.

After graduating, Hauser started his doctoral studies, earning a Ph.D. degree in scholastic philosophy and another in zoology from the University of Innsbruck. At this time he met Oscar Nedel, a Brazilian Jesuit Father who went to Europe in order to study natural sciences in Germany because he had been selected to be a professor in a new university. Nedel talked to Hauser about Brazil's natural beauties and make him become interested in moving to Brazil. He was allowed to move after a letter was received asking for professors to teach in a new university.

Hauser was ordained on June 21, 1955 in Brazil and in 1958 he helped to found the São Leopoldo School of Philosophy, Sciences and Literature that would later become Unisinos. During this time he also became chaplain in the Brazilian Air Force in order to work with pastoral care and eventually became a pilot.

In Unisinos, he founded and directed the Instituto de Pesquisa de Planárias (Planarian Research Institute), where he continued his research on triclads, the group with which he was working since the beginning of his academic life in Europe. He was well known among his colleagues and students by his ability to improvise and build laboratory tools from waste.

Hauser continued to work as a researcher and priest until his death on March 30, 2004.

== Work ==
While working in Innsbruck, Hauser developed a new histological technique that eliminated the use of xylene, a toxic compound that facilitated paraffin infiltration in tissues to be sectioned, by replacing it with isopropyl alcohol, an almost unharmful substance.

Most of Hauser's academic research was dedicated to the study of the diversity, anatomy, physiology and behavior of planarians.

=== Selected works ===
- Hauser, Josef (1952). "Ausschaltung des Xylols in der histologischen Technik". Mikroskopie. 7: 208–210.
- Hauser, Josef; Maurmann, Ernst (1959). "Studien über die Bewegungen des "Genus Geoplana"". Pesquisas. 3: 631–646.
- Hauser, Josef; Silveira, S. M. O.; Carvalho, I. M. (1979). "Modificações morfológicas nos olhos de Dugesia schubarti (Marcus, 1946) durante a formação da nova cabeça". Acta Biologica Leopoldensia. 1 (2): 225–236.
- Hauser, Josef (1979). "Modificações morfológicas nos olhos de Dugesia schubarti (Marchus, 1946) durante a formação da nova cabeça". Acta Biologica Leopoldensia. 1 (2): 237–262.
- Sluys, R.; Hauser, J.; Wirth, Q. J. (1997). "Deviation from the Groundplan: a unique new species of freshwater planarian from South Brazil (Platyhelminthes, Tridadida, Paludicola)". Journal of Zoology. 241 (3): 593–601. doi:10.1111/j.1469-7998.1997.tb04851.x. ISSN 0952-8369.
