= Church of the Holy Apostles, Bucharest =

Heritage site in Bucharest, Romania

Coordinates: 44°25′46″N 26°05′39″E

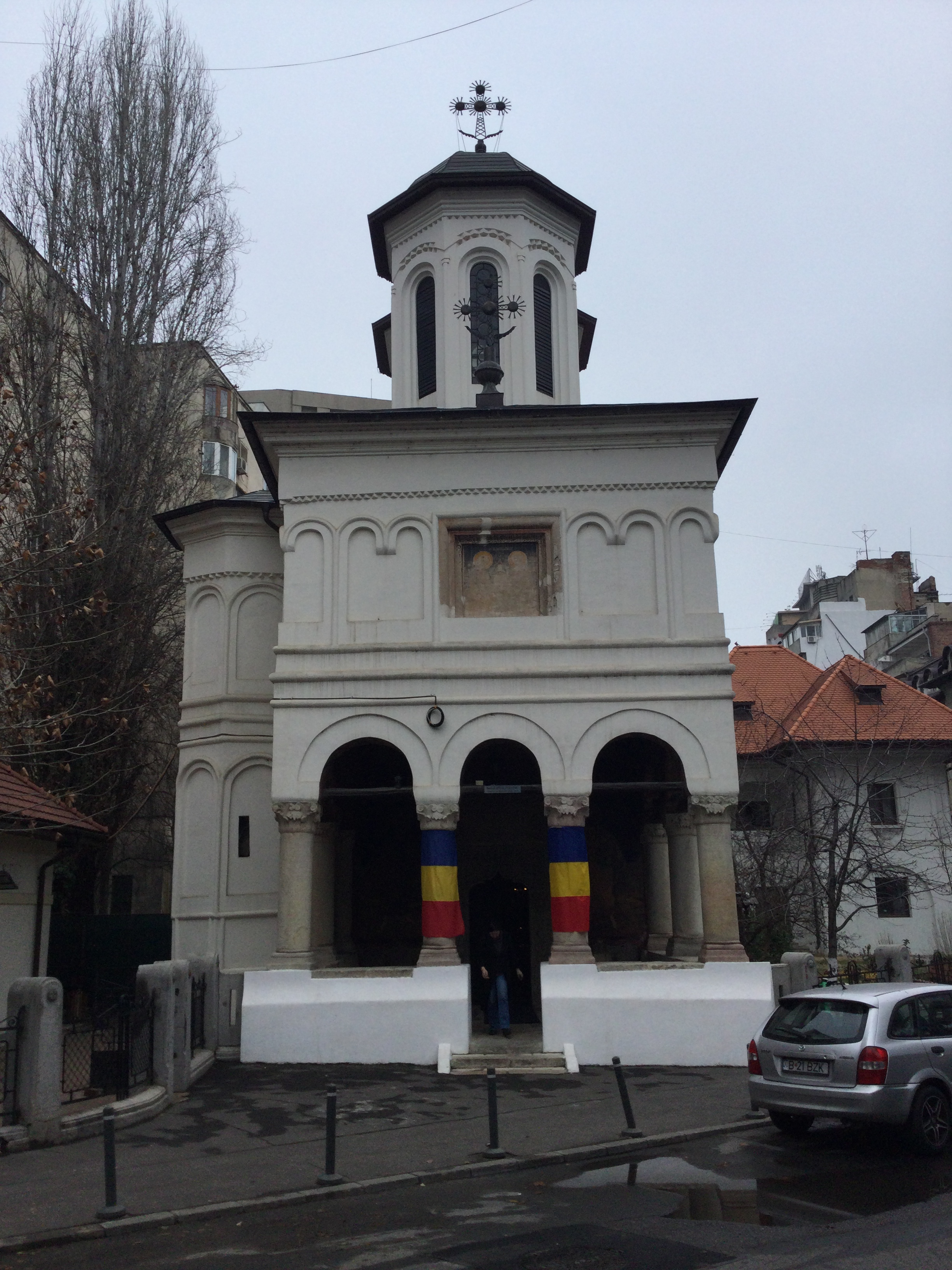
Church of the Holy Apostles

The Church of the Holy Apostles (Romanian: Biserica Sfinții Apostoli) is a Romanian Orthodox church located at 1 Sfinții Apostoli Street in Bucharest, Romania. It is dedicated to Saints Peter and Paul.

== History ==
The first church on the site was made of wood and dated to the latter half of the 16th century. According to a 1626 document, a monastery existed there by 1585–1586 and was under the protection of a monastery in Tarnovo, Bulgaria. Hence, it was known as the Tarnovo or Archimandrite’s Monastery (Mănăstirea Tarnovului or Arhimandritului). Prior to 1677, its allegiance changed to the Constantinople Patriarchate. The 1705 pisanie records recent repairs to the narthex and flooring by the Metropolitan of Sofia, a native of Tarnovo. The large princely monastery featured an inn and surrounding cells, mentioned around 1790 but demolished in the 1870s.

A 1715 pisanie on the western wall mentions that the church was built in stone by Prince Matei Basarab (reigned 1632–1654) and that his successor Ștefan Cantacuzino added a bell tower, portico and door with frame of carved stone. The inscription is surrounded by well preserved portraits of the ktetors: Basarab, Cantacuzino and their wives, other members of the Cantacuzino family and their coat of arms. A ktetor list is also found in the altar. The church was wrecked by the 1802 and 1838 earthquakes. Its reported three domes of masonry were replaced by a single one of wood. A 1936 restoration saw the rebuilding of the bell tower and the retouching of the 1715 interior painting. Further repairs and consolidation took place after the 1940 and 1977 quakes, as well as in four stages between 1949 and 1976.

== Description ==
The cross-shaped church measures 27.4 meters long by 7 meters wide, with very thick walls (1.4 to 1.8 meters). It has a dome above the nave and a bell tower above the narthex; both are remade of masonry, with large windows on every side. The narthex has a spherical ceiling resting on pendentives. The large square portico has three unequal arches on the western facade and two each on the sides, resting on stone columns with floral capitals. Entry is through a portal; the sculpted stone frame also encompasses the pisanie, which depicts the Wallachian coat of arms and the double-headed eagle of the Cantacuzenes. The facades, typical of the 18th century, are divided into two nearly equal sections by a string course formed from three thin lines separated from one another. The lower half is decorated with rounded frames that alternate with large windows of nearly the same size. The upper part has pairs of arched frames. The square dome bases are likewise decorated with rows of small arches.

The church hosts numerous carved stone graves in the portico and narthex as well as outside. The 1927 parish house, designed by Cristofi Cerchez and located to the southwest, has two floors, nine rooms and a storage area, all above a double basement with arched ceiling. Other household annexes were demolished in the late 19th century. Archaeological excavations in 1956 unearthed large arched rooms, seemingly from the time of Matei Basarab, likely the site of the refectory, and a two-story house from around 1700. The church is listed as a historic monument by Romania's Ministry of Culture and Religious Affairs. Also listed are the parish house and the monastic foundations.
