= Christopher Simmons =

American graphic designer (born 1973)

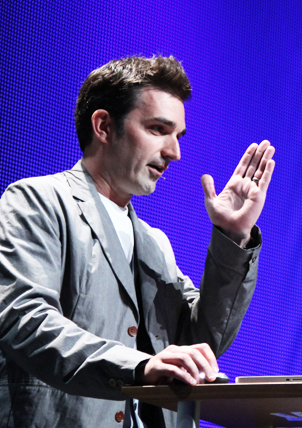
- Christopher Simmons presenting at Cusp Conference 2011
- Born: April 10, 1973 (age 52); Canada
- Education: California College of the Arts
- Occupation(s): Graphic designer, design leader, writer, educator

Christopher Simmons (born April 10, 1973), is a Canadian-born American graphic designer, design leader, writer, and educator. He is based in San Francisco, California.

== Career ==
Named one of the "50 most influential designers working today", he served on the board of directors of the San Francisco chapter of the AIGA from 1996 to 1999, and again as president from 2004 to 2006. Among his enduring accomplishments in that position was the creation of San Francisco Design Week, and the introduction of the first public design-oriented lectures at the Apple Store, a free program which continues to this day. On completion of Simmons' tenure, mayor Gavin Newsom issued an official proclamation declaring San Francisco to be a city where "design makes a difference." Christopher currently serves on the AIGA's national board of directors.

Simmons is the principal creative director of the San Francisco design office MINE and the creator of the art installation Everything is OK.

The author of four books on graphic design, Simmons is also a frequent speaker on graphic design at schools and design organizations across the United States. His column My First Time appears regularly in "STEP inside design" magazine. He has contributed to works in the permanent collections of the San Francisco Museum of Modern Art and the Smithsonian Institution, and exhibited works at The Museum of Contemporary Art in Hiroshima, Japan, Taipei Design Week, and the Brno Design Biennial. Simmons developed and taught courses in Identity Design at the Academy of Art University in San Francisco, and was an adjunct professor of design at the California College of the Arts (CCA) in San Francisco (his alma mater).

== Books ==
- Logo Lab, HOW Design Books, 2005 (ISBN 1-58180-549-7)
- Letterhead & Logo Design 9, Rockport Publishers, 2006 (ISBN 1-59253-182-2)
- Color Harmony: Logos Rockport Publishers, 2006 (ISBN 1-59253-244-6)
- Just Design HOW Design Books, 2011 (ISBN 978-1600619717)
