= Avdhela Project =

Aromanian digital library and cultural initiative

Logo of the Avdhela Project

The Avdhela Project (Aromanian: Proiectulu Avdhela; Romanian: Proiectul Avdhela), also known as the Library of Aromanian Culture (Aromanian: Biblioteca di Culturâ Armâneascâ; Romanian: Biblioteca Culturii Aromâne), is a digital library and cultural initiative developed by the Predania Association. The Avdhela Project aims to collect, edit and open to the public academic works on the Aromanians based on a series of specific principles. It was launched on 24 November 2009 in Bucharest, Romania. Public events, the promotion of cultural works and the publication of audiovisual material are other activities carried out by the Avdhela Project in support of Aromanian culture.

== History ==
=== Foundation and objectives ===
The Avdhela Project was launched on 24 November 2009 at the Peasant Club of the Romanian Peasant Museum in Bucharest, Romania. The ceremony began at 18:00 EET and was attended by figures such as the Aromanian essayist and poet George Vrana, the anthropologist and director Ionuț Piturescu and the director Aleksander Zikov. The films Balkan's Digest by Piturescu and Calea Eschibaba ("Eschibaba Road") by Zikov were screened there.

The Avdhela Project is an independent nonprofit initiative developed by the Predania Association, and it aims to "identify, edit and offer" artistic and scientific works on Aromanian culture and make them free of charge and easily accessible to any potentially interested researcher or individual through its digital library. The project claims to be constructed on the principles of coherence, using the orthographic proposal for the Aromanian language of the Aromanian linguist Matilda Caragiu Marioțeanu for the preservation and edition of Aromanian works; and the principle of openness, meaning the development of cultural links between the Aromanians and the rest of the Balkan nations but also with the rest of world heritage. These objectives are projected through activities such as public events, research projects, the publication of photographic and audiovisual material and the promotion of cultural projects for young Aromanians.

The Avdhela Project has a Facebook page of its own; in 2010, it was the second page dedicated to the Aromanians with the most members in Romania, having 1,200 members and being only behind Limba armânească ("Aromanian language"), with 1,579 members. The Facebook page includes discussions and posts on both Aromanian and Romanian in equal proportion, with announcements by the page being bilingual. It has a section with the description of the group and its principles, rules and values in six languages in the following order: Aromanian, Romanian, Greek, English, French and German.

=== Activities ===
In 2012, the Avdhela Project supported a financing campaign for Iho, a documentary about four Aromanian octogenarians (Nicolae Zogu, Vasile Giogi, Dumitru Zogu and Mihai Gherase) from Cogealac, interpreters of Aromanian polyphonic music (that is, music with two or more performers), who perform several concerts with the Romanian musician Grigore Leșe after meeting him, with an album of their music later being published. In 2013, the Predania Publishing House published a book on the traditional life of the Aromanians by Iotta Naum Iotta, an Aromanian scholar and professor who wrote the book in 1961 but died five years later. He did not manage to publish the book before his passing and it was kept in his family for fifty years until Iotta's granddaughter Mioara handed it over to Maria Pariza, an Aromanian scholar from Constanța (Custantsa), Romania. From her, the book reached the Avdhela Project. Another initiative of the project is O pagină pe zi pentru cultura aromână ("A page a day for Aromanian culture"), an online campaign encouraging volunteers to help collect works relevant to the Aromanians.

The Avdhela Project is also noted for various public events. On 15 January 2012, on the Romanian National Culture Day, it organized a session of debates and readings on the relationship between the famous Romanian poet Mihai Eminescu and the Aromanian people. To honor the poet, the project published several books and studies related to him. The event was attended by Aromanian figures such as the journalist Aurica Piha, the historian and philologist Nicolae Șerban Tanașoca and Vrana. On 23 March 2019, the Avdhela Project and the Neamunit Association commemorated the memory of four Aromanians, including priest Haralambie Balamaci, who were killed in 1914 in Korçë (Curceaua, Curceauã, Curceau or Curciau) by ethnic Greek andartes troops for supporting Aromanian identity in the region. Both organizations claimed that a total of around 1,000 Aromanian, Megleno-Romanian and Romanian priests, professors and teachers as well as students were murdered for similar reasons. On 7 May of the same year, the Avdhela Project helped organize a conference at the Faculty of Orthodox Theology of the University of Bucharest on religious aspects of the Aromanians and Megleno-Romanians. This was done in collaboration with the Macedo-Romanian Cultural Society.

The Avdhela Project's library includes a large number of fully digitized books from Aromanian authors such as Caragiu Marioțeanu, Tache Papahagi or Ionel Zeana, as well as from Vrana himself. Also included are poems by Aromanian poets such as Nuși Tulliu; the Avdhela Project has also written an analysis on Tulliu's importance for Aromanian literature. Another original work of the project is Exiyisiri la Tatălu a nostru ("Interpretation to Our Father"), one of the few works covering the Christian identity and spirituality of the Aromanians.

== See also ==
- Avdella (Avdhela), the village in Greece the Avdhela Project is named after
