= Daniel Mangeas =

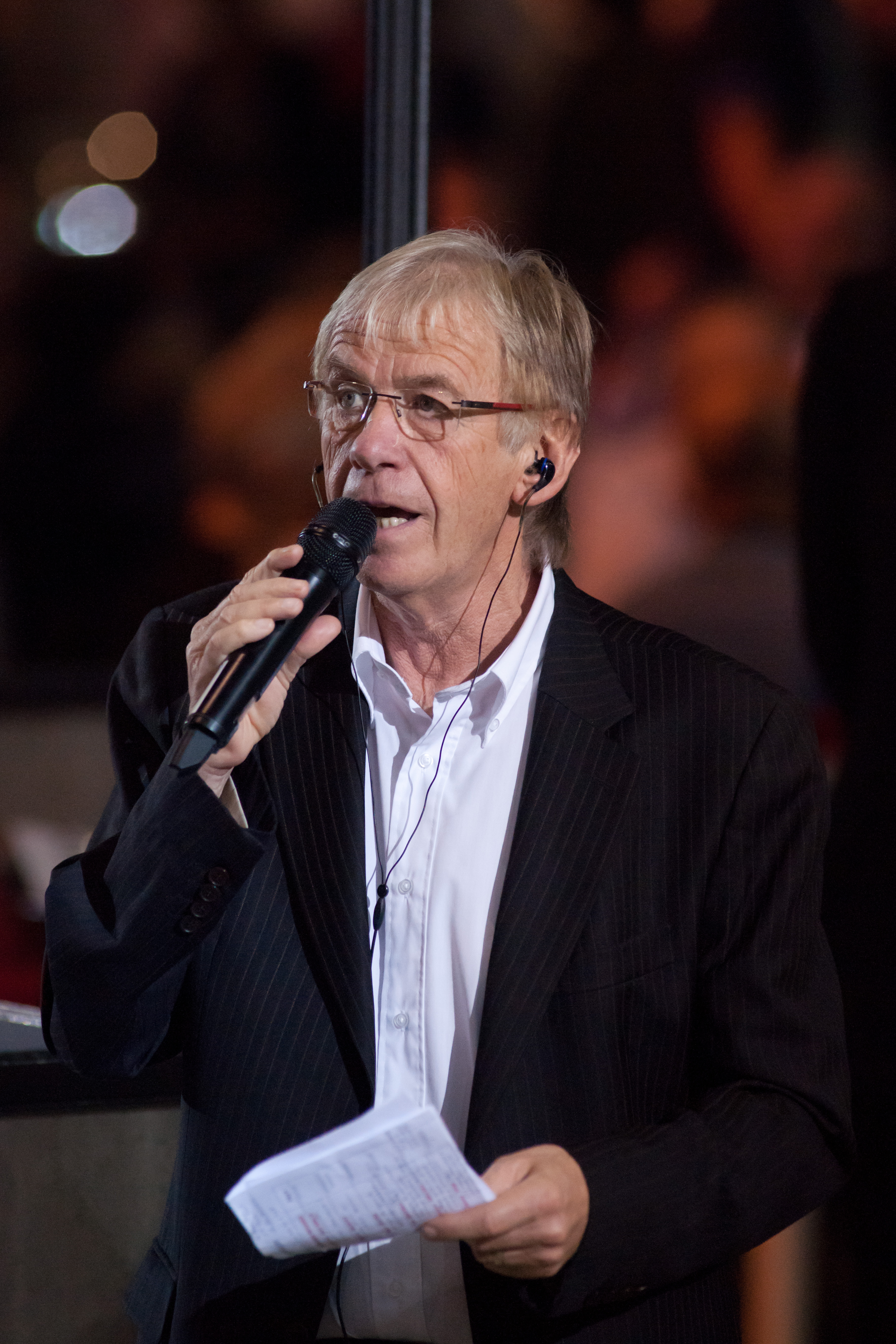
- Born: 10 April 1949 (age 77); Mortain, France
- Occupation: Cycling commentator
- Years active: 1974 – 2014; 40 years
- Known for: Commentating on the Tour de France

Daniel Mangeas (born 10 April 1949) is a former baker who was the commentator of the Tour de France and other important cycle races in France and Belgium between 1974 and 2014. During his career he commentated on 200 events a year, and tried to never speak for the rest of the day after races, to preserve his voice.

== Origins ==
Mangeas is from Saint-Martin-de-Landelles in Normandy, he was born in Mortain (Manche). He comes from a cycling family. He saw the Tour de France for the first time at the age of four. He also watched his cousin ride. He worked as a baker for 10 years in Saint-Hilaire-du-Harcouët before being discovered by Albert Bouvet, the deputy director of the Tour de France. Mangeas recounted in an interview with Vélo 101 that he had commentated on table-football games among friends when he was a child, and commented on his first bike race when he was 15 years old.

== Tour de France ==
He continued commentating after finishing his national service at 21, was heard by Albert Bouvet and recruited for the 1974 Tour de France as deputy speaker. He rode ahead of the race in an air-conditioned Chevrolet ("which were pretty rare at the time") to stand in for the main speaker, Pierre Shori. Shori's car broke down on the Saint-Lary-Soulan stage and Mangeas had to take over at the finish. Until then he had spoken only at the starts and at time trials. He said:

Raymond Poulidor won and my heart was beating at 180 a minute, but it remains one of my best memories.

He became the main speaker two years later, presenting riders at the start of each day's race for two hours, then driving the length of the race and commentating the last 50 kilometres (31 mi) at the finish.

Daniel Mangeas is a talking cycling encyclopedia, never using notes, working entirely through improvisation.

— Nico de Wee

Mangeas' commentating has been praised for its energy and his knowledge of details about each rider. On the other hand, he is criticised for presenting an over-optimistic view of the sport of cycling.
