= Zaporozhskoye =

Settlement in Priozersky District, Russia

Coordinates: 60°34′N 30°31′E

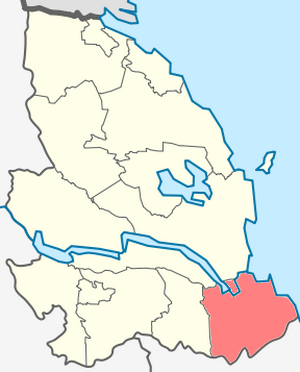
A map location of Zaporozhskoye in the Priozersky District

Zaporozhskoye (Russian: Запоро́жское; Finnish: Metsäpirtti) is a settlement on Karelian Isthmus, in Priozersky District of Leningrad Oblast. Before the Winter War and Continuation War it was the administrative center of the Metsäpirtti municipality of Finland. In 2011, the population of the settlement was 2,200 and of the municipality was 2,600.

== Notable people ==
- Anja Hatakka (1938–2026), a Finnish actress
