= Otto Steinböck =

Austrian zoologist

- Born: 10 April 1893; Graz
- Died: 6 October 1969 (aged 76); Innsbruck
- Scientific career
- Fields: Zoology, Helminthology
- Workplaces: University of Innsbruck
- Doctoral students: Josef Hauser S. J.
- Author abbrev. (zoology): Steinböck

Otto Steinböck (10 April 1893 – 6 October 1969) was an Austrian zoologist.

== Life ==
Steinböck was born in 1893 in Graz, as the ninth of 11 children. In 1911, after finishing the basic school with distinction, he started to study Law at his father's request, although his passion was zoology.

After passing the first state exam, he moved on 1 October 1913 to Nevesinje, Herzegovina, in order to serve as a one-year volunteer in the Austria-Hungary's mountain artillery. When the war broke out, he came to the Serbian front. He was wounded in 1914 and in 1918 was decorated first lieutenant and battery commander while in captivity in Trento, Italy, returning home in October 1919.

After finishing his law studies, he began to study natural history in 1920, especially the biological subjects, and earned his doctorate on 10 February 1923 with the thesis "Monographie der Prorhynchidae (Turbellaria Alloeocoela)". The turbellarians remained his subject of interest throughout his life.

From 1923 to 1927, Steinböck was unemployed, but kept himself occupied with his scientific works at the Zoological Institute in Graz. In 1925 he married Gisela von Chiapo, a great-niece of botanist Friedrich Welwitsch. She was then responsible for the couple's economic brunt with her job as a language teacher.

Finally, in July 1927, he was qualified for zoology because of his scientific works published until that time. On 1 October 1927 he became an associate assistant of Prof. Dr. A. Steuer at the Zoological Institute of the University of Innsbruck. After two years as an assistant, he was appointed as associate professor on 1 January 1930. In 1931 he became professor of zoology and director of the Zoological Institute after Steuer left in order to become director of the German-Italian Institute of Marine Biology in Rovinj.

At the beginning of World War II, Steinböck had to join again. He became the head of a mountain artillery battery on the western front and was promoted to captain of the reserve and won two awards. He was dismissed on 31 August 1940 and returned to the Institute.

From 1941 until the ward ended, Steinböck was under the rectorate of Raimund von Klebelsberg of the Faculty of Natural Sciences. He knew that it was considered a very sensitive office always committed to help colleagues who had been politically exposed. However, after the war, he ended up dismissed for political reasons. In 1947 his dismissal was converted into a retirement, so that the circumstances made it hard to consider a return to scientific work. Nevertheless, the ethical attitude of the faculty insisted on his reinstatement and he was eventually rehabilitated in November 1950 and reappointed as a professor on 6 February 1951. He retired in 1963, becoming an emeritus professor, and died on 6 October 1969 in Innsbruck.

== Work ==
Most Steinböck's works were focused on the anatomy of turbellarians. He also published several limnobiological studies conducted in lakes and streams in the Alps.

=== Selected works ===
- Steinböck, O. (1923). "Eine neue Gruppe allöocöler Turbellarien: Alloeocoela Typhlocoela (Familie Prorhynchidae)". Zool. Anz. 58: 233–242.
- Steinböck, O. (1924). "Die Bedeutung der Hofstenia atroviridis Bock für die Stellung der Alloeocoela im System der Turbellarien". Zool. Anz. 59: 156–166.
- Steinböck, O. (1924). "Untersuchungen über die Geschlechtstrakt-darmvebindung bie Turbellarien nebst einem Beitrag zur Morphologie des Tricladendarmes". Z. Morphol. Ökol. Tiere. 2: 461–504. doi:10.1007/BF01254873. S2CID 31322588.
- Steinböck, O. (1925). "Zur Systematik der Turbellaria metamerata, zugleich ein Beitrag zur Morphologie des Tricladen-Nervensystems". Zool. Anz. 64: 165–192.
- Steinböck, O. (1926). "Nachtrag zur Systematik der Turbellaria metamerata". Zool. Anz. 66: 1–4.
- Steinböck, O. (1926). "Zur Ökologie der alpinen Turbellarien". Z. Morphol. Ökol. Tiere. 5: 424–446. doi:10.1007/BF00408155. S2CID 42649091.
- Steinböck, O. (1927). "Monographie der Prorhynchidae (Turbellaria)". Z. Morphol. Ökol. Tiere. 8 (3–4): 538–662. doi:10.1007/BF00407451. S2CID 26166062.
- Steinböck, O. (1928). "Beiträge zur Kenntnis der Trubellarienfauna Grönlands. I. Bothrioplanida und Tricladida". Meddelelser Om Groenland. 74: 71–82.
- Steinböck, O. (1929). "Hydrobiologische Forschungen in den Ostalpen". Forschungen U. Fortschritte. 5: 415–416.
- Steinböck, O. (1930). "Die Lebensbedirigungen der Tierwelt des Hochgebirges". Tiroler Fischer. 5 (5): 49–53.
- Steinböck, O. (1931). "Zur Lebensweise einiger Tiere des Ewigschneegebietes". Z. Morphol. Ökol. Tiere. 20 (4): 707–718. doi:10.1007/BF00407684. S2CID 43225951.
- Steinböck, O. (1931). "Die Tierwelt des Ewigschneegebietes". Zeitschrift des Deutschen und Oesterreichischen Alpenvereins. 62: 29–46.
- Steinböck, O. (1932). "Zur Turbellarienfauna der Südalpen, zugleich ein Beitrag zur geographischen Verbreitung der Süsswasserturbellarien". Zoogeographica. 1: 209–262.
- Steinböck, O. (1932). "Die Turbellarien des arktischen Gebietes. In: Römer & Schaudinn". Fauna Arctica. 6: 295–342.
- Steinböck, O. (1933). "Die Turbellarienfauna der Umgebung von Rovingno". Thalassia. 1.
- Steinböck, O. (1934). "Die Tierwelt der Gletschergewässer". Zeitschrift des Deutschen und Oesterreichischen Alpenvereins. 65: 263–275.
- Steinböck, O. (1934). "Zur Frage der Sprungschicht in Hochgebirgsseen". Arch. Hydrobiol. 27: 397–415.
- Steinböck, O. (1936). "Über Kryokonitlöcher und ihre biologische Bedeutung". Zeitschrift für Gletscherkunde. 24: 1–21.
- Steinböck, O. (1938). "Über die Stellung der Gattung Nemertoderma Steinbock im System der Turbellarien". Acta Soc Fauna Flora Fennica. 62: 1–28.
- Steinböck, O. (1954). "Sobre la mision del "plasmodio digestivo" en la regeneración de Amphiscolops (Turbellaria Acoela)". Publ Inst Appl Biol. 17: 101–117.
