= Zisis Verros =

Greek soldier of the Macedonian Struggle

Kapetan (Chieftain) Zisis Verros
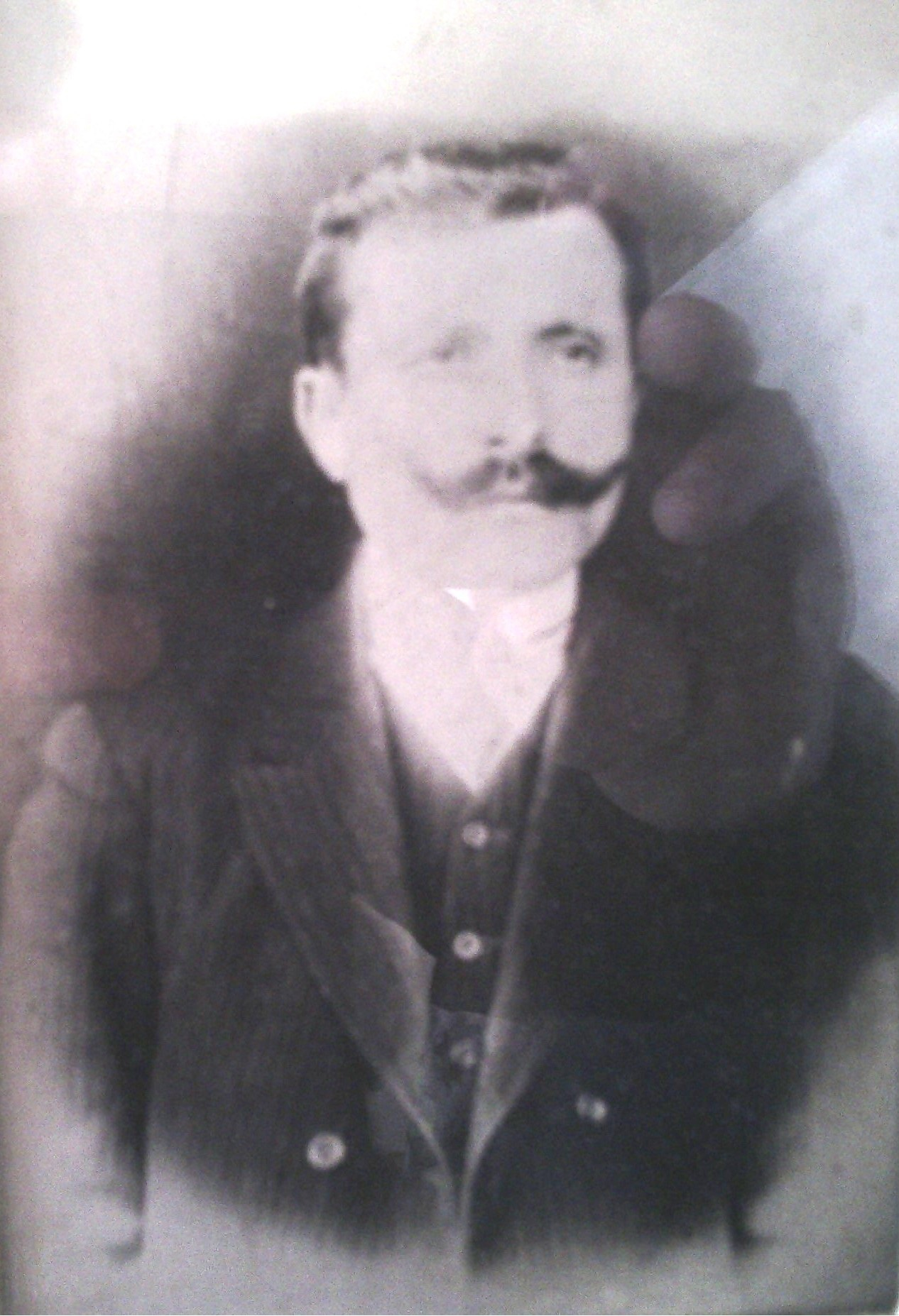
- Zisis Verros c. 1900s.
- Native name: Ζήσης Βέρρος
- Born: 16 August 1880; Avdella, Monastir Vilayet, Ottoman Empire (now Greece)
- Died: 10 April 1985 (aged 104) Avdella, Grevena, Greece
- Allegiance: Kingdom of Greece
- Branch: HMC
- Conflicts: Macedonian Struggle: Battle of Orliaka; Battle of Eveltsi; Operation of Paleor
- Awards: Commemorative Medal for the Macedonian Struggle; Black Emblem of the Macedonian Struggle

Zisis Verros (Greek: Ζήσης Βέρρος; 16 August 1880 – 10 April 1985) was a notable Greek chieftain of the Macedonian Struggle.

== Biography ==
Verros was born in Avdella on 16 August 1880. He finished school in Avdella and graduated in the famous gymnasium of Tsotyli. He worked as a teacher in Avdella from 1889 to 1900. He then joined various Macedonian guerrilla groups, operating mainly as an agent, informant and driver, collaborating with the team of the famous Pavlos Melas. In 1905, his official armed action began, working with Loukas Kokkinos, Athanasios Brufas, Georgios Tsontos and Gr. Falerea. Shortly afterwards, he set up his own independent 35-member armed group, whose he was the leader. He participated in the victorious Battle of Orliaka against Ottoman troops, where a member of his band was killed. Then, with his group, he participated in the Battle of Ezeretsi (nowadays Petropoulakio) and then in the Operation of Paleor (nowadays Foufas) against Bulgarian Komitadjis.

In 1908, with the revolution of the Young Turks, he settled in the town of Grevena, but soon he was forced to flee as the new regime dissolved penalties against the Greeks and even those who were distinguished in the Macedonian Struggle.

In 1941 he was arrested by the German Nazis and remained in prison for 2 years. His family participated in the Greek Resistance, his son Kostas at ELAS and his four daughters at EAM and EPON. During the Civil war, Verros was persecuted and jailed for two years in Kozani.

He later was awarded by the Greek government with the Black Emblem of the Macedonian Struggle and by the Panhellenic Federation of Chieftains, with the honorary diploma.

Verros died on 10 April 1985, aged 104. He was the last living comrade-in-arms of Pavlos Melas.
