= Avdella =

Village in Western Macedonia, Greece

Avdella Αβδέλλα Avdhela
- Municipal unit
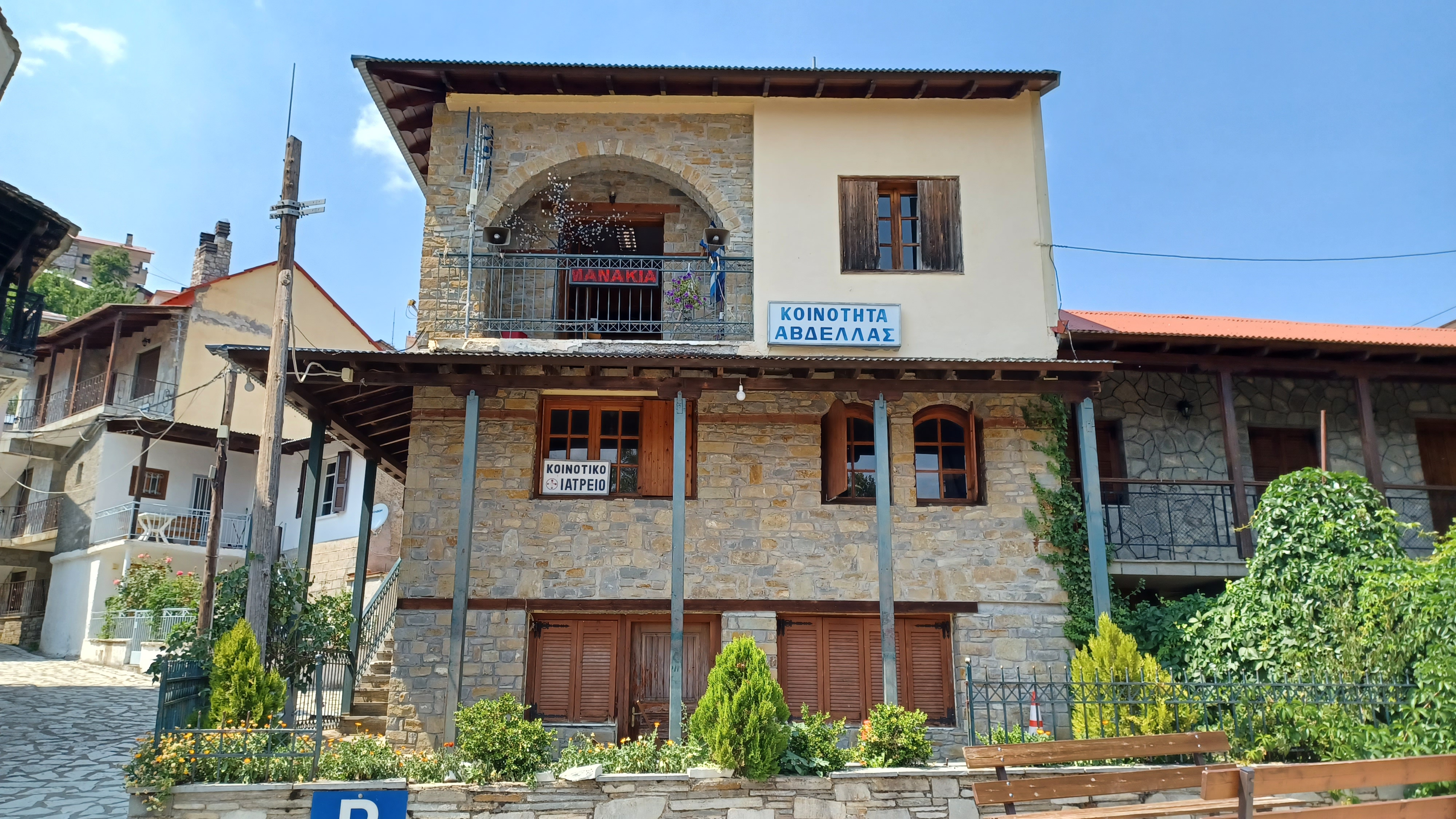
- Village hall of Avdella

- Location within the regional unit

- Location within Greece
- Coordinates: 40°01′N 21°08′E
- Country: Greece
- Administrative region: Western Macedonia
- Regional unit: Grevena
- Municipality: Grevena

Area
  - Municipal unit: 43.243 km^{2} (16.696 sq mi)
- Elevation: 1,300 m (4,300 ft)

Population (2021)
  - Municipal unit: 73
  - Municipal unit density: 1.7/km^{2} (4.4/sq mi)
- Time zone: UTC+2 (EET)
  - Summer (DST): UTC+3 (EEST)
- Postal code: 510 32
- Area code: +30-2462
- Vehicle registration: ΡΝ

Avdella (Greek: Αβδέλλα; Aromanian: Avdhela) is a village and a former municipality in Grevena regional unit, Western Macedonia, Greece. Since the 2011 local government reform, it has been a municipal unit of Grevena. It is a seasonal Aromanian (Vlach) village, which has a transhumant community. Located in the Pindus mountains at 1250–1350 metres altitude, its summer population is about 3000. In winter there are only a few residents. The 2021 census recorded 73 inhabitants. It is notable as the birthplace of the Manakis brothers, and appears in the opening sequence of the film Ulysses' Gaze. The community of Avdella covers an area of 43.243 km^{2}.

== History ==
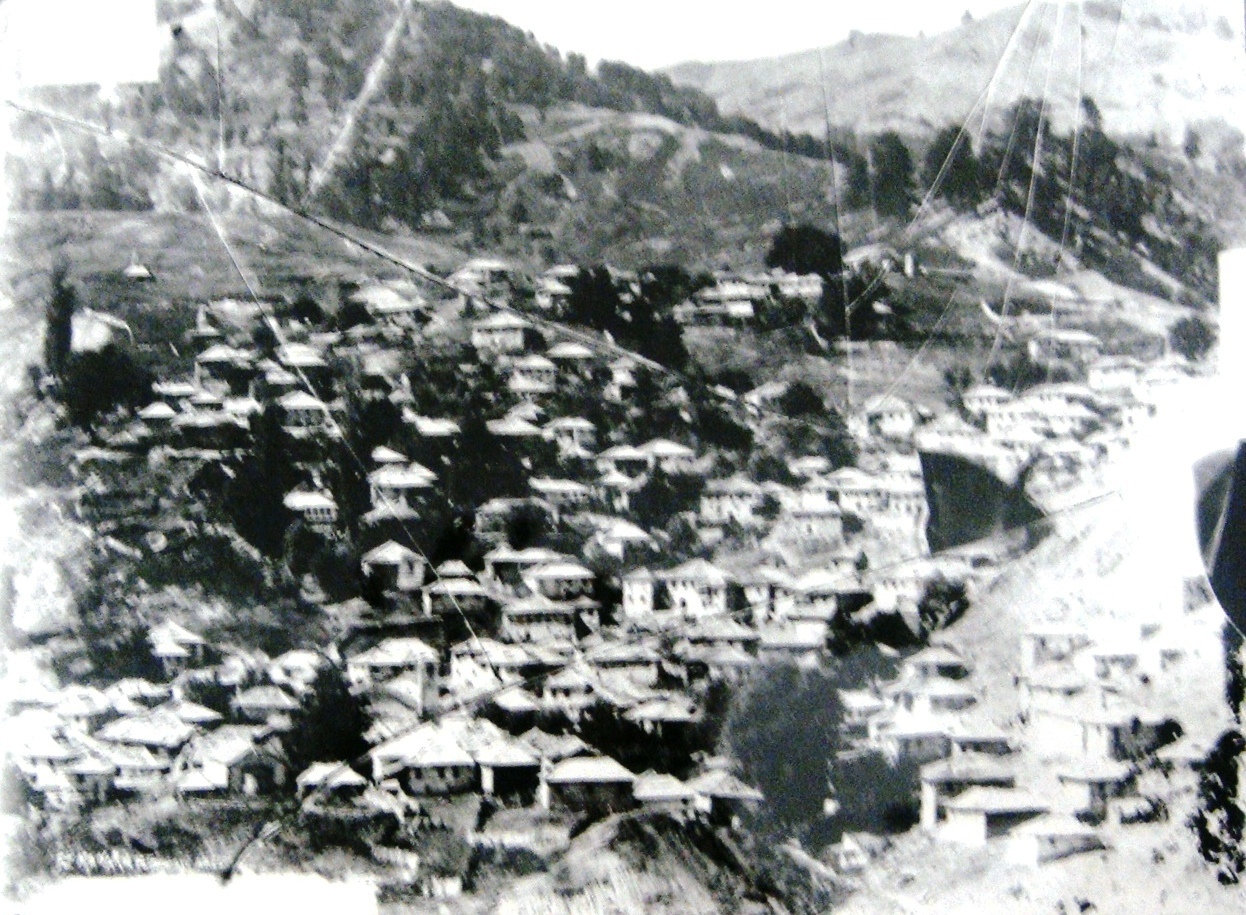
Panorama of the village Avdella. 1898. Photo taken by Manaki Brothers (Damaged glass plate)

The first foundation of Avdella remains unknown. Perhaps it was connected to the creation of settlements on the mountain range of Smolikas with the delivery of veterinary surgeon activity of region. In the beginning, Aromanian families created small family settlements which were fused and became a single settlement such as current Avdella. The foundation and the growth of Avdella is associated with the rise of livestock-farming taking into account the pastoral habits of the locals. Before 1800, the village was situated in the "Fântîne", but the residents, mostly large families of Aromanian shepherds moved to the current position due to better climate.

Under Ottoman rule, Avdella was in the kaza of Grevena, Sanjak of Serfice (modern Servia), Vilayet of Monastir (modern Bitola).

The first Romanian school in the region of modern Greece was founded in Avdella in 1867 by local Aromanian Apostol Mărgărit.

Some authors claim that Avdella was a center of pro-Romanian sentiment in the beginning of the 20th century, contributing figures such as Apostol Mărgărit. It was burned in October 1905 by Greek andartes because of this. Contributing leaders such as Zisis Verros in Macedonian Struggle were fighting for the Greek cause.

On 14 July 1944, the village was burned again by a group of German Nazis, during their retreat.

== Population ==
Historical population
Year	Pop.	±%
1928	86	—
1940	424	+393.0%
1951	6	−98.6%
1961	2	−66.7%
1971	4	+100.0%
1981	360	+8900.0%
1991	130	−63.9%
2001	12	−90.8%
2011	280	+2233.3%
2021	73	−73.9%
Source: Stamatelatos, ELSTAT

== Notable people ==
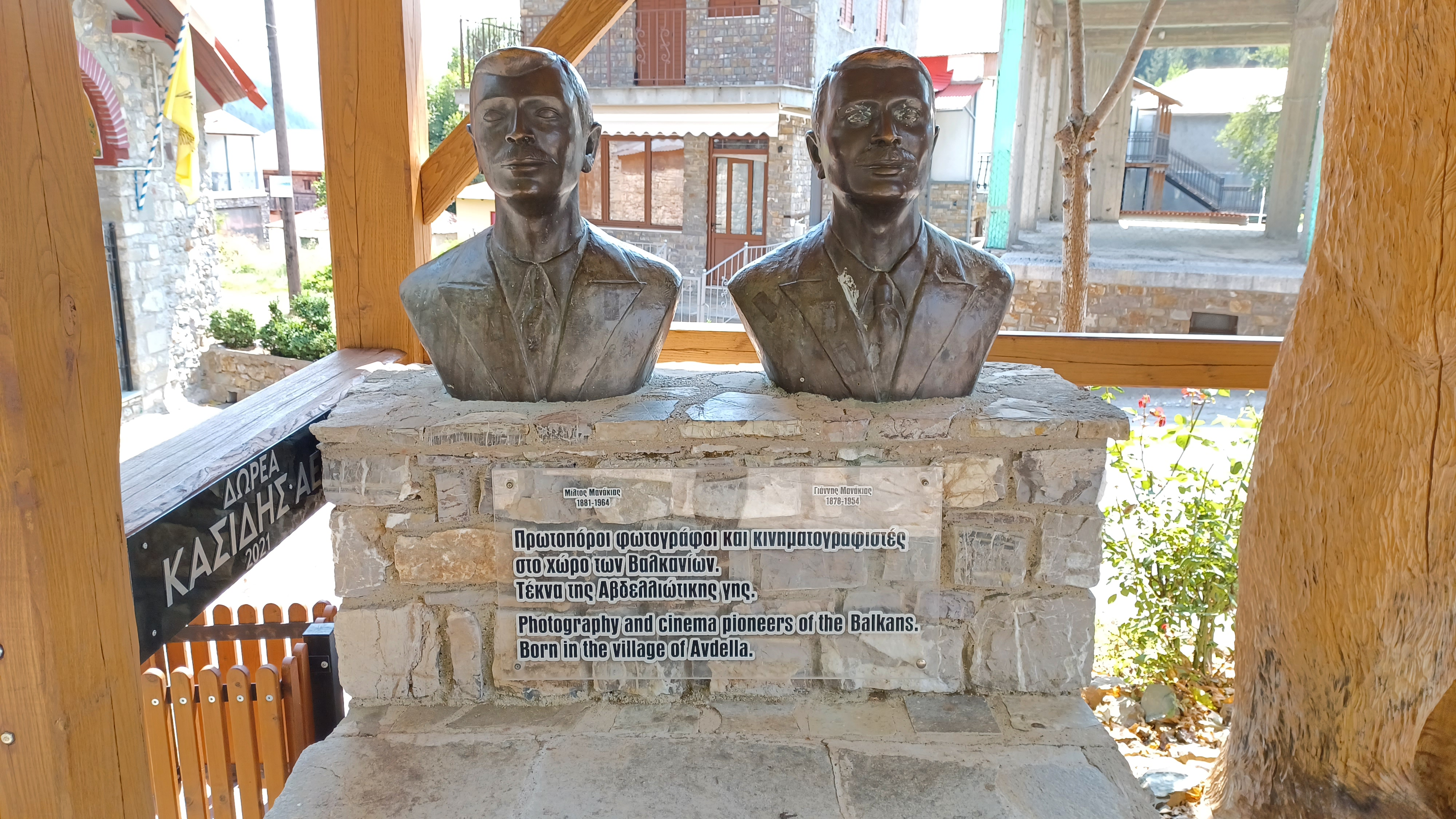
Bust of the Manaki brothers in Avdella

- Archimandrite Averchie (1806/1818–?), monk and schoolteacher
- Ioan D. Caragiani (1841–1921), folklorist and translator
- Yanaki and Milton Manaki (1872–1954 and 1882–1964), photography and cinema pioneers
- Apostol Mărgărit (1832–1903), educator and activist
- Pericle Papahagi (1872–1943), historian and folklorist
- Tache Papahagi (1892–1977), folklorist and linguist
- Nuși Tulliu (1872–1941), poet and prose writer
- Zisis Verros (1880–1985), chieftain of the Macedonian Struggle

== See also ==
- Avdhela Project, an Aromanian digital library and cultural initiative named after the Aromanian name of Avdella (Avdhela)

== See also ==
- List of settlements in the Grevena regional unit
