= Anja Hatakka =

Finnish actress (1938–2026)

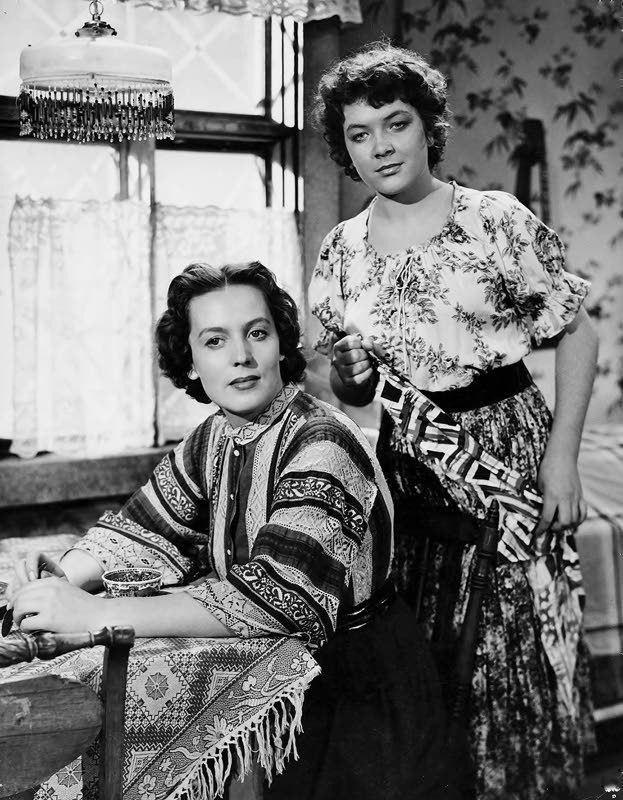
- Helena Vinkka (left) and Hatakka (right) in the 1955 film The Unknown Soldier
- Born: Anja Inkeri Hatakka; 21 February 1938; Metsäpirtti, Finland
- Died: 10 April 2026 (aged 88); Espoo, Finland
- Occupations: Actress, beauty pageant competitor
- Years active: 1955–1960

Anja Inkeri Geissbühler (née Hatakka; 21 February 1938 – 10 April 2026) was a Finnish actress and beauty pageant competitor.

== Life and career ==
Hatakka was born in the Hatakkala village Metsäpirtti, Viipuri Province. She was the youngest daughter of Aapro Hatakka (1894–1946) and Susanna Läärä (1900–1973).

She worked as a mermaid at the Mermaid Hall in the Linnanmäki amusement park in the summer of 1955. After this, she played small film roles, such as the role of Nina in the 1955 film The Unknown Soldier, directed by Edvin Laine.

Hatakka was entered into the 1958 Miss Finland competition, and in the competitions held at the Helsinki Exhibition and Convention Centre on 2 February, she became the second hereditary princess; Pirkko Mannola won the competition.

After marrying the CEO of Agfa-Gevaert, Hatakka took the new surname Geissbühler, moved to Switzerland and disappeared from the public eye. Hatakka returned to Finland and spent her final years living at a nursing home in Kauklahti, Espoo. Before her death, Hatakka was the last surviving cast member of The Unknown Soldier. She died on 10 April 2026, at the age of 88.

== Sources ==
=== Further reading ===
- Pietilä, Arto (2003). Pätkä – Masa Niemi (in Finnish). HD Kustannus.
- Suomen kansallisfilmografia 6: 1957–61 (in Finnish). VAPK. 1991.
- "Kaunottaria kilpanäyttämöllä: artikkeli Miss Suomi -kilpailuista". Eeva (in Finnish) (3). Helsinki: A-lehdet Oy. 1958.
