= Ioan D. Caragiani =

Romanian folklorist and translator

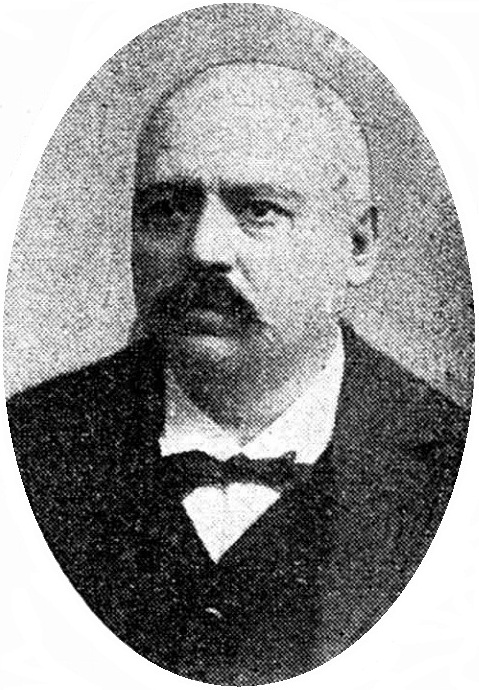
Ioan D. Caragiani

Ioan D. Caragiani (11 February 1841 – 13 January 1921) was a Romanian folklorist and translator. He was one of the founding members of the Romanian Academy. Caragiani was an Aromanian. He was a member of the Macedo-Romanian Cultural Society.
