= Saligny =

Saligny is a proper name that could be associated with some villages in France or with a family of Romanian intellectuals of French origin.

== Romanian Surnames ==
- Alfons Oscar Saligny (1853 - 1903), member of the Romanian Academy, Romanian chemist, educator, brother of Anghel Saligny
- Alfred Saligny, Romanian educator of French origin, father of Alfons Oscar Saligny and Anghel Saligny
- Anghel Saligny (1854 - 1925), member of the Romanian Academy, its president between 1907 and 1910, Romanian construction engineer, educator, professor, inventor

== Places in France ==
Saligny is the name or part of the name of several communes in France:

- Saligny, Vendée, in the Vendée département
- Saligny, Yonne, in the Yonne département
- Saligny-le-Vif, in the Cher département
- Saligny-sur-Roudon, in the Allier département
- Saligny-le-Roudon, in the Allier département

== Places in Romania ==
- Saligny, Constanța, a commune in Constanţa County
