= Palas Tunnel =

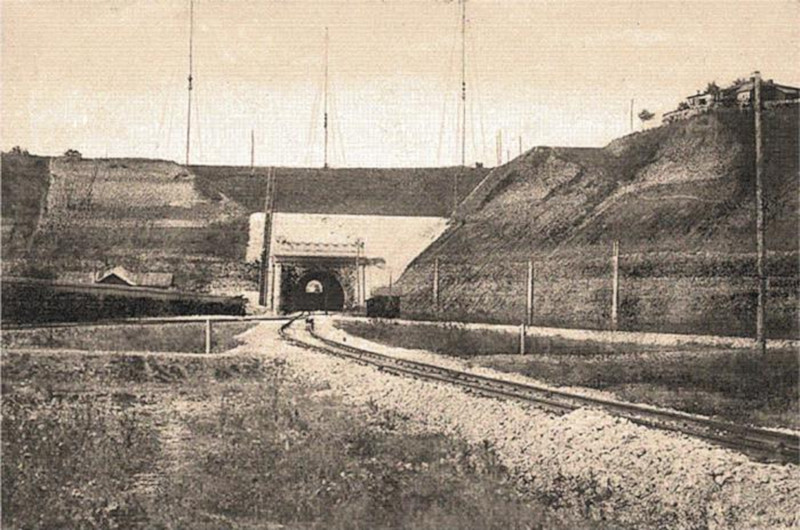
- Carol I (Palas) Tunnel on inauguration (1900)

Overview
- Other names: Carol I Tunnel, Saligny Tunnel
- Location: Constanța, Romania
- Coordinates: 44.165757°N 28.634557°E
- Status: Abandoned

Operation
- Opened: 1900
- Closed: 1992
- Owner: CFR
- Operator: CFR
- Character: Freight

Technical
- Design engineer: Anghel Saligny
- Length: 490 m (1,610 ft)
- No. of tracks: 2
- Track gauge: 1,435 mm (4 ft 8 1/2 in) standard gauge
- Electrified: No
- Tunnel clearance: 6.15 m (20.2 ft)
- Width: 8.36 m (27.4 ft)

Route map
- Palas tunnel

Palas Tunnel is a disused railway tunnel in Constanța, Romania. Originally named “Carol I”, the railway tunnel served as freight trains access to the Port of Constanța for almost a century.

== Construction and service ==
The tunnel was built during 1896-1900 by the renown Romanian engineer Anghel Saligny, it is 490 meters long, 8.36 meters in width, 6.15 meters in height and it featured two railway lines. It was constructed using of a lining of bricks and mortar and reinforced by a concrete slab, with foundation on a bed of stone. The tunnel walls sports a series of safety alcoves on every 20 meters, those were used by the maintenance personnel while the trains passed through the tunnel. The tunnel went under extensive repair works in 1965.

By 1970, the new electrified railway to the Port of Constanța was in operation and Palas Tunnel freight traffic dropped considerably. It was kept in operation until 1992, when, after some heavy rains, the tunnel was flooded. Palas Tunnel remained abandoned and unmaintained for the next 19 years.

== Current status ==
In 2011, following fears of structural issues that could endanger the buildings in the area above the tunnel (including 10 story apartment blocks) CFR - the Romanian state railway carrier, decided to run repairs on the tunnel. The work was carried out during summer of 2012, the structural integrity was verified, the tunnel was drained and the railway lines were removed. No other work was done and the tunnel is currently sealed with metal fences on both ends.

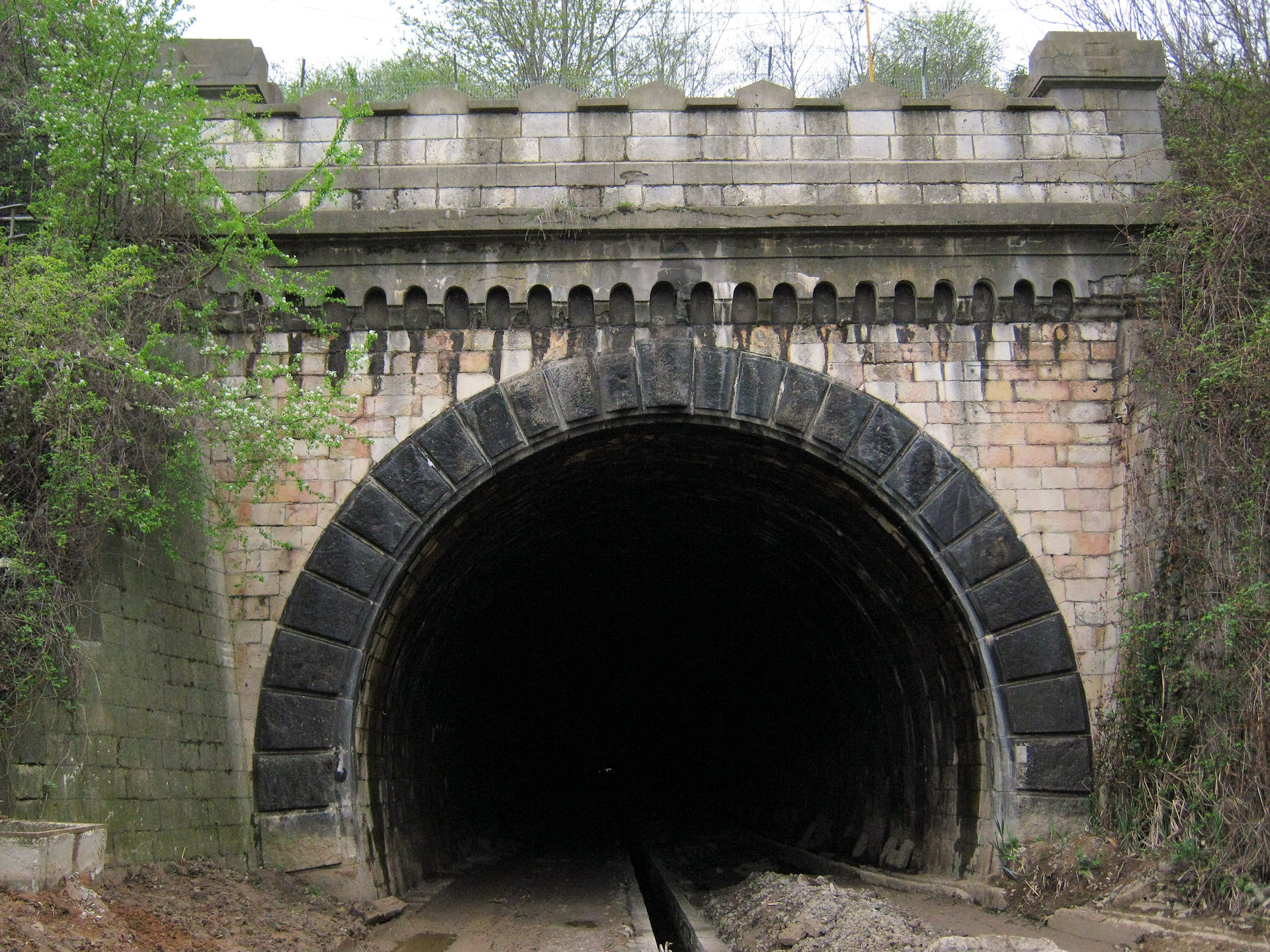
Eastern portal to Palas Tunnel (April 2012)

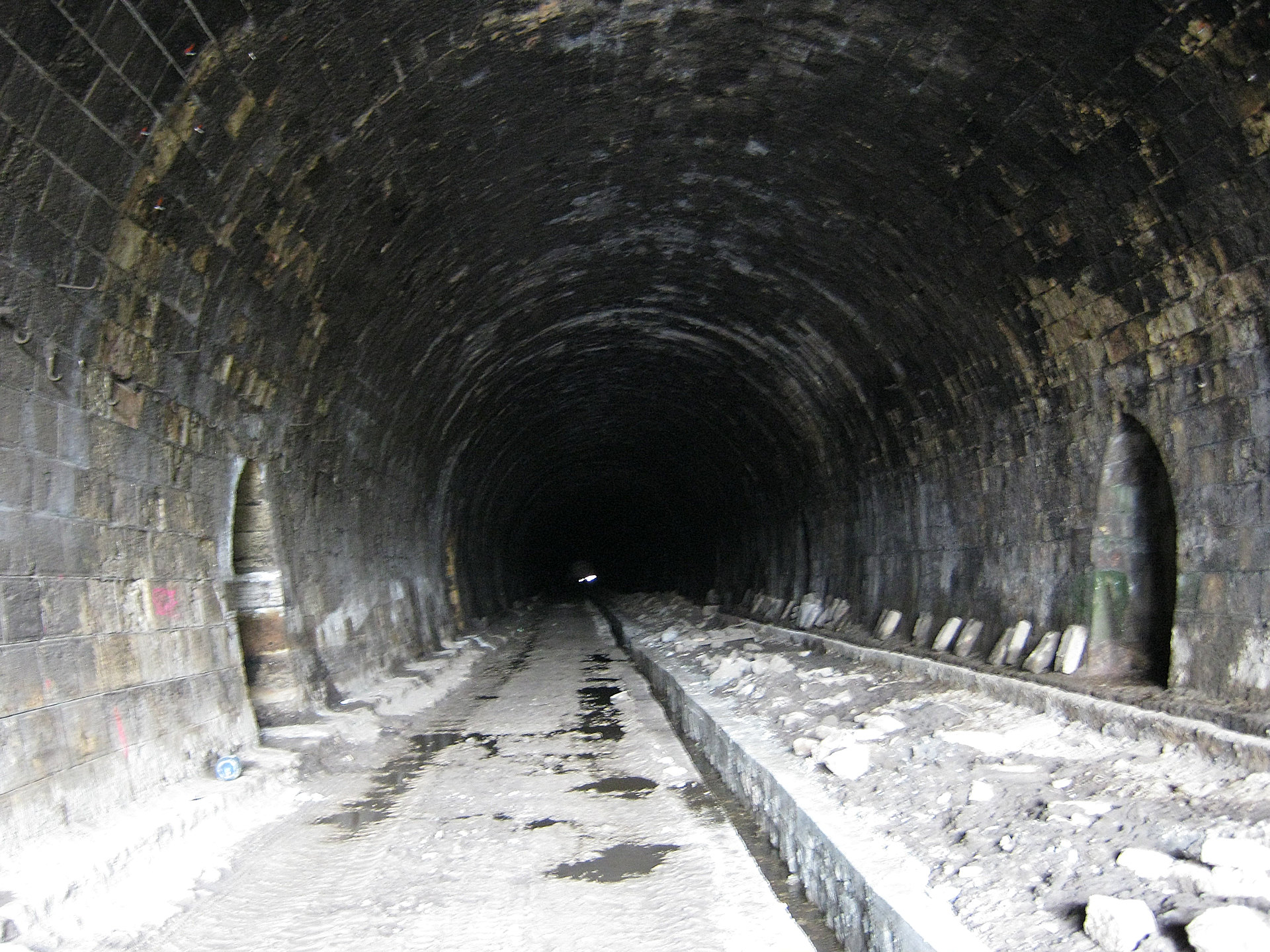
Inside Palas Tunnel (April 2012)
