= Băltăreți =

Băltăreți may refer to several villages in Romania:

- Băltăreți, a village in Ulmeni, Buzău
- Băltăreți, a village in Cosmești, Galați
