= Dumitru Dămăceanu =

Romanian army officer

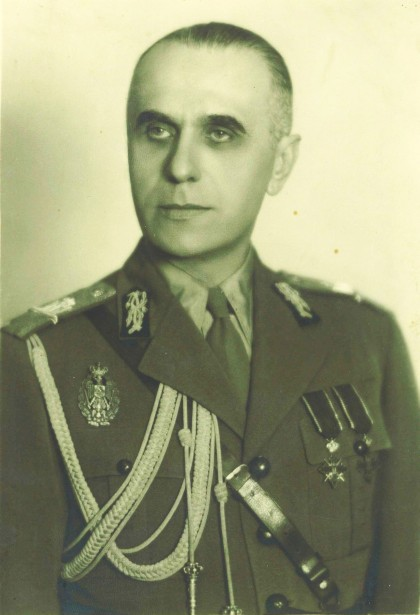
- General Dumitru Dămăceanu, 1945
- Born: July 17, 1896; Cosmești, Galați County, Kingdom of Romania
- Died: September 27, 1978 (aged 82); Bucharest, Socialist Republic of Romania
- Education: Infantry Officer School in Sibiu; Military Academy of Turin
- Spouse: Georgeta Stroescu
- Military career
- Allegiance: Romanian Army
- Branch: Infantry
- Rank: Major general
- Conflicts: World War I; Romanian campaign; World War II
- Awards: Order of Michael the Brave; Order of the Star of Romania

Dumitru Dămăceanu (17 July 1896 – 27 September 1978) was a Romanian army officer in World War II, later promoted to brigadier-general, who played a predominant role in the royal coup of August 23, 1944.

== Military and diplomatic career ==
=== Before World War II ===
Dămăceanu was born in the village of Cosmești, in Galați County, Romania. He attended the Costache Negruzzi Boarding High School of Iași, and then the Military School for Cavalry Officers in Târgoviște, graduating in 1916 with the rank of second lieutenant. He then fought in the Romanian campaign of World War I with the 6th Regiment Roșiori. After the war, he pursued his military education at Infantry Officer School in Sibiu (1923) and the Military Academy of Turin (1929).

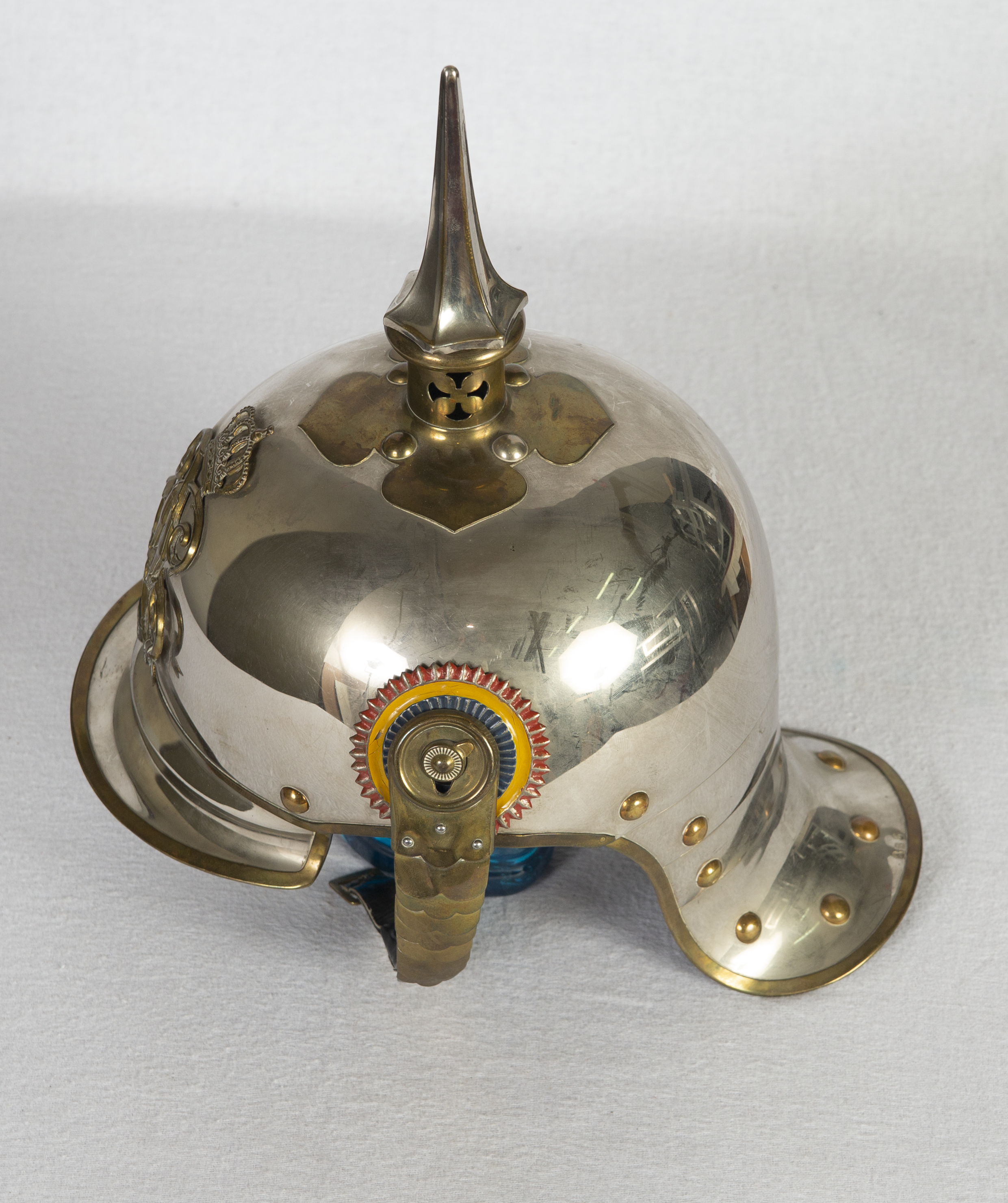
Pickelhaube helmet worn by Dămăceanu as military attaché to Italy and Albania

In between the world wars, he was military attaché in Rome, Italy, director at the Voievodul Mihai School, and adjutant to King Carol II. He was promoted to lieutenant colonel in 1938 and colonel in 1940.

=== During World War II ===
From 1941 to 1942 he was commanding officer of the 10th Roșiori Cavalry Regiment, fighting on the Eastern Front. From 1942 to 1944 he was Chief of Staff of the Capital Military Command. He was awarded the Order of Michael the Brave, 3rd class in October 1941 and the Order of the Star of Romania, Officer class, in July 1942.

==== August 23, 1944 coup d'état ====
Colonel Dămăceanu participated in the August 23, 1944 coup d'état led by King Michael I against the government of Marshal Ion Antonescu. He organized and coordinated the military actions and resistance in Bucharest. On August 29, he was promoted to brigadier general. By the end of August 1944, he travelled to Moscow with a Romanian delegation; they were received by Soviet Foreign Minister Vyacheslav Molotov on August 30 or 31. On September 12, 1944, General Dămăceanu was one of the plenipotentiary signatories of the Armistice Agreement between Romania and the Soviet Union (the other signatories were Lucrețiu Pătrășcanu, Ghiță Popp, and Barbu Știrbey on the Romanian side, and Rodion Malinovsky on the Soviet side).

=== Paris Peace Conference ===
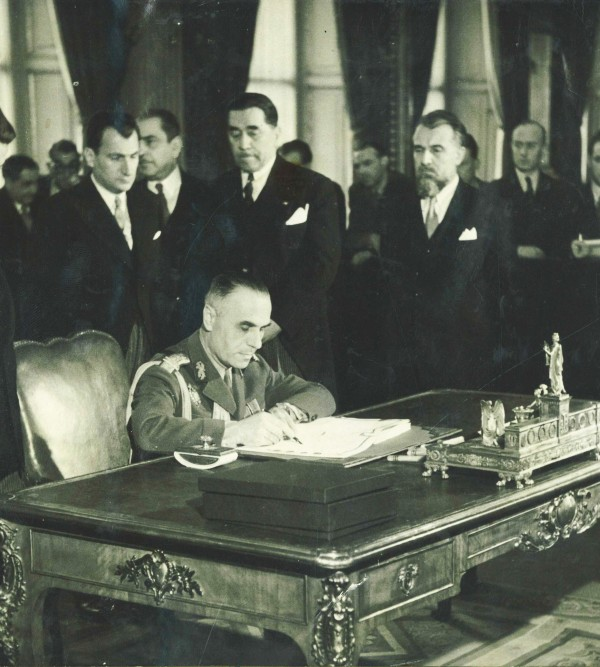
Gen. Dumitru Dămăceanu signing the Paris Peace Treaties, 1947 February 10

In 1946, he was a member of the Gheorghe Tătărescu-led Romanian delegation to the Paris World War II Peace Conference. The Peace Treaty with Romania was signed in Paris on February 10, 1947, in the Salon de l'Horloge of the Ministère des Affaires Étrangères. On the Romanian side, the four signatories were Gheorghe Tătărescu (Council Vice-President), Lucrețiu Pătrășcanu (Minister of Justice), Ștefan Voitec (Minister of National Education), and Dămăceanu (Under-Secretary – Ministry of War). Other signatories included James F. Byrnes (US Secretary of State, for the United States), Vyacheslav Molotov (Foreign Affairs Minister, for the Soviet Union), and Ernest Bevin (Foreign Affairs Secretary, for the United Kingdom).

=== 1944–1947 ===
In August 1946 he advanced in rank to major general. Later on, Dămăceanu was promoted to colonel general.

From August 23, 1944, to December 30, 1947, he was Under-Secretary of State at the Ministry of Interior, Council of Ministers, Ministry of War-Land Forces.

=== Under the communist regime ===
==== Persecution ====
After King Michael's forced abdication on December 30, 1947 and the complete Communist takeover, Dămăceanu was removed from the army. During the early 1950s he was degraded, arrested, tried and sentenced to serve time in prison.

==== Rehabilitation ====
After being released, during the 1960s, he was rehabilitated, receiving back his military rank – as a reserve officer in the new socialist army. In 1974 he was promoted from the rank of colonel general to that of army general by presidential decree. The gymnasium in Cosmești now bears his name, as does a street in his native town.

== Private life ==
In 1932 he married Georgeta Stroescu (born October 1912, died March 1996), and they had a daughter, Gabriela Romana Dămăceanu, born in May 1938 in Rome, Italy, while he was a military attaché.
