= SOCEP Constanța =

Romanian port operator

SOCEP Constanta
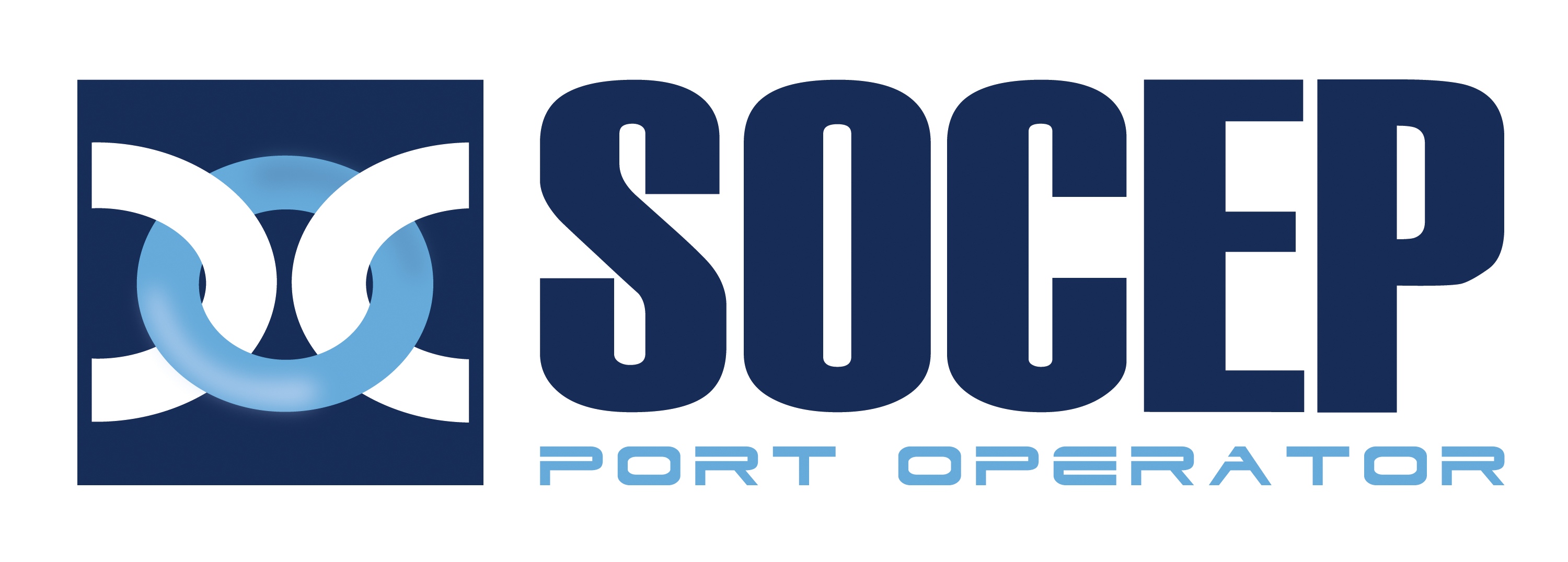
- Company type: Private company (BSE: SOCP)
- Industry: Port operator of the Port of Constanţa
- Founded: 1991
- Headquarters: Port of Constanţa, Romania, Constanţa
- Key people: Daniel Lintes (President)
- Website: www.socep.ro

SOCEP Constanţa (Socep S.A. or Socep) (BSE: SOCP) is a port operator of the Port of Constanţa in Romania. The company was established in 1991 and specializes in stevedoring services and the development of container and steel materials. Having been fully privatized in 1996, Socep is one of the largest port operators in Romania.

Socep's activity centers around two operating terminals — a container terminal (300,000 TEU – annual operating capacity) and a general cargo terminal (3 million tons – annual operating capacity). The company's terminal in Constanţa is one of the oldest terminals and is the second largest in terms of volume of shipments.

Socep's major shareholders are Grupul DD Constanța (31.32%) and millionaire Stere Samara (10.52%).

== Main services ==
1. Containers vessel/shore operations;
2. Dry bulk cargo vessel/shore operations;
3. Break bulk cargo vessel/shore operations;
4. Containers stuffing/stripping any cargo type;
5. Containers storage area;
6. Reefer containers storage points;
7. Break bulk and bulk cargo storage in warehouses and open platforms;
8. Refrigerated warehouse for fresh fruit storage;
9. Cargo lashing;
10. Sorting and labeling;
11. Bulk cargo bagging;
12. Dangerous goods handling/storage.

== Main operated cargo ==
- Containers;
- Dry bulk products :
1. Fertilizers
2. Alumina
3. Cereals
4. Raw sugar
5. Coke
6. Sulfur
7. Ores
8. Scrap metal
- Break bulk products:
1. Metallurgical products
2. Bagged goods
3. Timber products
4. Paper
5. Fresh fruits
6. Heavy lift projects

== Turnover ==
- 2009: 45,8 million Romanian leu
- 2008: 58,8 million Romanian leu
- 2007: 44 million Romanian leu
- 2006: 39,1 million Romanian leu
