= Saligny, Constanța =

Saligny
- Commune
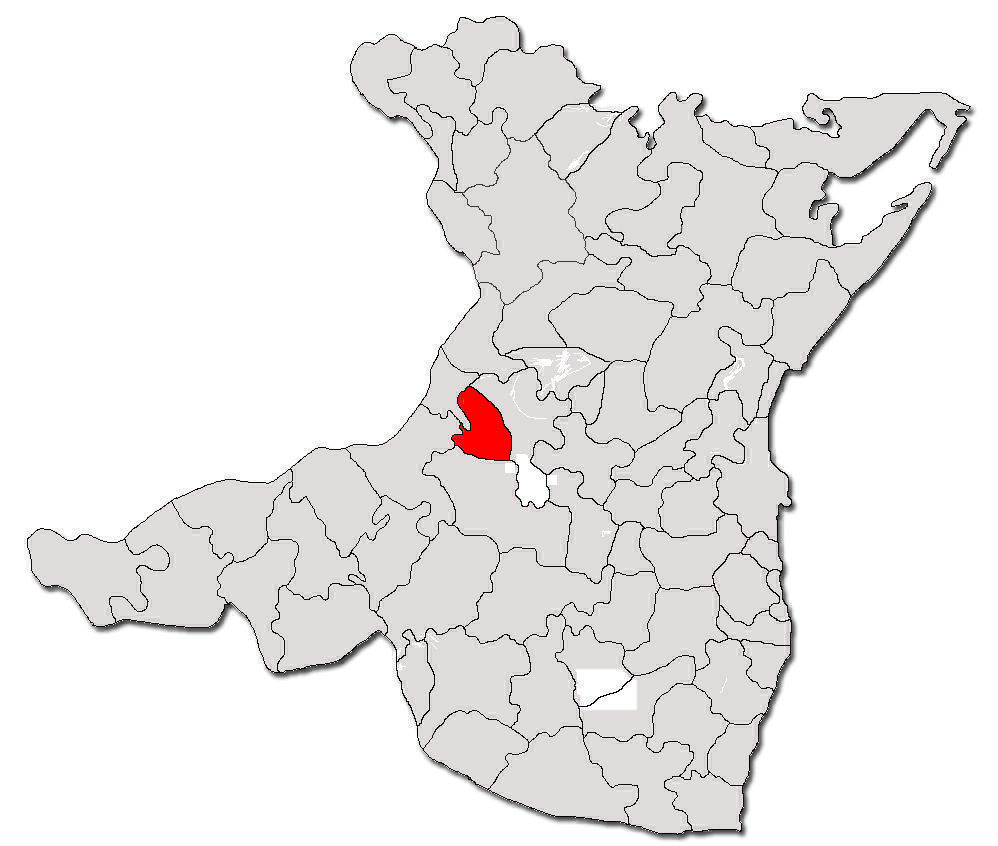
- Location in Constanța County

- Location in Romania
- Coordinates: 44°17′N 28°5′E
- Country: Romania
- County: Constanța
- Subdivisions: Saligny, Făclia, Ștefan cel Mare

Government
  - Mayor (2020–2024): Ion Beiu (PSD)
- Area: 35.27 km^{2} (13.62 sq mi)
- Elevation: 40 m (130 ft)
- Population (2021-12-01): 2,058
  - Density: 58.35/km^{2} (151.1/sq mi)
- Time zone: UTC+02:00 (EET)
  - Summer (DST): UTC+03:00 (EEST)
- Postal code: 907203
- Area code: +(40) x30
- Vehicle reg.: CT
- Website: www.primariasaligny.ro

Saligny (Romanian pronunciation: [saˈliɲi]) is a commune in Constanța County, Northern Dobruja, Romania.

The commune includes three villages:

- Saligny (historical name: Aziza, Azizia) – named after the Romanian engineer Anghel Saligny
- Făclia (historical name: Facria until 1925)
- Ștefan cel Mare (historical name: Bazaschioi) – named after the Moldavian prince Stephen the Great

Saligny is located in the western part of the county, along the Danube–Black Sea Canal.

== Demographics ==
Historical population
| Year | Pop. | ±% |
|---|---|---|
| 2002 | 2,350 | — |
| 2011 | 2,158 | −8.2% |
| 2021 | 2,058 | −4.6% |
Source: Census data

At the 2011 census, Saligny had 2,158 inhabitants; of those, 96% were Romanians. At the 2021 census, the commune had a population of 2,058, of which 86.64% were Romanians.
