= Constanța South Container Terminal =

Container terminal in Romania

Constanța South Container Terminal CSCT
- Company type: Private
- Industry: Transport, Terminals
- Founded: 2004
- Headquarters: Port of Constanţa, Romania
- Key people: Mohammed Sharaf (CEO)
- Revenue: ▲$60 million USD
- Number of employees: 550
- Website: http://www.csct.ro

Constanța South Container Terminal (CSCT) (Romanian: Terminalul de containere Constanţa Sud) is located in the Port of Constanţa, 170 nautical miles (310 km) from the Bosphorus Strait and 250 kilometres (160 mi) from Romania's capital Bucharest. It is the largest container terminal in the Black Sea area having an annual traffic capacity of 1,500,000 twenty-foot equivalent unit (TEUs). Located on a plot of land of 31 hectares (0.31 km^{2}) the terminal has an additional 39 hectares (0.39 km^{2}) for expansion that would increase the traffic up to 4,500,000 TEUs. The container terminal is currently under expansion as of August 2009. The expansion will add another 10 hectares (0.10 km^{2}) of storage space and increase the quay length by 510 m (1,670 ft). After the expansion the terminal will be capable of handling around 1,700,000 TEUs. The terminal is owned by the Dubai based company Dubai Ports World.

== Terminal facilities ==
The CSCT has a traffic capacity of 1,500,000 TEUs and an available storage area of 31 ha (0.31 km^{2}) and a total quay length of 1,045 m (3,428 ft) divided into two berths: the main berth has 634 m (2,080 ft) in length and the feeder berth has 411 m (1,348 ft). The berths have a depth between 14.5 m (48 ft) and 16.5 m (54 ft) and are equipped with 5 Post-Panamax cranes and 3 mobile harbour cranes.

The CSCT also has a rail terminal with 3 lines, each 600 m (2,000 ft) long capable of handling 3 complete 30 wagon trains at one time and equipped with 2 rail mounted gantries and a storage area of 5,000 square metres (54,000 ft^{2}).
