= Urechești, Bacău =

Urechești
- Commune
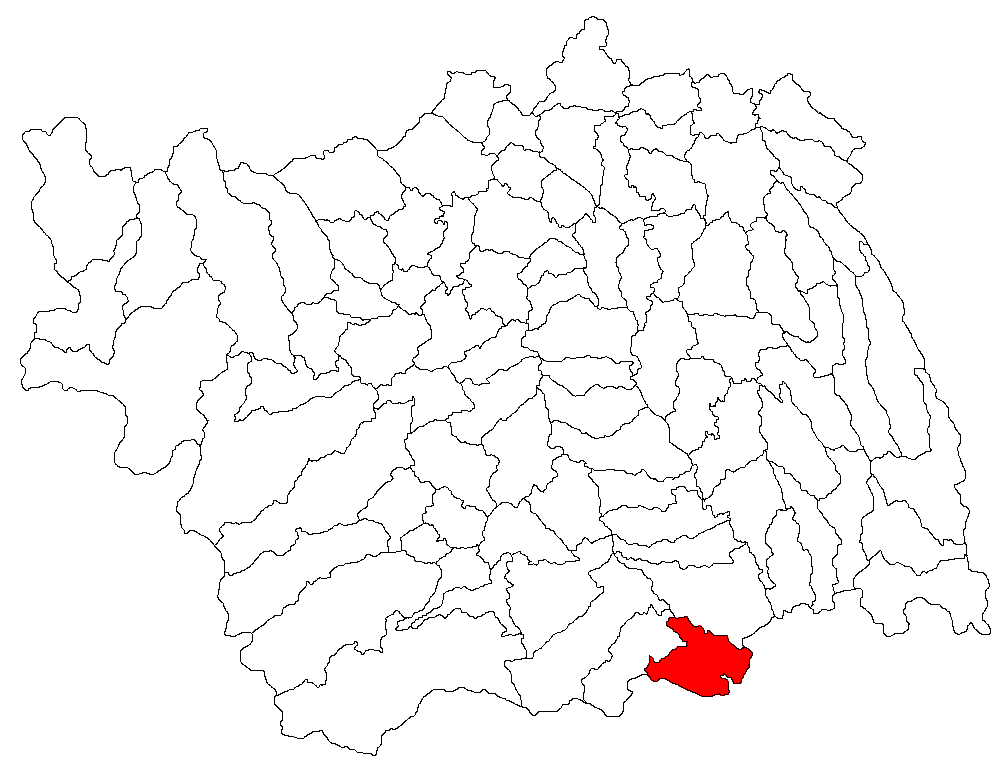
- Location in Bacău County

- Location in Romania
- Coordinates: 46.1288°N 27.0748°E
- Country: Romania
- County: Bacău

Government
  - Mayor (2024–2028): Neculai Stoica (ADU)
- Area: 61.76 km^{2} (23.85 sq mi)
- Elevation: 131 m (430 ft)
- Population (2021-12-01): 3,359
  - Density: 54.39/km^{2} (140.9/sq mi)
- Time zone: UTC+02:00 (EET)
  - Summer (DST): UTC+03:00 (EEST)
- Postal code: 607655
- Area code: +(40) 0234
- Vehicle reg.: BC
- Website: primaria-urechesti.ro

Urechești is a commune in Bacău County, Western Moldavia, Romania. It is composed of five villages: Cornățel, Lunca Dochiei, Satu Nou, Slobozia, and Urechești.
