= Port of Constanța =

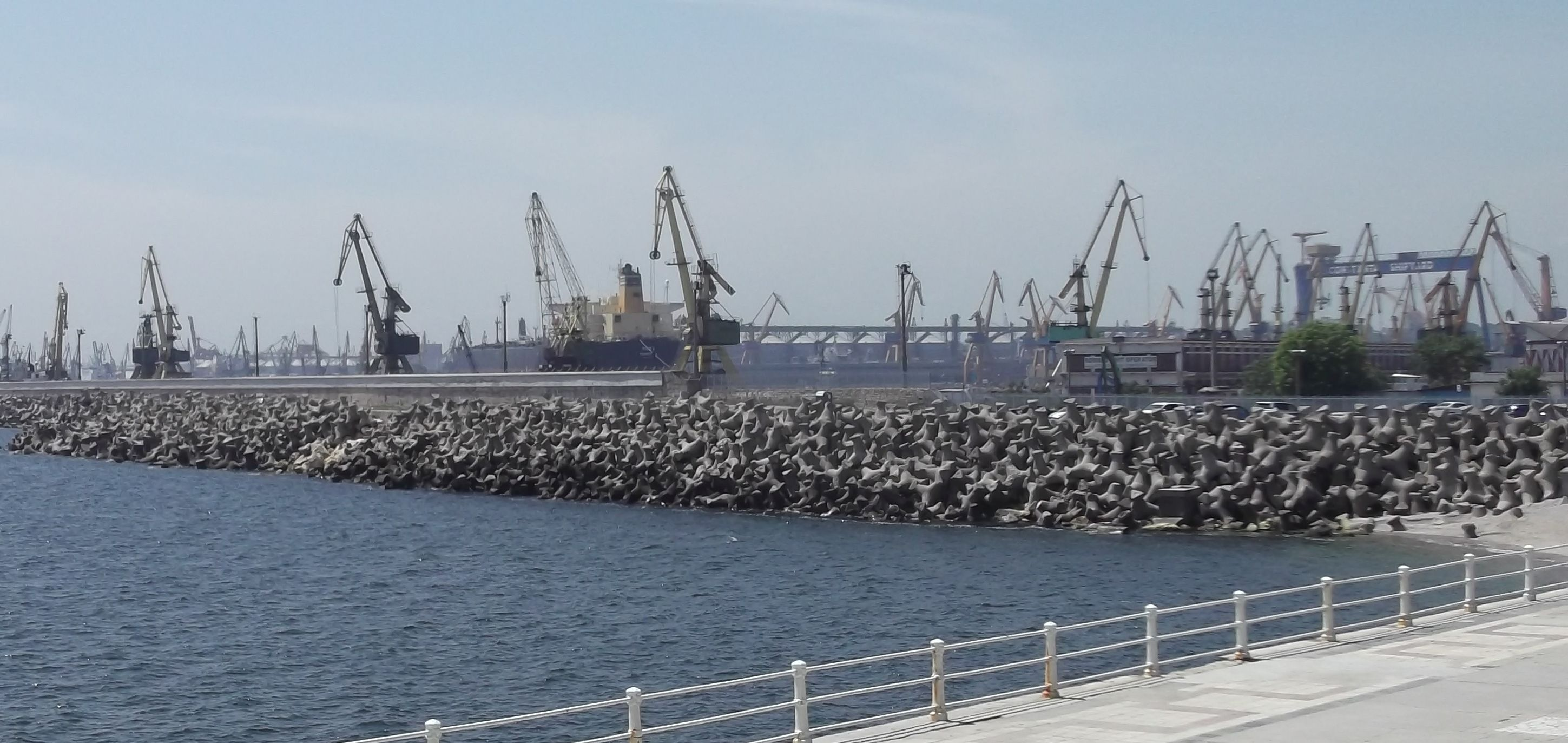
- Interactive map of Port of Constanța

Location
- Country: Romania
- Location: Constanța County
- Coordinates: 44°10′24″N 28°38′18″E
- UN/LOCODE: ROCND

Details
- Opened: 1909
- Owned by: Compania Naționalǎ Administrația Porturilor Maritime Constanța
- Type of Harbor: Natural/Artificial
- Size of harbour: 26.13 km^{2} (10.09 sq mi)
- Land area: 12.13 km^{2} (4.68 sq mi)
- Size: 38.26 km^{2} (14.77 sq mi)
- No. of berths: 146
- No. of piers: 27
- Employees: 6,000
- General manager: Constantin Matei

Statistics
- Vessel arrivals: 19,319 (2023)
- Annual cargo tonnage: 92,693,915 tonnes (2023)
- Annual container volume: 989,795 TEU's (2024)
- Value of cargo: US$ 6 billion
- Passenger traffic: 69,910 people
- Annual revenue: US$ 160 million
- Net income: US$ 14 million
- Website www.portofconstantza.com

The Port of Constanța is located in Constanța, Romania, on the western coast of the Black Sea, 179 nautical miles (332 km) from the Bosphorus Strait and 85 nmi (157 km) from the Sulina Branch, through which the Danube river flows into the sea. It covers 3,926 ha (9,700 acres), of which 1,313 ha (3,240 acres) is land and the rest, 2,613 ha (6,460 acres) is water. The two breakwaters located northwards and southwards shelter the port, creating the safest conditions for port activities. The present length of the north breakwater is 8,344 m (5.185 mi) and the south breakwater is 5,560 m (3.45 mi). The Port of Constanța is the largest on the Black Sea and the 17th largest in Europe.

The favourable geographical position and the importance of the Port of Constanța is emphasized by the connection with two Pan-European transport corridors: IV (high speed railway&highway) and the Pan-European Corridor VII (Danube). The two satellite ports, Midia and Mangalia, located not far from Constanța Port, are part of the Romanian maritime port system under the coordination of the Maritime Ports Administration SA.

== History ==
The history of the port is closely related to the history of Constanța. Although Constanța was founded in the 2nd century AD the old Greek colony of Tomis was founded in the 6th century BC. The port-city was organised as an emporium to ease the trade between the Greeks and the local peoples. The Greek influence is maintained until the 1st century BC, when the territory between the Danube and the Black Sea was occupied by the Romans. The first years of Roman governorate were recorded by Ovid, who was exiled to Tomis for unknown reasons. In the next hundred years the port had a substantial development and the city changes its name to Constanța in honour of the Roman Emperor Constantine I.

In the Byzantine period the evolution of the port is halted due to the frequent invasions by the migratory people, the trade was fading and the traders were looking for other more secure markets like Venice or Genoa but many constructions in the port maintain the name genovese in the memory of the merchants from the Italian city. After a brief period when the port was under Romanian rule, the Dobruja region was occupied by the Ottoman Empire. In 1857, the Turkish authorities leased the port and the Cernavodă–Constanța Railway to the British company Danube and Black Sea Railway and Kustendge Harbour Company Ltd.

The construction of the port began on October 16, 1896, when King Carol I set the first stepping stone for the construction and modernization of the port. The construction works were started with the help of Romanian engineer I. B. Cantacuzino, and the later developments were attributed to Gheorghe Duca and Anghel Saligny. The port was finished and first opened in 1909 and had adequate facilities for that time, with 6 storage basins, a number of oil reservoirs, and grain silos. With these facilities, the port operated 1.4 million tons of cargo in 1911. Between the two World Wars, the port was equipped with a corn drier and a floating dock; a new building for the port administration was built and a stock exchange was established. In 1937, the amount of cargo handled was 6,200,000 tonnes (6,100,000 long tons; 6,800,000 short tons).

Starting with 1967, the port was expanded to the south. The construction of the Danube–Black Sea Canal, which opened in 1984, had a major role in the development of the port. After the opening of the canal, the port grew very fast and after two decades it covered an area of 3,900 hectares (9,600 acres). The height of cargo traffic was achieved in 1988, when the port handled 62,200,000 tonnes (61,200,000 long tons; 68,600,000 short tons) of cargo. After the Romanian Revolution of 1989, the port faded in importance for the Romanian economy, traffic was dwindling and in 2000 the port registered its lowest traffic since World War II of 30 million tonnes of cargo. The traffic started growing again after 2003 and reached a record 61,838,000 tonnes (60,861,000 long tons; 68,165,000 short tons) in 2008, the second largest cargo traffic in the history of the port. The most recent terminals entered in service in 2004 (container terminal), 2005 (passenger terminal) and 2006 (barge terminal).

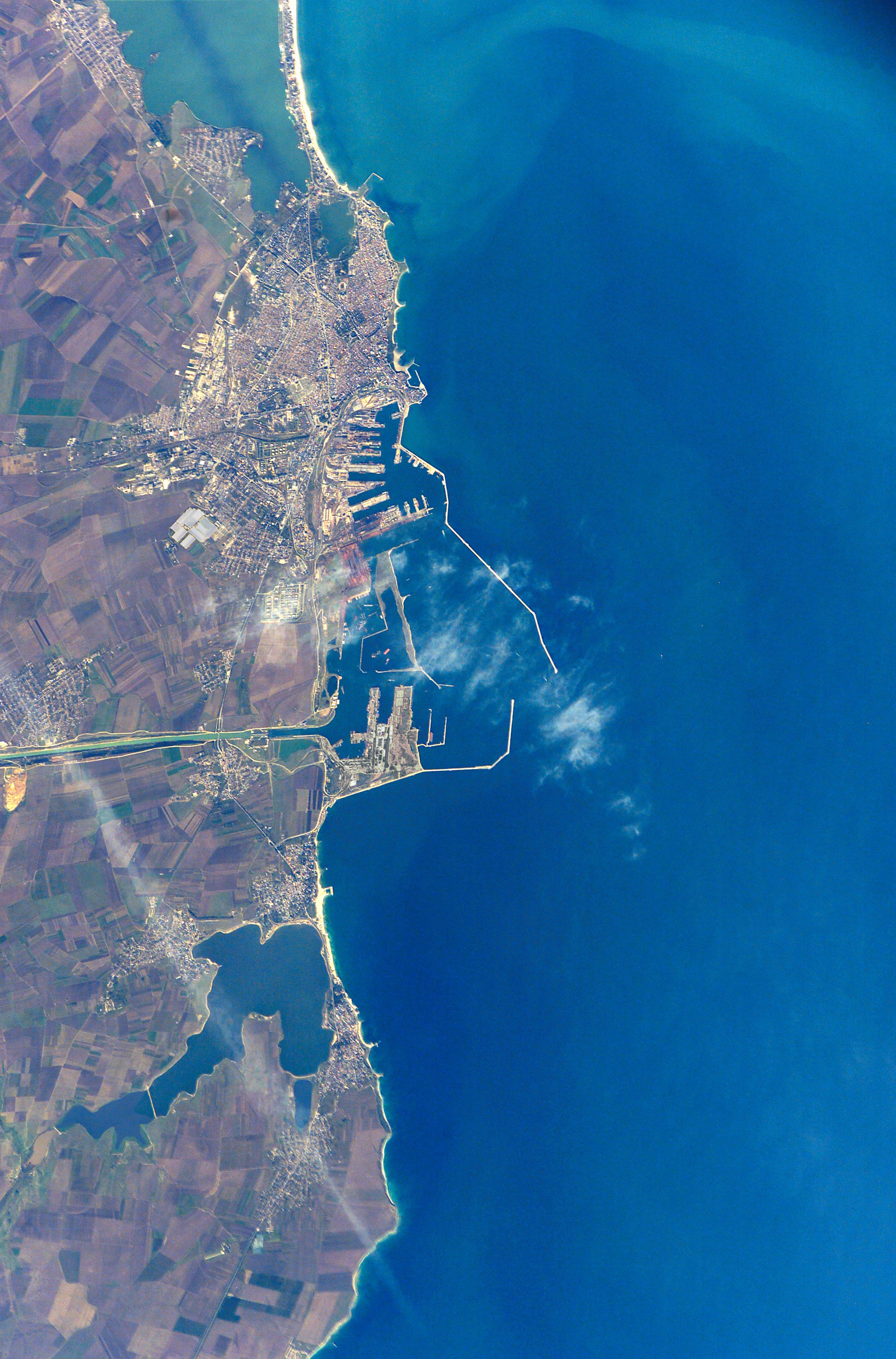
Constanţa from space, October 2002

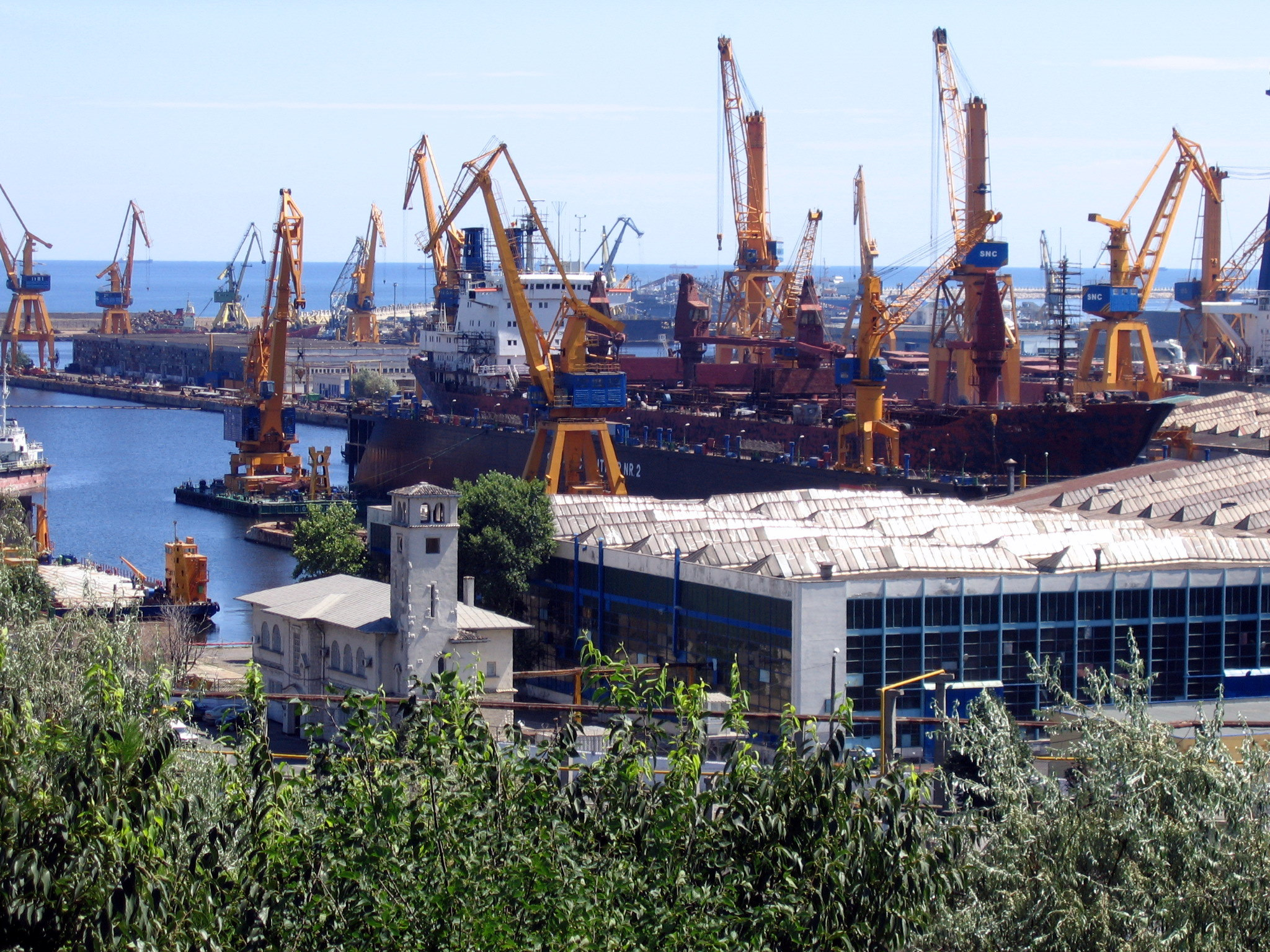
Constanţa Shipyard

== Operations ==
Constanța Port has a handling capacity of 100,000,000 tonnes (98,000,000 long tons; 110,000,000 short tons) per year and 156 berths, of which 140 berths are operational. The total quay length is 29.83 kilometres (18.54 mi), and the depths range between 8 and 19 meters. These characteristics are comparable with those offered by the most important European and international ports, allowing the accommodation of tankers with a capacity of 165,000 tonnes deadweight (DWT) and bulkcarriers of 220,000 DWT.

Constanța Port is both a maritime and a river port. Daily, more than 200 river vessels are in the port for cargo loading or unloading or waiting to be operated. The connection of the port with the Danube river is made through the Danube–Black Sea Canal, which represents one of the main strengths of Constanța Port. Important cargo quantities are carried by river, between Constanta and Central and Eastern European countries: Bulgaria, Serbia, Hungary, Austria, Slovakia and Germany. River traffic is very important for the Constanța Port, having a share of 23.3% of the total traffic in 2005, when 8,800 river vessels called to the port.

== Connections ==
The rail network in the Port of Constanța is connected to the Romanian and European rail network, with the Port of Constanța being a starting and terminus point for Corridor IV, a Pan-European corridor. Round-the-clock train services carry high volumes of cargo to the most important economic areas of Romania and Eastern Europe, the Port of Constanța being also an important transport node of the TRACECA Corridor, providing the connection between Europe, Caucasus and Central Asia. The total length of railways in the port amounts to 300 km (190 mi).

The ten gates of the Port of Constanța are connected with the Romanian and European road network via DN39 and DN39A national roads and the A4 motorway. The connection with Corridor IV has a strategic importance, linking the Port of Constanța with the landlocked countries from Central and Eastern Europe. Constantza port is also located close to Corridor IX, passing through Bucharest. The total length of roads in the port amounts to 100 km (62 mi).

The oil terminal has seven operational jetties. Jetties allow berthage for vessels up to 165,000 DWT capacity. Connection between storage farms and jetties is done by a 15 km (9.3 mi) underground and overground pipelines network. Pipelines total length is 50 km (31 mi). The Port of Constanța is connected to the national pipeline system and to the main Romanian refineries. The port is also a starting and terminus point for the Pan-European Pipeline designed to the transportation of Russian and Caspian oil to Central Europe.

== Satellite ports ==
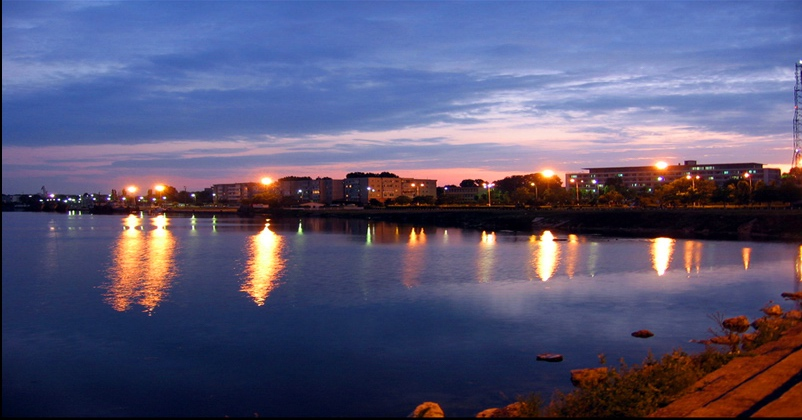
Port of Mangalia

The two satellite ports of Constanța are Midia, located 25 km (16 mi) north of the Constanța complex and Mangalia, 38 km (24 mi) to the south. Both perform a vital function in the overall plan to increase the efficiency of the main port's facilities - and both are facing continuous upgradings in order to meet the growing demands of cargo owners. In 2004 the traffic achieved by the two satellite ports was 3% from the general traffic, 97% being achieved by the Port of Constanța.

The Port of Midia is located on the Black Sea coastline, approx 13.5 nmi (25.0 km) north of Constanța. The north and south breakwaters have a total length of 6.7 km (4.2 mi). The port covers 834 ha (89,800,000 sq ft) of which 234 ha (25,200,000 sq ft) is land and 600 ha (65,000,000 sq ft) is water. There are 14 berths (11 operational berths, three berths belong to Constanța Shipyard) with a total length of 2.24 km (1.39 mi). Further to dredging operations performed the port depths are increased to 9 m (30 ft) at crude oil discharging berths 1–4, allowing access to tankers having a 8.5 m (28 ft) maximum draught and 20,000 DWT.

The Port of Mangalia is located on the Black Sea, close to the southern border with Bulgaria, and over 260 km (160 mi) north of Istanbul. It covers 142.19 ha (15,305,000 sq ft) of which 27.47 ha (2,957,000 sq ft) is land and 114.72 ha (12,348,000 sq ft) is water. The north and south breakwaters have a total length of 2.74 km (1.70 mi). There are 4 berths (2 operational berths) with a total length of 540 m (1,770 ft). The maximum depth is 9 m (30 ft).

== Statistics ==
In 2023 the Port of Constanța handled a total traffic of 92,693,915 tonnes (91,229,956 long tons; 102,177,551 short tons) of cargo and 884,598 twenty-foot equivalent units (TEU). The port is the main container hub in the Black Sea and all direct lines between Asia and Black Sea call in Constanța. This is due to the efficiency of the Constanţa South Container Terminal (CSCT), operated by DP World, and to the natural position of the port with deep water (up to 18.5 m (61 ft)) and a direct link to the Danube. The main port operators are A. P. Moller-Maersk Group, APM Terminals, Dubai Ports World, SOCEP, Oil Terminal S.A. and Comvex.

General statistics, 2006—2022
| Years | 2006 | 2010 | 2015 | 2016 | 2017 | 2018 | 2019 | 2020 | 2021 | 2022 |
|---|---|---|---|---|---|---|---|---|---|---|
| Total traffic^{*} | 57,126,389 | 47,563,879 | 56,336,772 | 59,424,821 | 58,379,154 | 61,303,774 | 66,603,292 | 60,375,799 | 67,483,435 | 75,537,687 |
| Liquid bulk^{*} | 14,731,819 | 11,210,940 | 12,203,606 | 13,662,917 | 13,354,280 | 14,022,558 | 14,920,635 | 12,425,658 | 12,821,712 | 18,001,109 |
| Dry bulk^{*} | 28,023,866 | 27,157,391 | 33,285,131 | 35,189,409 | 34,853,978 | 37,192,770 | 41,583,345 | 38,580,780 | 44,562,451 | 44,831,522 |
| General Cargo^{*} | 4,554,946 | 3,307,669 | 3,998,471 | 3,675,141 | 3,646,803 | 3,524,788 | 3,546,879 | 3,023,669 | 3,915,944 | 4,783,304 |
| Containers (Gross Weight)^{*} | 9,815,758 | 5,887,879 | 6,849,564 | 6,897,354 | 6,524,093 | 6,563,658 | 6,552,433 | 6,345,692 | 6,183,913 | 7,921,752 |
| Containers (number) | 672,443 | 353,711 | 420,793 | 434,439 | 413,253 | 400,832 | 400,945 | 389,061 | 379,139 | 460,506 |
| Containers (TEU's) | 1,037,077 | 556,694 | 689,012 | 711,339 | 696,438 | 668,016 | 666,036 | 643,725 | 631,946 | 776,590 |
| Seagoing vessels | 5,049 | 5,202 | 4,605 | 4,331 | 4,093 | 4,139 | 4,176 | 4,031 | 3,985 | 4,498 |
| River vessels | 8,180 | 7,945 | 9,769 | 10,185 | 9,272 | 9,487 | 10,395 | 10,344 | 10,619 | 10,890 |

* figures in tonnes

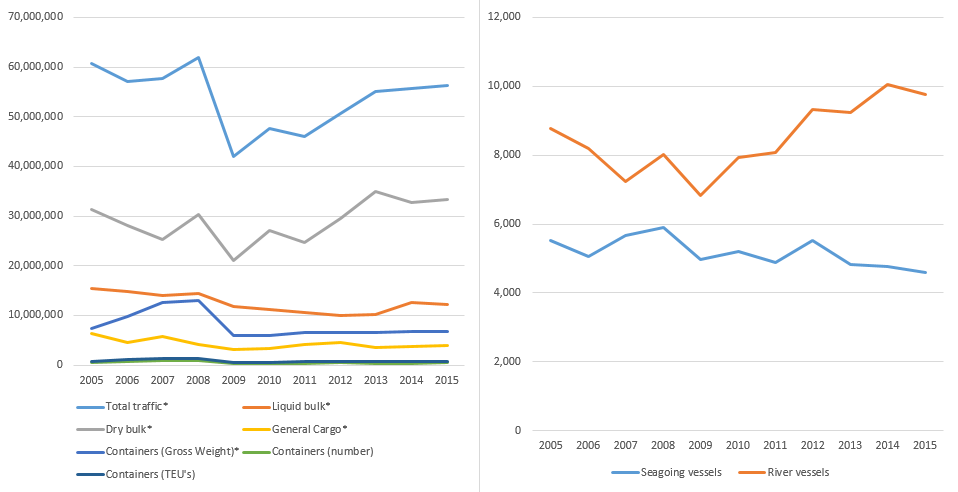

== Terminals ==
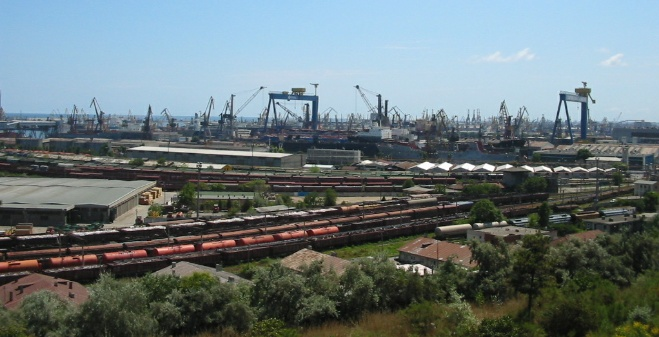
Constanţa shipyard

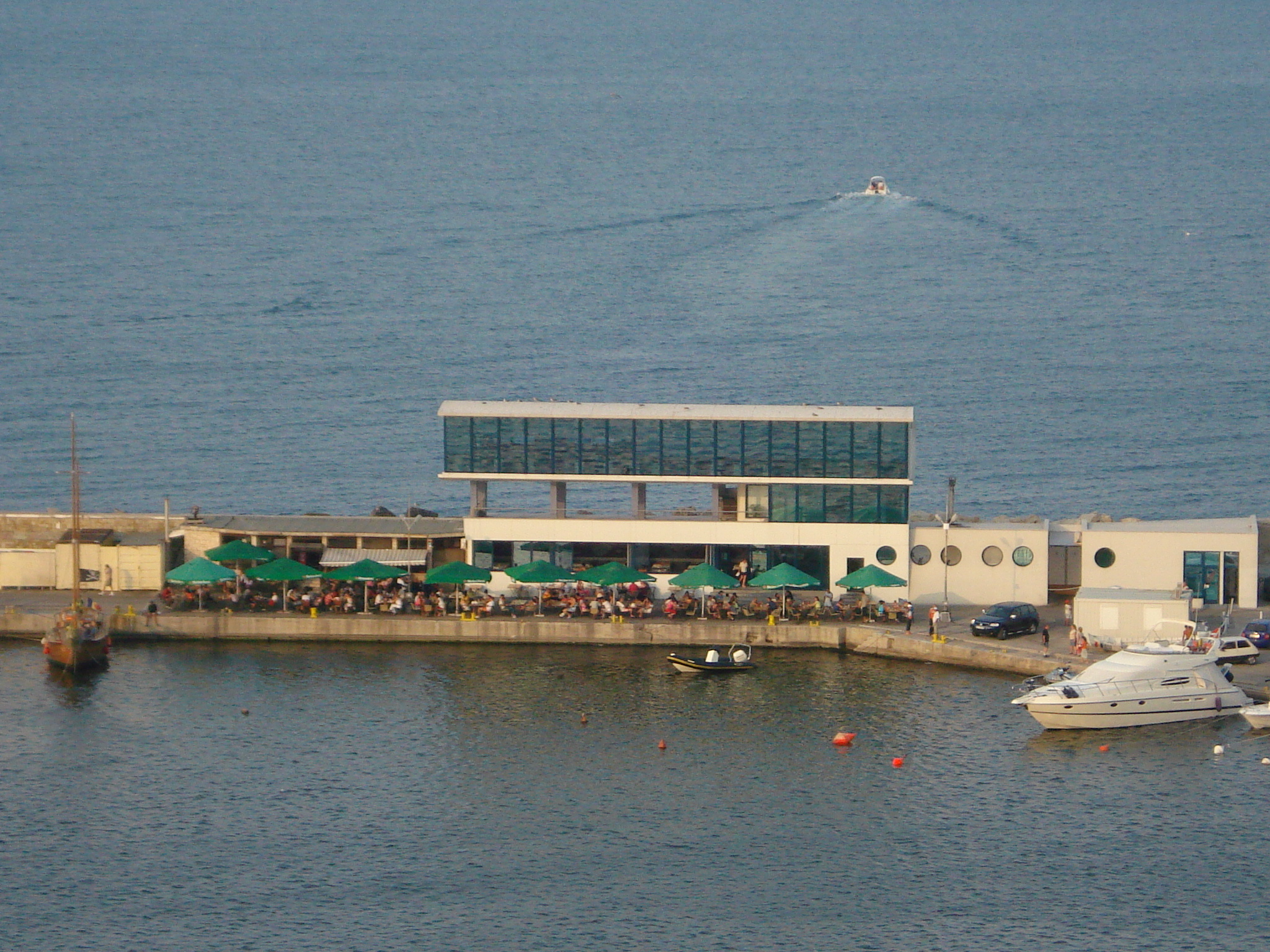
Port of Tomis

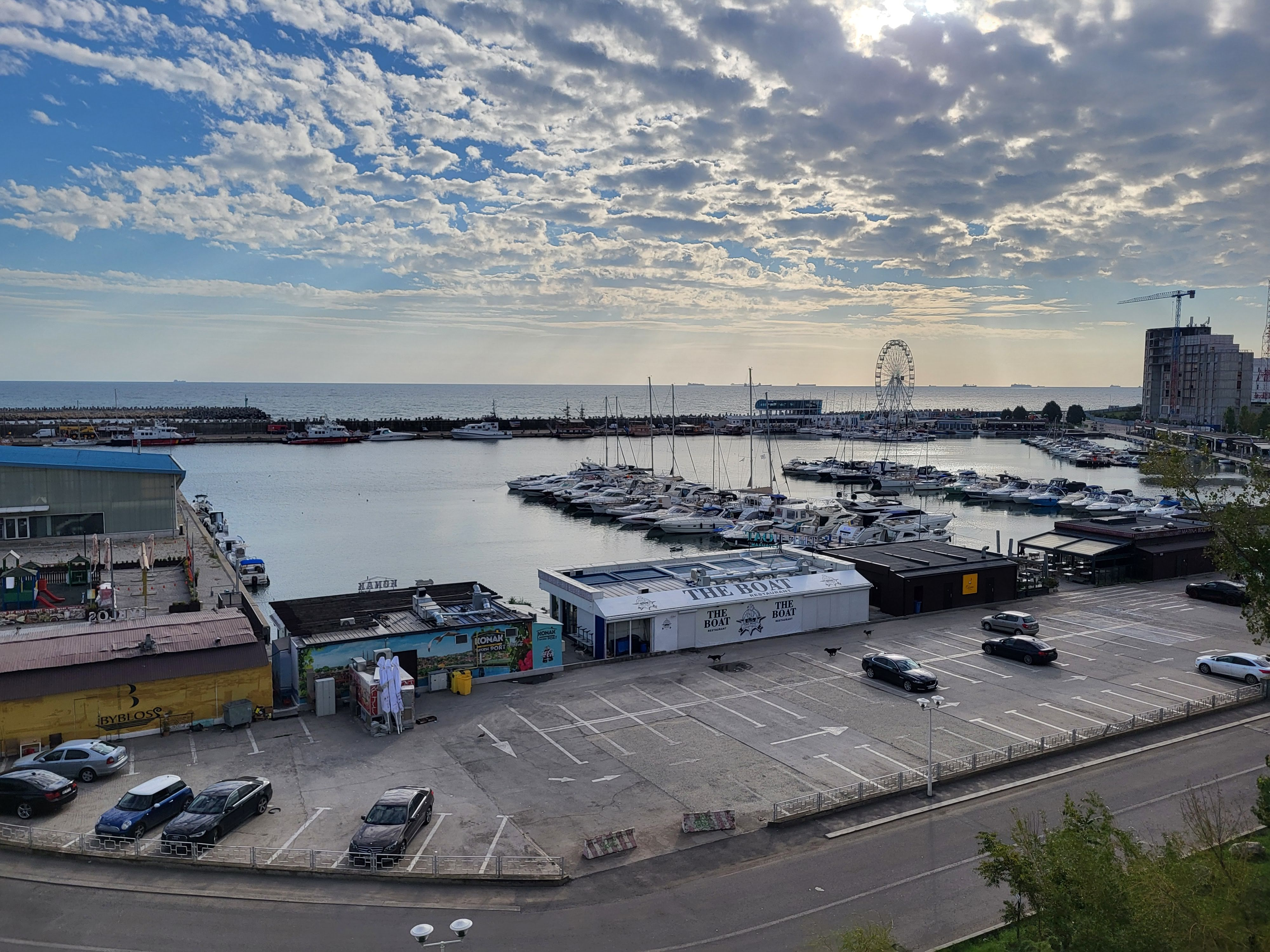
Touristic port of Constanta

The annual traffic capacity of the liquid bulk terminal is 24,000,000 tonnes (24,000,000 long tons; 26,000,000 short tons) for unloading and 10,000,000 tonnes (9,800,000 long tons; 11,000,000 short tons) for loading, it is specialised in importing crude oil, diesel, gas and exporting refined products and chemical products. The terminal has nine berths and the main operator is Oil Terminal S.A. Rompetrol invested US$175 million in a new oil terminal finished in 2008, with an annual capacity of 24,000,000 tonnes (24,000,000 long tons; 26,000,000 short tons).

There are two specialised terminals that operate iron ore, bauxite, coal and coke with 13 berths, a storage capacity of 4,700,000 tonnes (4,600,000 long tons; 5,200,000 short tons) simultaneously and an annual traffic capacity of around 27,000,000 tonnes (27,000,000 long tons; 30,000,000 short tons). The terminal has 10 berths with storage facilities for phosphorus 36,000 tonnes (35,000 long tons; 40,000 short tons), urea 30,000 tonnes (30,000 long tons; 33,000 short tons) and chemical products 48,000 tonnes (47,000 long tons; 53,000 short tons). The annual traffic capacity is 4,200,000 tonnes (4,100,000 long tons; 4,600,000 short tons). There are two terminals for cereals in Constanța North and Constanța South, with a total annual traffic capacity of 5,000,000 tonnes (4,900,000 long tons; 5,500,000 short tons). Constanța North Terminal has five berths, a storage capacity of 1,080,000 tonnes (1,060,000 long tons; 1,190,000 short tons) per year, and an annual traffic capacity of 2,500,000 tonnes (2,500,000 long tons; 2,800,000 short tons). Constanța South Terminal has one berth, a storage capacity of 1,000,000 tonnes (980,000 long tons; 1,100,000 short tons) per year, and an annual traffic capacity of 2.5 million tonnes. For refrigerated products, the terminal has one berth and an annual storage capacity of 17,000 tonnes (17,000 long tons; 19,000 short tons) tonnes. The terminal has one berth, the organic oils are stored in seven storage tanks of 25,000 tonnes (25,000 long tons; 28,000 short tons) each, and the molasses is directly discharged in ships, rail cars or tankers.

For cement and construction materials, there are two terminals with seven berths and a storage capacity of 40,000 tonnes and an annual traffic capacity of 4 million tonnes. There is also a private cement terminal operated by a Spanish company Ceminter International with an annual traffic capacity of 1 million tonnes. There is one timber terminal built in 2006 with one berth and an annual traffic capacity of 600,000 tonnes (590,000 long tons; 660,000 short tons) per year, or 850,000 cubic metres (30,000,000 cu ft) per year, operated by Kronospan.

There are two roll on roll off (roro) terminals with two berths, one in Constanța North with storage for 4,800 vehicles and one in Constanța South with storage for 1,800 vehicles. There is also a private RORO terminal only for automobiles operated by Romcargo Maritim with a storage capacity for 6,000 automobiles which covers an area of 2.5 ha (6.2 acres) in Constanța North. The ferry-boat terminal has one berth used for loading and unloading railway cars, locomotives and trucks. The terminal has an annual traffic capacity of 1 tonne (0.98 long tons; 1.1 short tons). There are two container terminals with 14 berths, one in Constanța North with two berths, and an area of 11.4 ha (1,230,000 sq ft), and one in Constanța South with 12 berths with the most important Constanța South Container Terminal.

Hutchison Whampoa was interested in investing around US$80 million in a new container terminal of 650–700,000 twenty-foot equivalent unit (TEUs) located in Constanța South on a 35 ha (3,800,000 sq ft) plot of land. The terminal was finished in 2010.

The passenger terminal situated in Constanța North has an annual traffic capacity of 100,000 people. In 2014, the port was visited by 92 passenger ships which had on board around 69,910 tourists.

The barge terminal has one berth and it is located in Constanța South on the eastern shore of the Danube–Black Sea Canal. The berth is 1.2 km (0.75 mi) long and the water is seven meters deep. The tugboat terminal has one berth and it is located in Constanța South on the western shore of the Danube–Black Sea Canal. The berth is 300 m (980 ft) long and the water is five meters deep. Both terminals have an annual traffic capacity of 10,000,000 tonnes (9,800,000 long tons; 11,000,000 short tons).

In 2010 the largest liquefied petroleum gas (LPG) terminal in Romania was opened in the Port of Midia by Octagon Gas, after an initial investment of €12 million. The terminal occupies an area of 24,000 m^{2} (260,000 sq ft) and has a storage capacity of 4,000 m^{3} (140,000 ft^{3}) in 10 storage tanks 400 m^{3} (14,000 ft^{3}) each. The terminal also involved the construction of a new 120 m (390 ft) long berth.
