= Alfons Oscar Saligny =

Romanian chemist

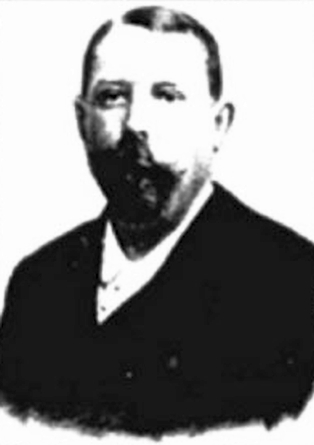
Alfons Oscar Saligny

Alfons Oscar Saligny (April 3, 1853 – May 4, 1903) was a Romanian chemist.

== Biography ==
The brother of engineer Anghel Saligny, he was the first child born to a family of intellectuals in Focșani in Moldavia; his father Alfred, of French origin, had settled in the region in the late 1840s. Saligny began his education in a school for wealthy families founded by his father, which emphasized mastery of the French language. He went on to study at the Focșani Gymnasium. He then enrolled in Berlin University, studying under August Wilhelm von Hofmann. He obtained a doctorate in 1875, with a dissertation on organic chemistry.

Returning home the same year, he secured a position as chemist at the Colțea Hospital laboratory in Bucharest. Also in 1875, he became professor of mineralogy at the School of Bridges and Roads. His research involved tests on the concrete needed for building silos in Brăila, Galați and Constanța. He also studied the properties of iron and steel, required for the building of King Carol I Bridge, designed by his brother. In 1886, he founded a materials testing laboratory within the school. In 1889, he was named full professor of general and applied chemistry, leading the department until his death. From 1879 to 1899, he headed the laboratory at the State Mint. Saligny performed laboratory tests on building materials for railroads, and from 1899 to 1903, he was affiliated with Căile Ferate Române state railway. In 1902, Saligny was elected a corresponding member of the Romanian Academy. He published numerous studies in specialty magazines until his death in 1903.
