= Anghel Saligny =

Romanian engineer

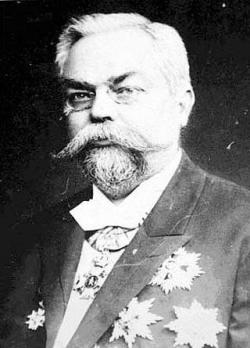
- Born: 19 April 1854; Șerbănești, Tecuci County, Moldavia
- Died: 17 June 1925 (aged 71); Bucharest, Kingdom of Romania
- Citizenship: Moldavia; Kingdom of Romania
- Occupation(s): engineer, professor President of the Romanian Academy (1907-1910)
- Board member of: Romanian Academy
- Spouse: Tereza Kohna (Sept. 1876)
- Father: Alfred Saligny
- Relatives: brother - Alfons Oscar Saligny, chemist, corresponding member of the Romanian Academy

Anghel Saligny (Romanian pronunciation: [ˈaŋɡel saˈliɲi]; 19 April 1854, Șerbănești, Moldavia – 17 June 1925, Bucharest, Romania) was a Romanian engineer, most famous for designing the Fetești-Cernavodă railway bridge (1895) over the Danube, the longest bridge in Europe at that time. He also designed the storage facilities in Constanța seaport, one of the earliest examples of reinforced concrete architecture in Europe.

== Biography ==
Saligny was born in Șerbănești, Tecuci County (nowadays, Galați County). His father, Alfred Saligny, an educator of French descent, was an immigrant to Moldavia, coming from Prussia. He started his studies at the boarding school founded by his father in Focșani, then went on to high school, initially also in Focșani and then in Potsdam, Germany. He pursued engineering studies at the Technische Hochschule in Charlottenburg (now Technische Universität Berlin), and then contributed to the construction of railways in Saxony (Cottbus-Frankfurt an der Oder). He was a founding member of the Bucharest Polytechnic Society (the precursor of today's Politehnica University of Bucharest) and was even appointed Minister of Public Works. In 1892, he was elected a member of the Romanian Academy, and he served as its president between 1907 and 1910.

Anghel Saligny's brother Alfons Oscar Saligny was a chemist and educator who was also elected a member of the Romanian Academy.

== Works ==
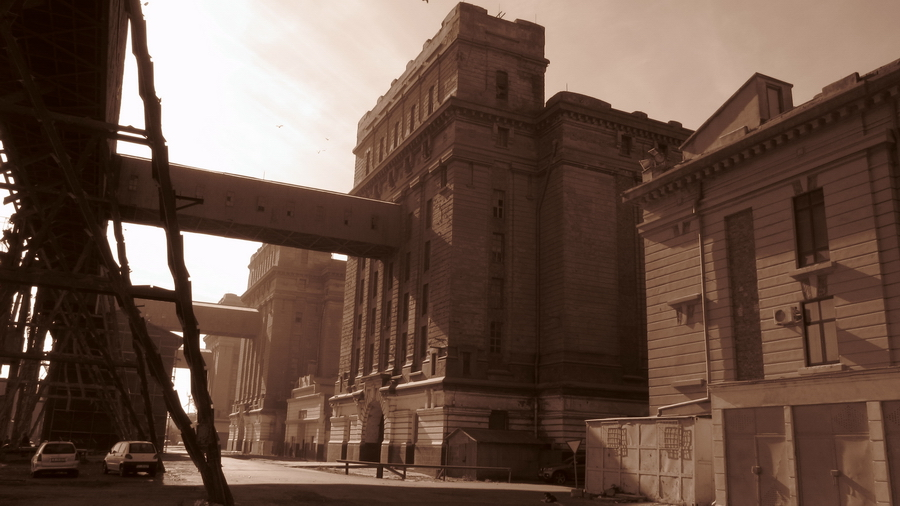
Constanța silos

In all of his works (bridges, roads, silos, ports etc.), new elements are to be found. Some of them were considered great technological advances at the time.

Saligny drew the plans for the Adjud–Târgu Ocna railway, which included the first mixed-use (railway and highway) bridges in Romania (1881–1882). He was also involved in the construction of numerous other metallic bridges, such as the one at Cosmești over the Siret River, which measured 430 m (1,410 ft) in length.

Between 1884 and 1889, Saligny planned and built the first silos in the world made of reinforced concrete, which are preserved today in Constanța, Brăila, and Galați. In the port of Constanța, he designed a special pool for oil export and two silos for grain export.

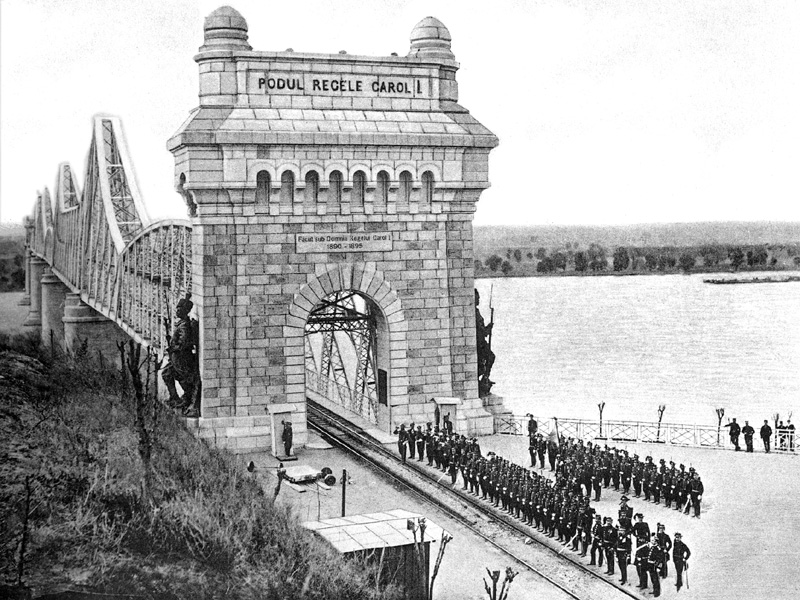
King Carol I bridge at its inauguration

Saligny's most important work was the King Carol I Bridge over the Danube at Cernavodă. Although a public offer had been made by the Romanian government for the erection of a bridge in that location, all projects were found to be subpar and subsequently rejected. Taking Saligny's previous experience into account, the Romanian government hired him and gave him the daunting (at the time) task of drawing up the plans for the new structure. Construction work for the bridge started 26 November 1890, in the presence of King Carol I of Romania. The bridge has five openings, with four being 140 m (460 ft) wide, and the central one spanning 190 m (620 ft). To allow ships to pass under the bridge, it was raised 30 m (98 ft) above the water. The endurance test was performed on the official opening day, when a convoy of locomotives drove on it at 85 km/h (53 mph). The bridge at Cernavodă measures 4,037 m (13,245 ft) in length, with 1,662 m (5,453 ft) over the Danube, and 920 m (3,020 ft) over the Borcea Arm. At the time, it was the longest bridge in Europe, and the second longest bridge in the world. The structure was famous for its era, competing with Gustave Eiffel's engineering works in France—the Garabit viaduct and the Eiffel Tower in Paris.

== Brief presentation ==
=== Studies ===
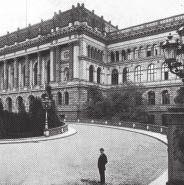
The Technische Hochschule in Charlottenburg, Berlin

- the primary classes at the pension in Focşani of his father - Alfred Saligny, pedagogue of French origin from Alsace, settled in Romania;
- secondary school studies at the future Unirea high school in Focşani (1866-1869);
- high school studies in Potsdam, Germany (1869);
- astronomy courses at the Friedrich Wilhelm University in Berlin, having the famous physicist Hermann von Helmholtz as a teacher;
- engineering studies at the Technische Hochschule in Charlottenburg-Berlin, Germany (1871-1874), where the illustrious engineers Johann Wilhelm Schwedler and Otto Franzius were professors.

=== Socio-professional activity ===
- after finishing his studies, he worked as an engineer on the construction of the Cottbus-Frankfurt (Oder) railway, in Saxony, and on hydraulic works in northern Prussia, under the direction of Georg Christoph Mehrtens (1874-1875);
- he returned to Romania at the end of 1875, being appointed ordinary engineer 3rd class in the Service of Bridges and Roads on January 1, 1886, and was immediately sent to Prague for receipts of railway material;
- upon returning to the country, he was appointed assistant at the second section of the Ploiești-Predeal railway line, fixing his residence in Câmpina and then in Breaza, in May 1876;
- he designed for the Bucharest City Hall the layout of the alleys next to the Kiseleff Boulevard (1876);
- he was appointed sub-director of the Bridges and Roads Service on April 8, 1881, and on April 27, 1881, he was promoted to first class ordinary engineer;
- he was entrusted, in the same year, with the construction works of the railway line Adjud-Târgu Ocna;

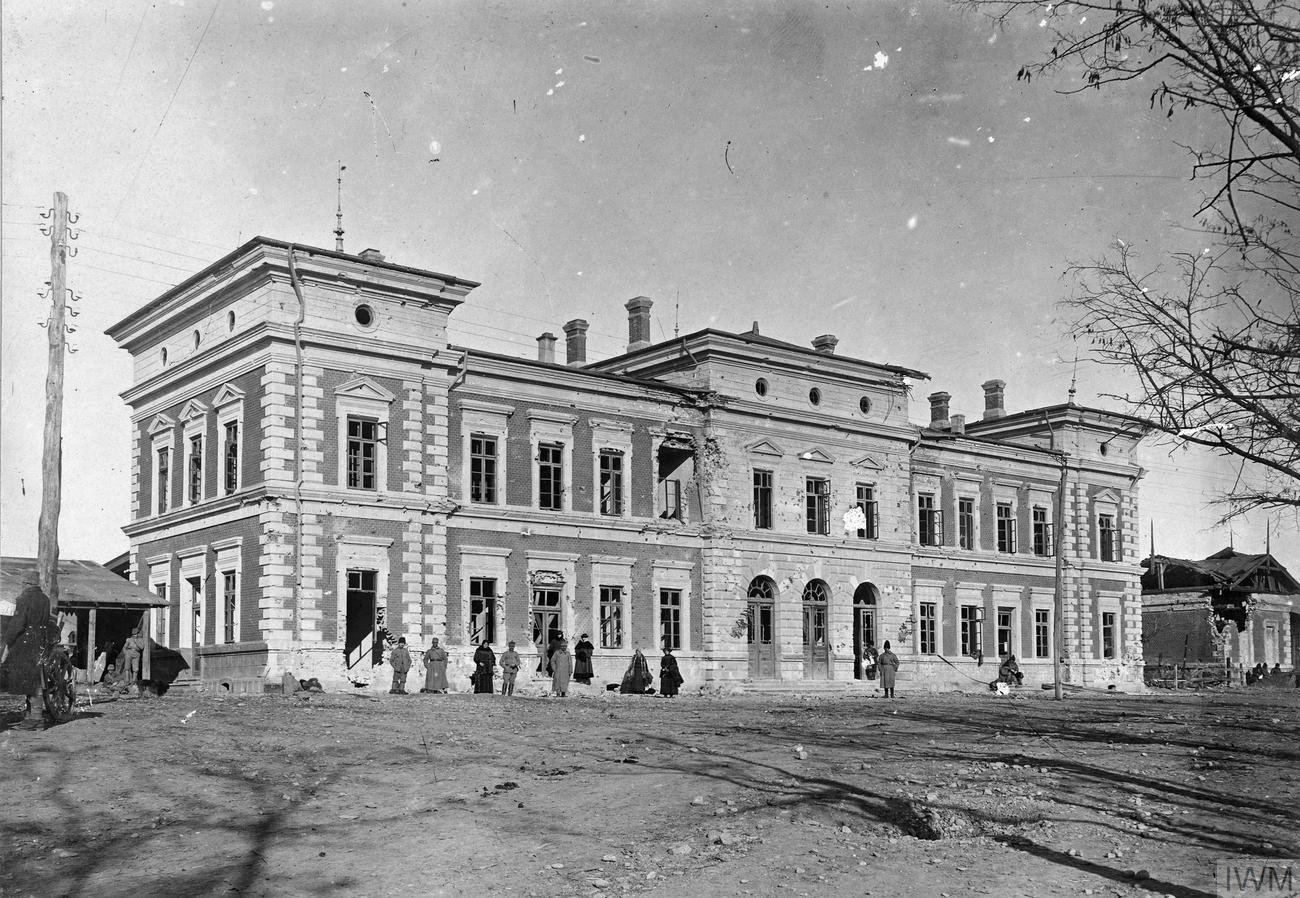
Gara Mare railway station in Târgu Ocna (architect: A. Saligny), partly destroyed in the World War I

- he was appointed director for construction of the railway lines Adjud-Târgu Ocna and Bârlad-Vaslui (June 14, 1882);
- he was entrusted with the construction of the iron bridges that had to replace the wooden bridges that had begun to collapse (March 1883);
- he was promoted to chief engineer (May 10, 1883);
- he was commissioned by the General Directorate C.F.R. with the reconstruction of the six large bridges on the Buzău-Mărăşeşti line (February 1884);
- he was appointed head of the "Bridges and Railways Service" (Oct. 1883), building numerous bridges, including the one in Cosmești, over Siret, the first large bridge designed by him - double road and railway bridge 430 metres (1,410 ft) long) - as well as those from Oneşti and Urecheşti;
- he was confirmed head of the Galati and Brăila Docks (October 3, 1884), a position he held until January 1, 1901, during which he coordinated the construction of docks and warehouses in the ports of Galați and Brăila; they could contain over 25,000 tons of grain - they were 30 metres (98 ft) x 120 metres (390 ft) at the base and over 18 metres (59 ft) high. The walls of the hexagonal cells of the silos were made, also in a world first, from pieces manufactured on the ground, in the form of plates. Prefabrication of floor slabs, stiffening and junction corners, welding of metal bars and assembly mechanization are other global priorities;
- he was appointed professor at the Department of Bridges within the "School of Bridges and Roads" that would become the "Polytechnic School" of Bucharest, (Nov. 1884 - 1914);
- he was president of the commissions for the selection of scholarship holders of the "Adamachi" fund for the study of engineering in Romania and of technical specializations abroad;
- he was promoted to first class chief engineer on June 16, 1886, and worked on the projects for the Filiaşi-Tg Jiu railway;
- he designed the bridge over the Danube from Cernavodă (1889);
- he was promoted to inspector general 2nd class on May 9, 1890, and was appointed to the technical commission of the Bucharest City Hall;
- he built a new standard-gauge Bacău-Piatra Neamț railway line, replacing the old narrow-gauge one (1890-1893);
- he built the bridge over the Danube from Cernavodă (October 9, 1890 - September 14/26, 1895);
- he was promoted to the rank of general inspector first class (January 1, 1894);
- he worked on the consolidation of the bridges over Râmnic and Milcov on the Buzău-Mărăşeşti railway line;
- he was appointed head of the Railway Bridges (April 1, 1892);
- he was appointed general director of the Railways (October 7, 1895), a position from which he initiated, in 1895, a law for the reorganization of the Romanian railways and created direct railway routes Bucharest-Berlin and Berlin-Constanța;
- he was appointed director of the Hydraulic department, of the Docks and Works of the Port of Constanța (13 Aug. 1899);
- he built the Ramadan port in Giurgiu, favoring the export of oil up the Danube and the import of coal and goods for Bucharest;
- he was appointed general director of the first Land Improvement Service within the Ministry of Agriculture and Domains, established for the development of land in the flood zone of the Danube and other large rivers in the country (Dec. 21, 1910 – Apr. 1, 1917);
- he was elected a member of the Board of Censors of the National Bank of Romania (February 17, 1913 – June 17, 1925) and of the "Steaua" oil company;
- he was director general of Munitions until Romania entered the First World War (Nov. 15, 1915 - Aug. 1916), Minister of Public Works (24 Oct. 1918 – 26 Sept. 1919);
- he was part of the boards of directors of "Banca de Scont" and "Banca Marmorosch Blank";
- he took part in the establishment, in 1913, of the first national maritime navigation society "Romania" and of the Romanian Danube Navigation Society, which started operating on March 1. 1914 (he was its president);
- he took part in the evacuation of the Romanian treasury in Iași during World War I, then in Moscow;
- he participated in the organization of the Bucharest Communal Tram Company, of which he was the delegated administrator (1909 – June 17, 1925).

== Collaborations ==
- Bulletin of the Polytechnic Society,
- Annals of the Romanian Academy,
- Adevărul newspaper etc.

== Affiliation ==
- founding member of the Polytechnic Society of Romania (founded in 1881) and its president between 1894-1897 and 1910–1911;
- corresponding member (March 31, 1892), full member (April 7, 1897), vice-president (March 26, 1901 – March 23, 1904) and president of the Romanian Academy (April 18, 1907 – May 25, 1910);
- founding member of the "Gazeta Matematică" Society (founded on Sept. 15, 1895) which established the "Anghel Saligny" fund for the printing of mathematics books, including the Gazeta Matematică magazine.

== Awards ==
- Grand Cross of the Imperial Austrian Order of Franz Joseph (1896);
- Grand Cross of the Order of St. Sava - Serbia (19 Oct. 1896);
- Grand Cross of the Order of the Crown of Romania (May 10, 1897);
- Commander of the Order of Leopold - Belgium (Nov. 27, 1897);
- Grand Cross of the Order of Civil Merit - Bulgaria (June 30, 1898);
- Grand Officer of the Legion of Honour - France (June 22, 1908);
- Grand Cross of the Order of the Star of Romania (October 27, 1909);
- Grand Cross of the Order of Saint Anna - Russia (April 10, 1910).

As a sign of gratitude, the Polytechnic Society of Romania erected a monument in Cernavodă and another in Bucharest. Also in honour of the great engineer, in 1957 a bronze statue of him was made by the famous sculptor Oscar Han, which was installed in 1965 in front of the main entrance of the Port of Constanța. Also, in front of the new building of the Faculty of Engineering of the "Lower Danube" University in Galați, there is a bust of the engineer, in bronze, installed in 1987.

== Notable works ==
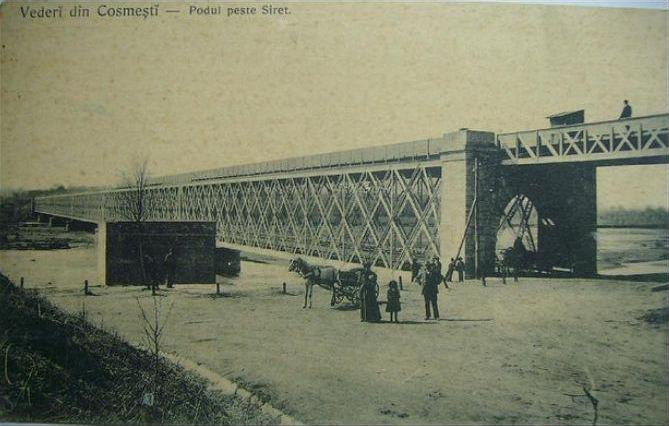
The railway and road bridge from Cosmești, Tecuci County, Kingdom of Romania

- he designed and built the Oneşti and Urecheşti bridges on the Adjud-Târgu Ocna railway line and the double road and railway bridge from Cosmești, over Siret (1882), railway line Tg. Jiu-Filiaşi, the tunnel from Valea Mostiştei, Ramadan port (Giurgiu);
- he led the construction works of the docks and silos in the ports of Brăila (1888) and Galați (1889), building warehouses with silos where, for the first time in the world, reinforced concrete and prefabricated concrete slabs were used to make the cells;
- he designed in 1888 and built between 1890 and 1895 the bridge over the Danube at Cernavodă, the longest bridge and with the largest opening - 130 metres (430 ft) - in 19th century Europe and the third in the world at that time.

== Gallery ==
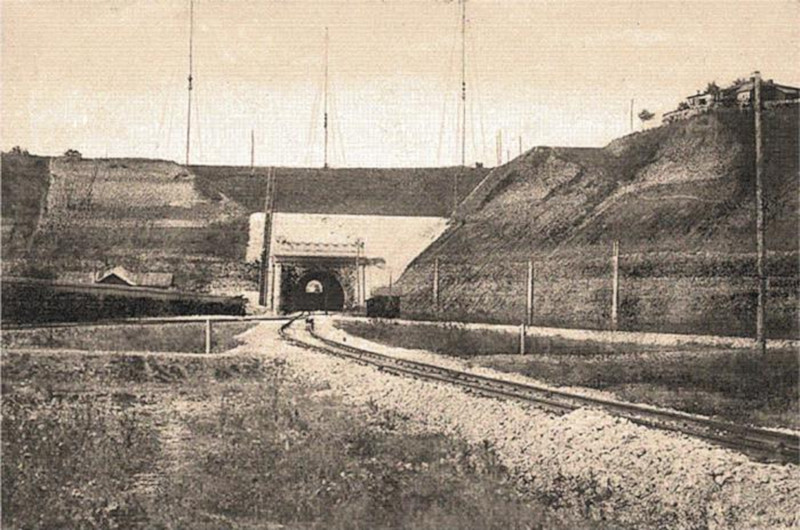
Tunnel "Carol I" (later "Palas") in Constanța county (1900)

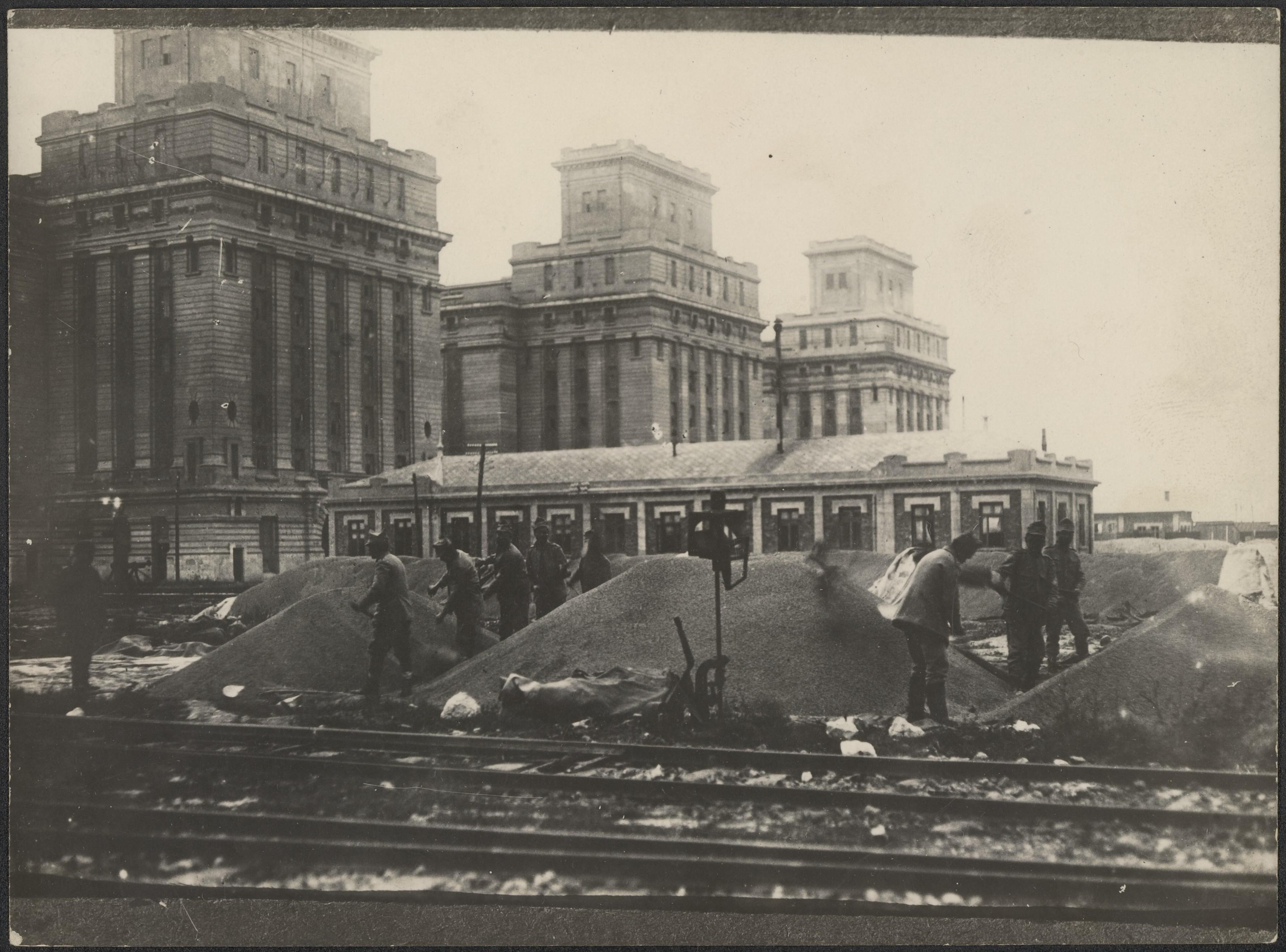
"Anghel Saligny" silos in Port of Constanța

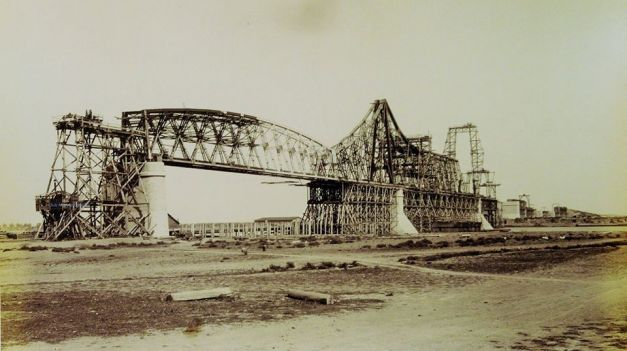
The "King Carol I" bridge during construction

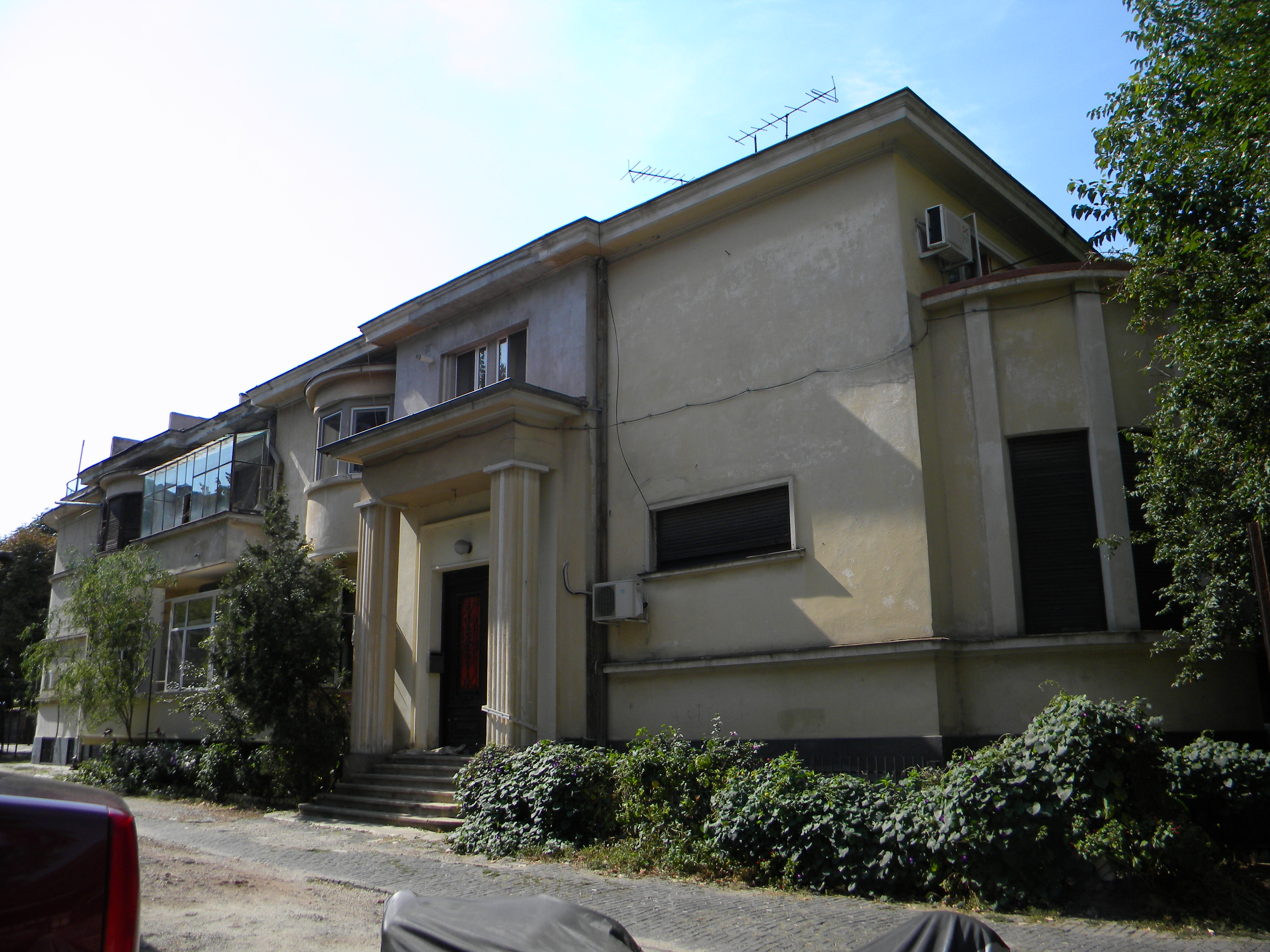
Anghel Saligny's house on Str. "Occidentului" no. 8–10, Bucharest

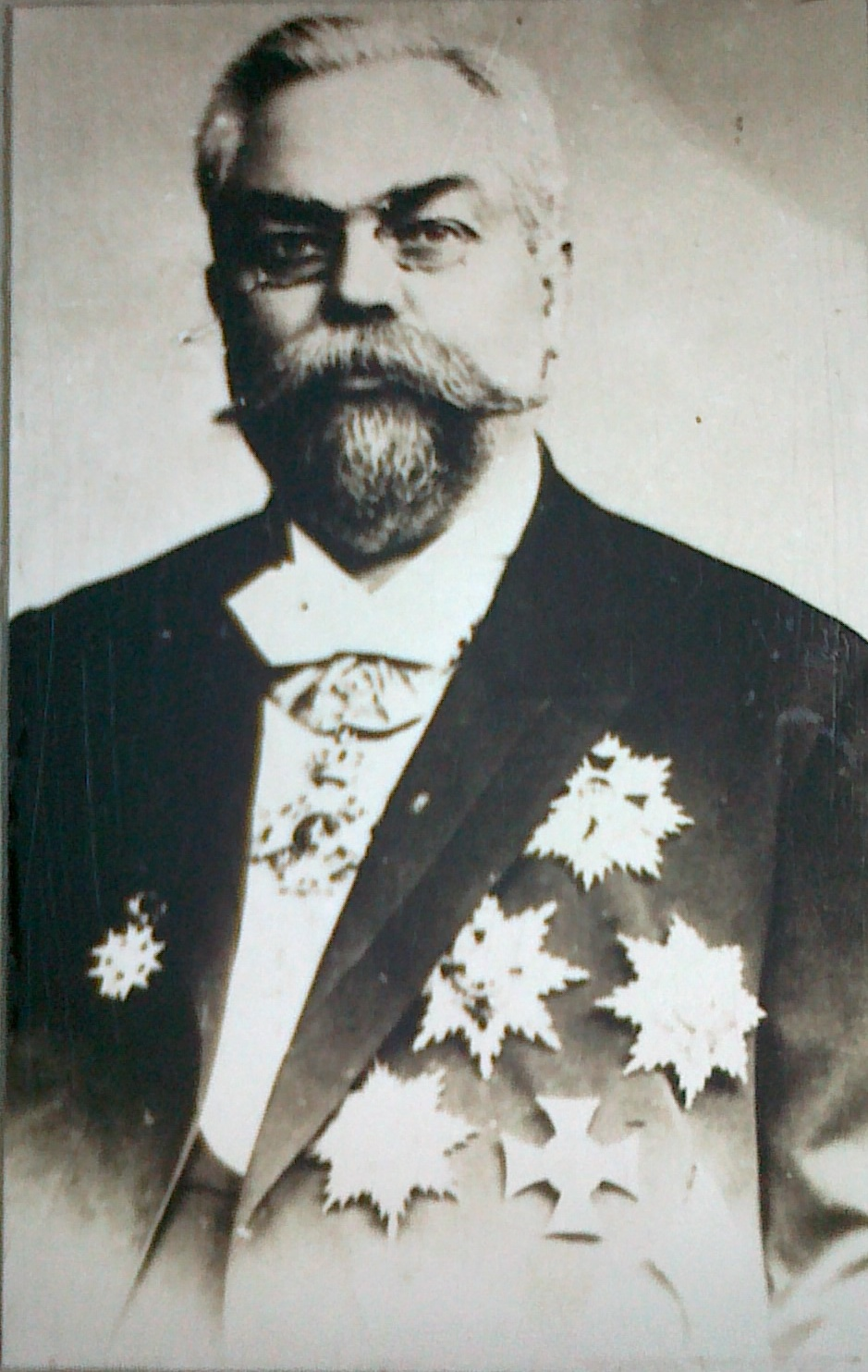
Anghel Saligny

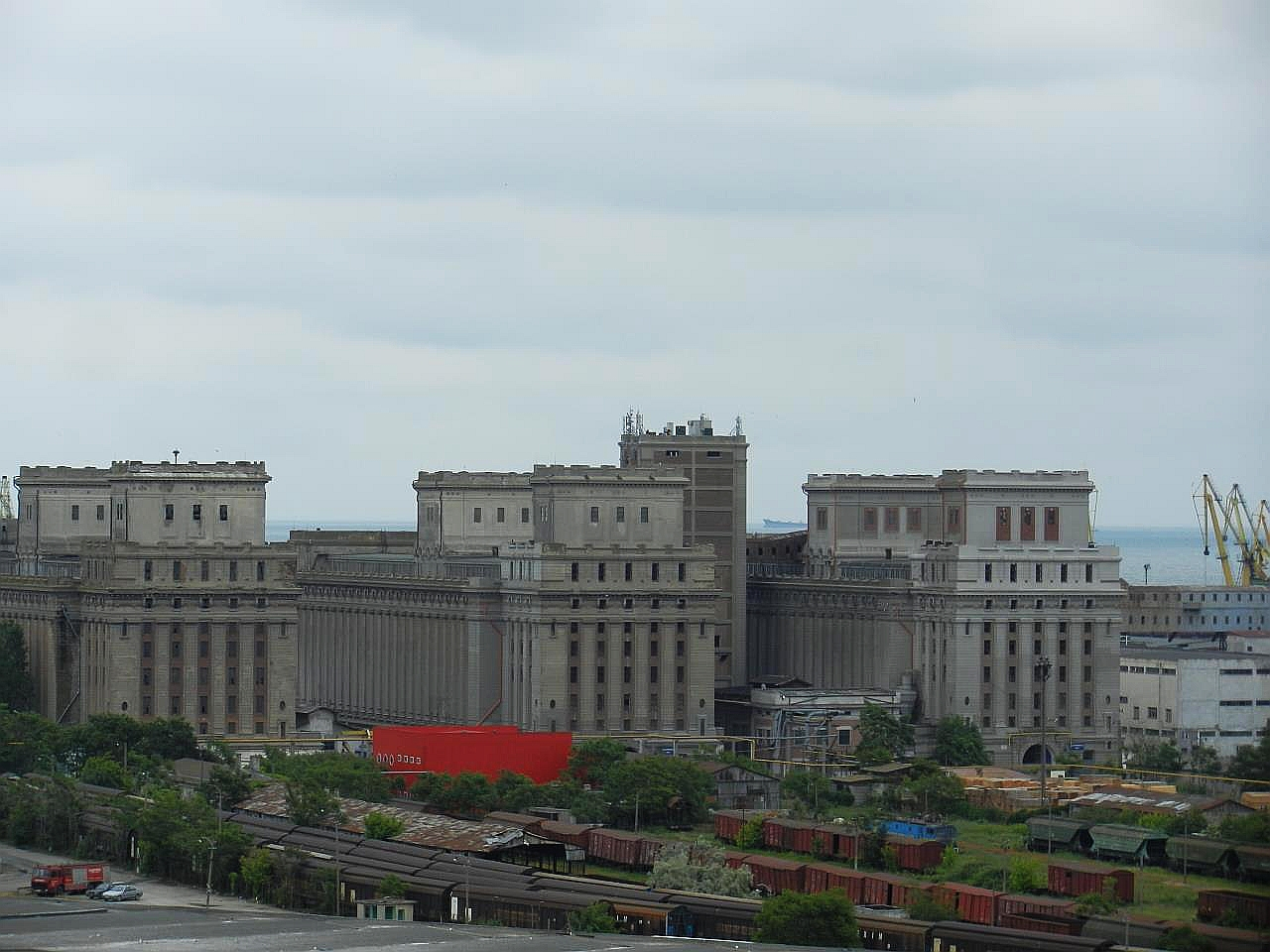
"Anghel Saligny" silos in Port of Constanța, nowadays

== See also ==
- Anghel Saligny Bridge
