= Cosmești, Galați =

Cosmești
- Commune
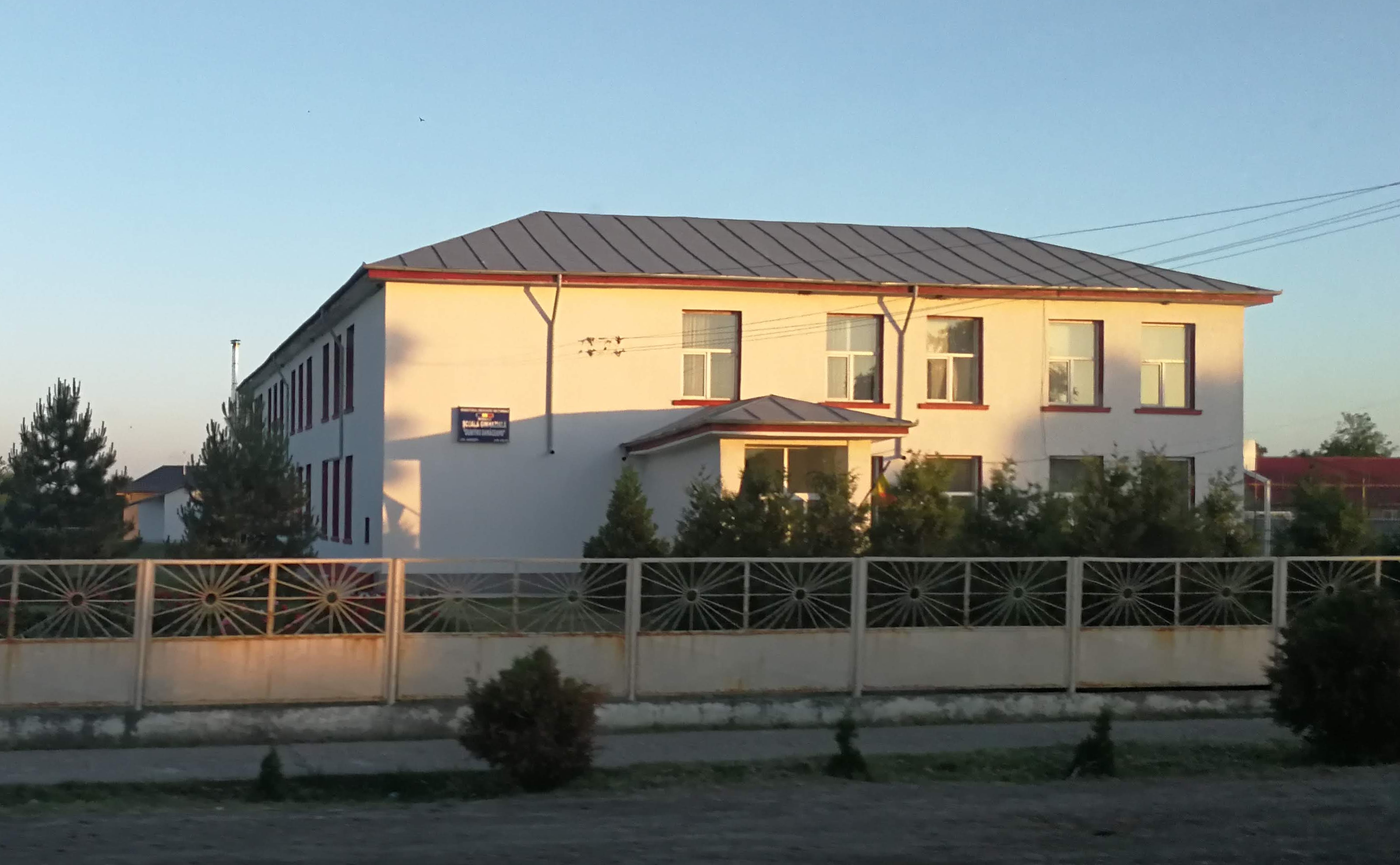
- Cosmești schoolhouse

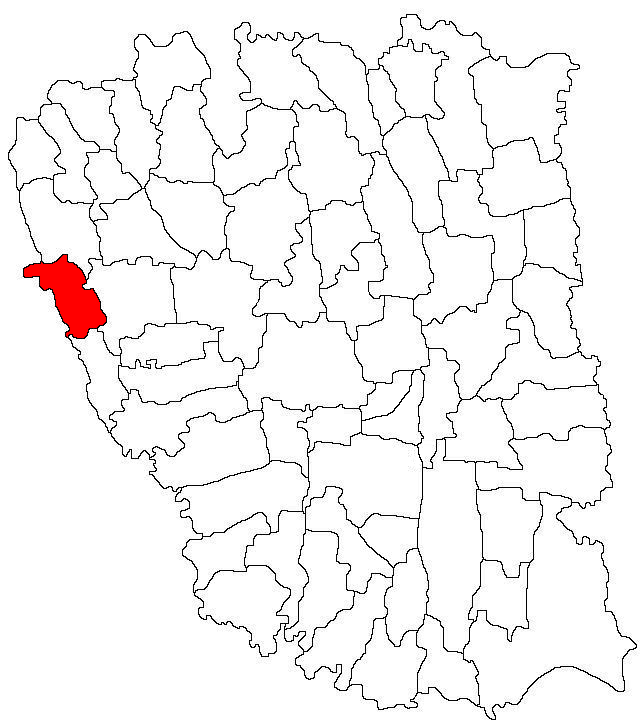
- Location in Galați County

- Location in Romania
- Coordinates: 45°52′10″N 27°18′39″E
- Country: Romania
- County: Galați

Government
  - Mayor (2024–2028): Ion Tuchiluș (PSD)
- Area: 49.89 km^{2} (19.26 sq mi)
- Elevation: 81 m (266 ft)
- Population (2021-12-01): 5,662
  - Density: 113.5/km^{2} (293.9/sq mi)
- Time zone: UTC+02:00 (EET)
  - Summer (DST): UTC+03:00 (EEST)
- Postal code: 807085
- Area code: (+40) 0236
- Vehicle reg.: GL
- Website: primaria-cosmesti.ro

Cosmești is a commune in Galați County, Western Moldavia, Romania. It is composed of six villages: Băltăreți, Cosmești, Cosmeștii-Vale, Furcenii Noi, Furcenii Vechi, and Satu Nou.

The commune lies on the Moldavian Plateau, on the banks of the Siret River. It is located in the western part of the county, on the border with Vrancea County.

Historical population
Year	Pop.	±%
2002	6,650	—
2011	5,196	−21.9%
2021	5,662	+9.0%
Source: Census data

At the 2021 census, Cosmești had a population of 5,662; of those, 94.08% were Romanians.

== Natives ==
- Ion Bîrlădeanu (born 1958), sprint kayaker
- Dumitru Dămăceanu (1896–1978), army officer in World War II, who played a predominant role in the 1944 Romanian coup d'état.
