= Tomb of Macridy Bey =

Ancient Macedonian tomb in Derveni, Greece

Coordinates: 40.7149903°N 22.9607821°E

The Tomb of Macridy Bey (Greek: Τάφος Μακρίδη Μπέη, romanized: tafos makridi bei), also known as the Tomb of Langadas, is an ancient Macedonian tomb of the Classical or early Hellenistic period, on the site of ancient Lete, modern Derveni between Thessaloniki and Langadas, in Central Macedonia, Greece. A number of cist graves and a single chamber tomb are located in the vicinity. The structure seems to date to the late fourth or early third century BCE.

== Description ==
The tomb consists of a monumental facade and two vaulted chambers (an antechamber and a burial chamber) on an east-west axis, covered by an extremely large earthen tumulus 19.5 m high and 76 m in diameter. Excavation has left parts of this tumulus in danger of subsidence. There was a 14.7 m long, 3.5 m wide dromos, paved with clay and gravel, which approached the facade from the west at a slightly oblique angle.

The 7.83 m high facade consists of four engaged Ionic columns. The middle two of these are half-columns, while the outer two are quarter columns, directly abutting the antae. These once supported an entablature and pediment, but these are lost. Bronze elements from the door were found, including sixty nails, a knocker, a handle, and a Medusa head, all of which are now in the Istanbul Archaeological Museum.

The antechamber is 5.4 m wide, 2.6 m long, and 6.35 m high. The walls are unusually thick, at 0.92 m. The walls were covered with painted stucco. The top third of the wall was painted white, the middle third was red, and the bottom third was painted as white imitation marble revetment with black bands at the top and bottom. The wall separating the antechamber from the burial chamber was largely intact in 1910, but large sections of it have now collapsed. A large marble door to burial chamber, decorated with discs, handle and head of Medusa, all covered in gold, led to the burial chamber. It is now in the Istanbul Archaeological Museum.

The burial chamber is 4.07 m wide, 5.08 m long, and 5.29 m high. The walls are even thicker than those of the antechamber, measuring 1.25 m. The walls were covered in white stucco, but do not seem to have been painted. The floor was decorated with black, red, and yellow lozenges, but these no longer survive. There is a sarcophagus along the entire back wall, which is 1.3 m high, divided into two unequal parts. The left section once contained the actual sarcophagus, while the smaller section on the right held grave goods. The actual burial was a pit on the central axis of the tomb underneath the sarcophagus. Remains of a wooden larnax, which once held the remains of the deceased, were found in this pit, covered by cypress planks and four marble slabs. The remains of a tunnel dug into the tomb by grave robbers in antiquity are still visible in the southwest corner of the chamber.

== Excavation ==
The tomb had already been looted and suffered earthquake damage when it was discovered and excavated in 1910 by Theodore Makridi, from whom it takes its modern name. Largely ignored for most of the twentieth century, further excavations were undertaken by Katerina Tzanavari in the 1990s, which uncovered part of the tumulus and a number of fragments which had become separated from the structure. An extensive restoration project was undertaken between 2012 and 2017, including extensive work to ensure the integrity of the tumulus, partially restore the structure (anastylosis) and ensure its structural integrity, protect it from the elements, and make it accessible to visitors.

== Bibliography ==
- Papasotiriou, A.; Athanasiou, F.; Malama, V.; Miza, M.; Sarantidou, M. (2010). "Damage assessment to the Macedonian "Tomb of Macridy Bey" at Derveni, Thessaloniki". 8o International Symposium of the Conservation of the Monuments in the Mediterranean Basin, . Patras.
- Málama, Venetia; Miza, Maria; Papasotiriou, Alexios; Sarantidou, Maria; Athanassiou, Fani (2017). "The restoration and the anastylosis of the Macedonian tomb of Macridy Bey near Thessaloniki". Opis. 1.
