= Mygdonia, Thessaloniki =

Mygdonia Μυγδονία
- Municipal unit
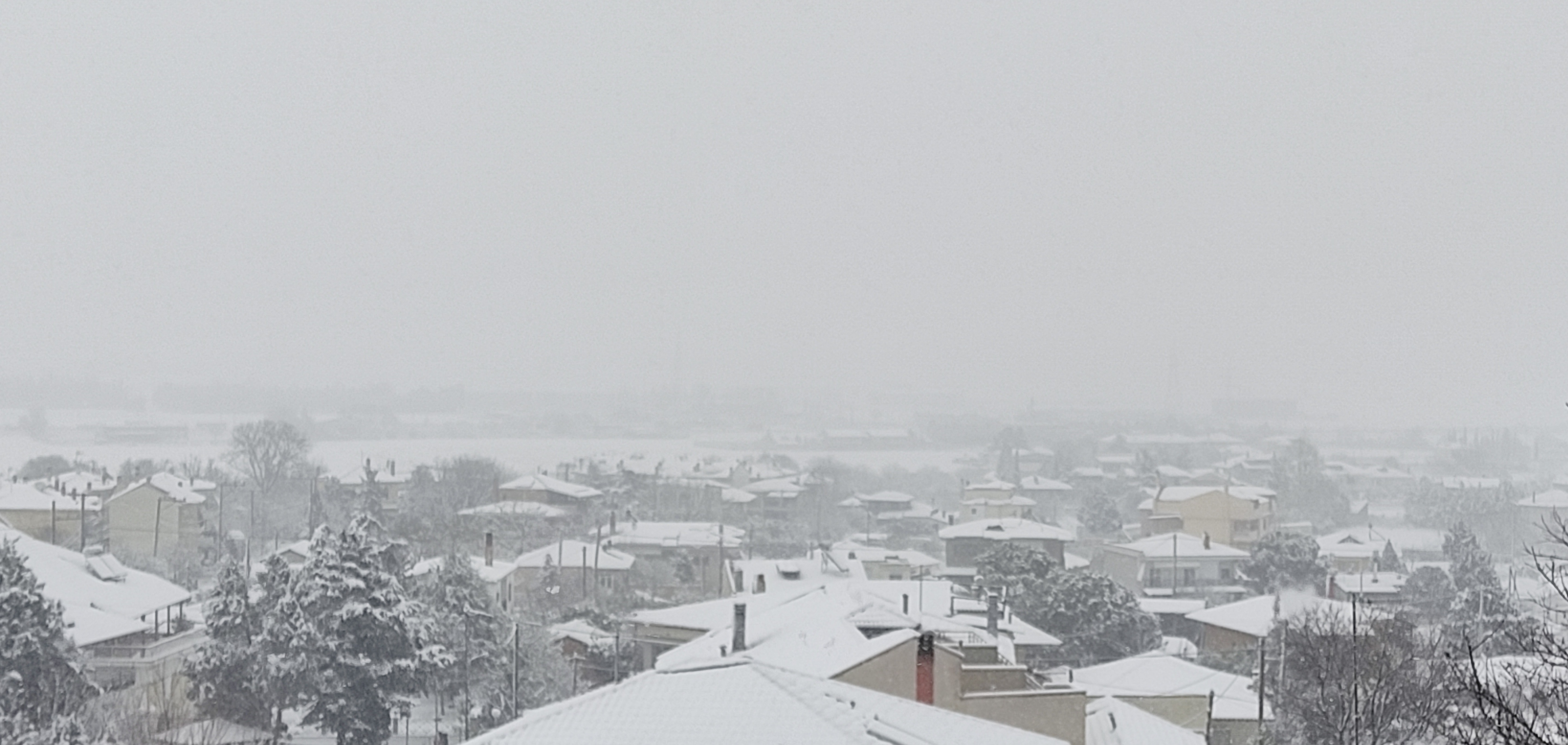
- The town of Liti in the winter

- Location within the regional unit

- Location within Greece
- Coordinates: 40°46′N 22°57′E
- Country: Greece
- Administrative region: Central Macedonia
- Regional unit: Thessaloniki
- Municipality: Oraiokastro

Area
  - Municipal unit: 98.506 km^{2} (38.033 sq mi)
- Elevation: 183 m (600 ft)

Population (2021)
  - Municipal unit: 9,830
  - Municipal unit density: 99.8/km^{2} (258/sq mi)
- Time zone: UTC+2 (EET)
  - Summer (DST): UTC+3 (EEST)

Mygdonia (Greek: Μυγδονία) is an administrative area in the Thessaloniki regional unit of Central Macedonia, Greece. A former municipality, since the 2011 local government reform it is part of the municipality Oraiokastro, of which it is a municipal unit. It consists of three communities, Drymos, Liti and Melissochori, adding up to a total population of 9,830 and an area of 98.506 km^{2}. The seat of the municipality was in Liti.

== Etymology ==
Mygdonia is named after the historical region of Mygdonia, which encompassed a much larger region than the modern municipal unit, stretching from Lake Volvi to the Axios river, including the city of Thessaloniki. According to the legend, it was named after Mygdon, a mythological figure considered to be a son of Ares and Callirhoe.

== History ==
According to archaeologists, the area has been inhabited since the Mesolithic era (9000-7000 BC). The first inhabitants were Pelasgians, followed by Thracian tribes such as the Mygdones and the Edoni, until Alexander I of Macedon conquered and annexed the area.

Archaeological discoveries have been made in the area, near the Liti village and at the location of Derveni. Discoveries include the ruins of the ancient city of Lete, ancient Macedonian tombs, tombstones, altars, statues, clay statuettes, coins, etc. Perhaps the most important discovery is the Derveni papyrus, an ancient Greek papyrus scroll, found in the city's necropolis in 1962 - a philosophical treatise on Orphic religion.

== See also ==
- Ancient Mygdonia
