= Archaeological Museum of Thessaloniki =

Museum in Thessaloniki, Greece

Thessaloniki Archaeological Museum
- Αρχαιολογικό Μουσείο Θεσσαλονίκης
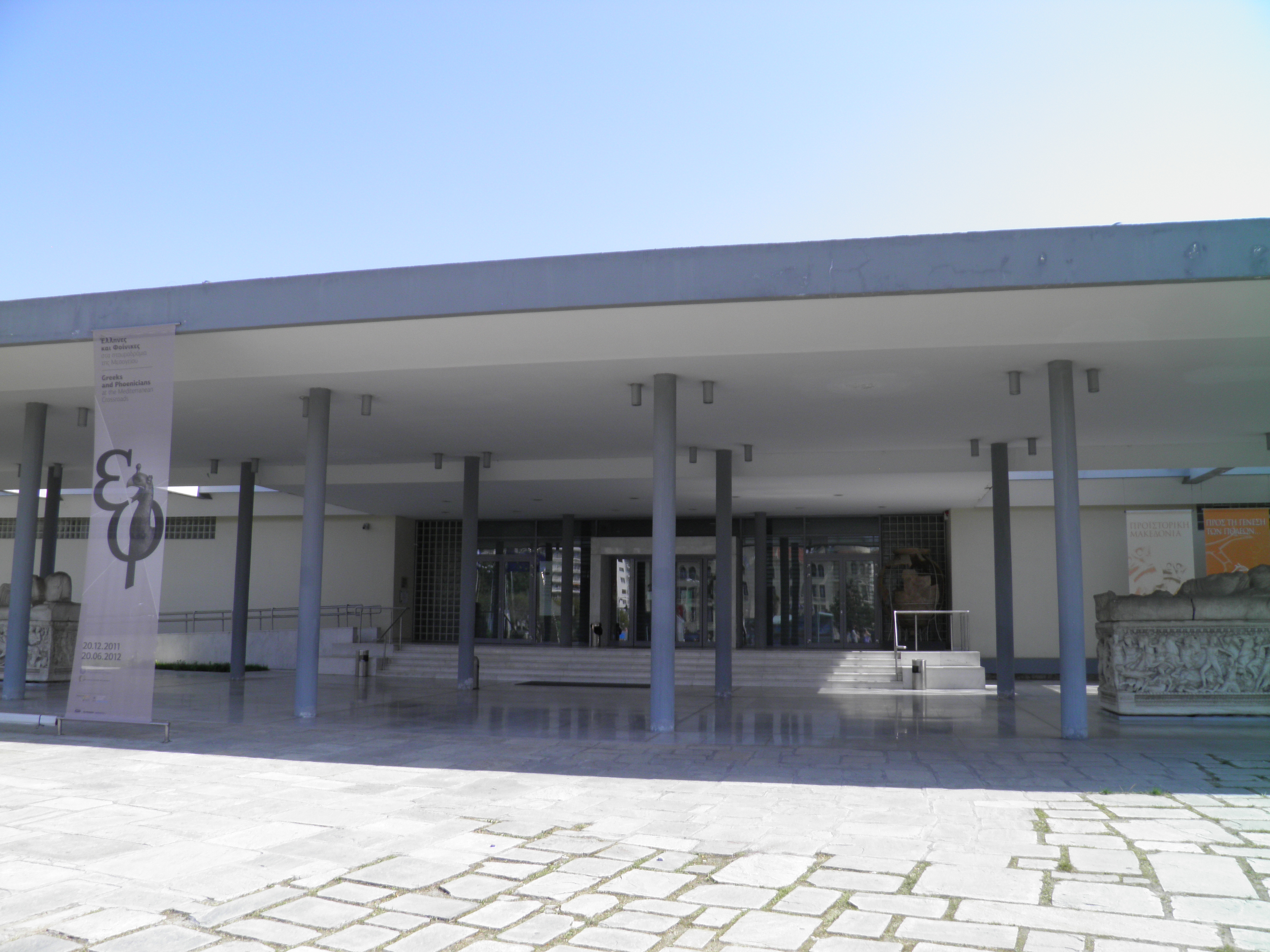
- An exterior view
- Established: 1912
- Location: M. Andronikou 6, GR-54621, Thessaloniki, Central Macedonia, Greece
- Coordinates: 40°37′30″N 22°57′14″E
- Type: Archaeological museum
- Collection size: 50,000
- Director: Polyxeni Adam-Veleni
- Architect: Patroklos Karantinos
- Public transit access: Panepistimio
- Website: Official website

The Archaeological Museum of Thessaloniki (Greek: Αρχαιολογικό Μουσείο Θεσσαλονίκης Arkhaiologikó Mouseío Thessaloníkis) is a museum in Thessaloniki, Central Macedonia, Greece. It holds and interprets artifacts from the Prehistoric, Archaic, Classical, Hellenistic and Roman periods, mostly from the city of Thessaloniki but also from the region of Macedonia in general.

== The building and the exhibitions ==
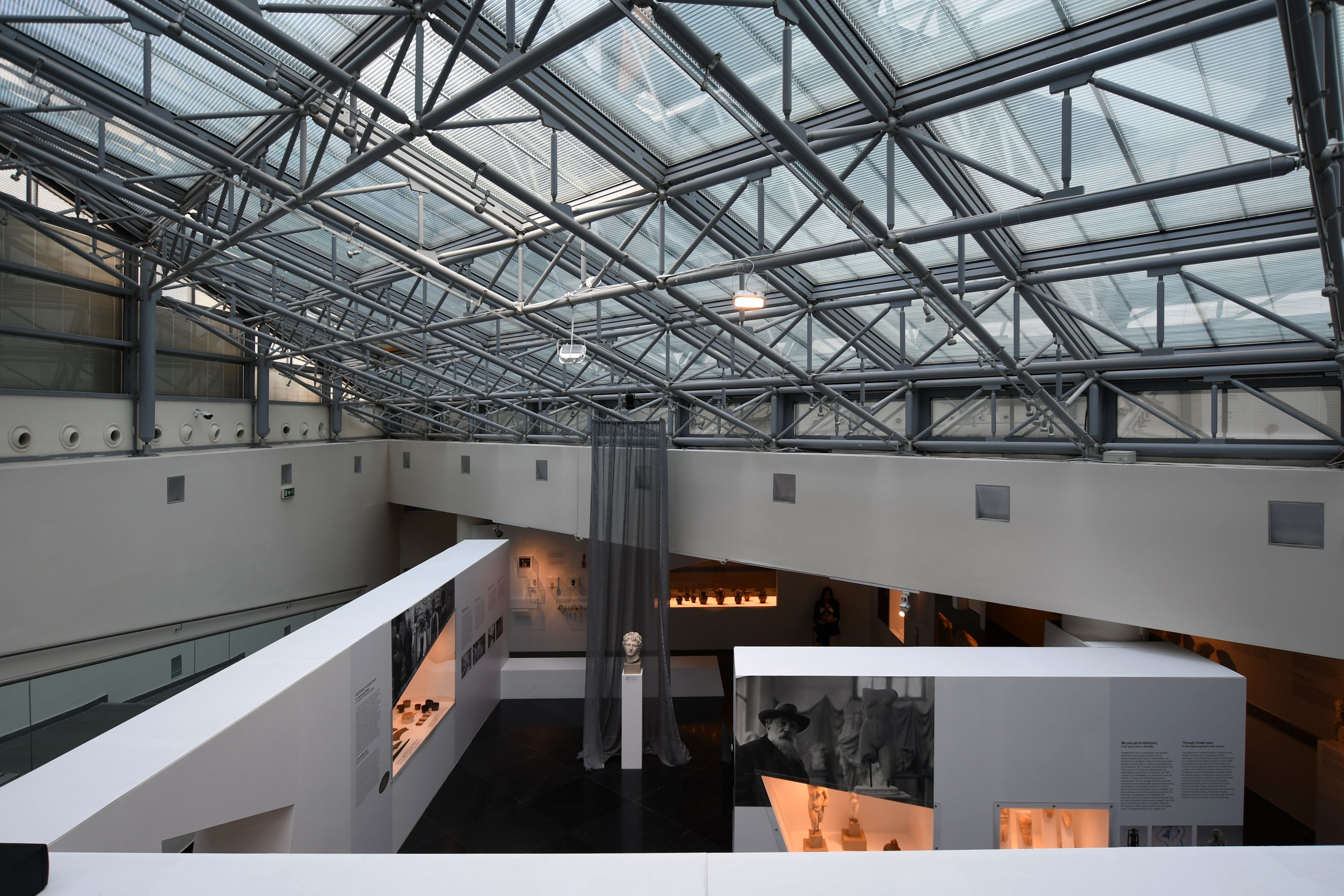
Interior

The museum is housed in a building designed by architect Patroklos Karantinos and is an example of the modern architectural trends of Greece. Built in 1962, the museum had a new wing added to it in 1980, in which the findings from Vergina were displayed, up until 1997. In 2001 and 2004, in the run-up to the 2004 Athens Olympics, the museum was extensively renovated and its permanent exhibits reorganized.

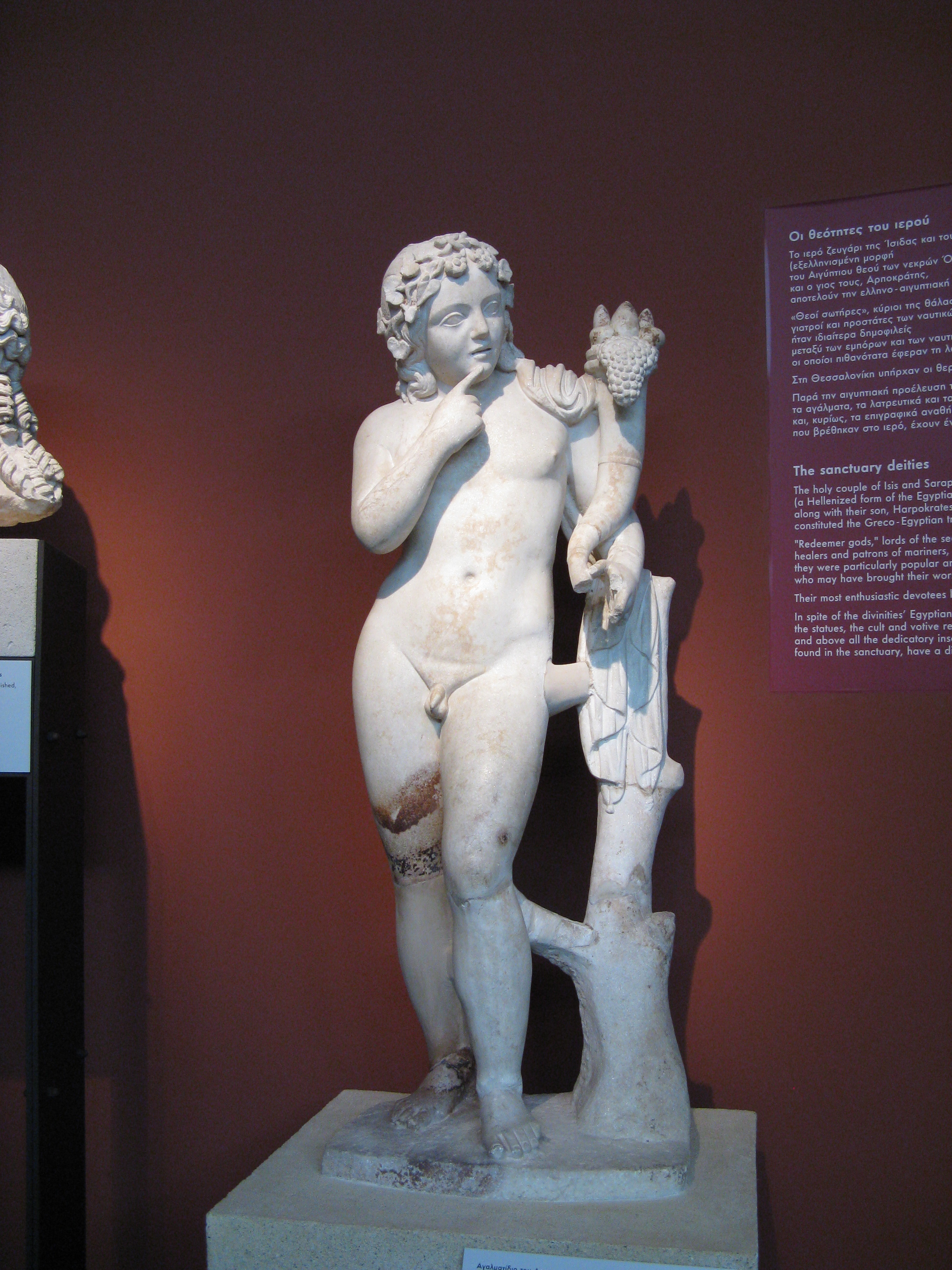
The statue of Harpocrates (Roman era).

The central rooms hold exhibits from the archaeological excavations conducted in Thessaloniki and the broader area of Macedonia. The new wing hosts two exhibitions: The Gold of Macedon, with artefacts from the cemeteries of Sindos, Agia Paraskevi, Nea Filadelfia, Makrygialos, Derveni, Lete, Serres, and Evropos; and The Thessaloniki Area in Prehistory, with material from prehistoric settlements, dating from the Neolithic to the Early and Late Bronze Age.

At present, the collection of Archaic to Late Roman sculptures from Thessaloniki and Macedonia in general is displayed in the central section of the museum. They illustrate the history of Thessaloniki from prehistoric times to Late Antiquity. These rooms display architectural members from an Ionic temple of the 6th century BC, sculptures of all periods from Macedonia, exhibits from the excavations in the palace complex built by Galerius in the Thessaloniki city centre, a reconstruction of the façade of the Macedonian tomb in Agia Paraskevi, with genuine architectural members, and finds (mainly gold artefacts) of the Archaic and Classical periods from the Sindos cemetery. In all these rooms, certain important exhibits have been singled out and further information about them is given to help visitors appreciate the importance of each exhibit and of the area and the period from which it comes.

Apart from its permanent displays, the Archaeological Museum also hosts major temporary and thematic exhibitions. In the Manolis Andronikos Room, for instance, there is an exhibition titled The Coins of Macedonia from the 6th Century to 148 BC, with examples of coins that were circulating in Macedonia in that period. A showcase in the lobby of the museum displays some finds from the excavation of the Neolithic settlement at Makrygialos in Pieria, accompanied by information about the progress of the excavation.

In the new wing, the Gold of Macedon exhibition includes finds from numerous excavations in Central Macedonia. Taking the history of gold as its central theme, it presents the culture of Macedonia from the 6th century BC to 148 BC, discussing the use of gold (jewellery, sartorial decoration, gilding of objects and vessels, coins), the technology of the manufacture of gold jewellery, and the techniques of gold mining. There are also numerous finds from cemeteries and there are many descriptions about their role in burial customs.

The Thessaloniki in Prehistory exhibition aims to recreate a picture of the Thermaic Gulf littoral before the city of Thessaloniki was built. It presents the first excavations, which were carried out during the First World War by British and French troops, and finds from the most important prehistoric settlements in the area (Thermi, Vassilika, Stavroupoli, Oraiokastro, Assiros, Toumba, and Kastana) divided into three chronological groups (Neolithic, Early and Late Bronze Age).

=== Discovery of possible original statue of Alexander ===
On 26 February 2010, Greek authorities arrested two men found in illegal possession of various antiquities, including a bronze statue of Alexander, which is possibly a work of Lysippos. If confirmed, this would make it the first original work of Lysippos ever discovered. The statue is currently being examined at the laboratory of the museum, which is expected to confirm or deny its authenticity.

== Notable exhibits ==
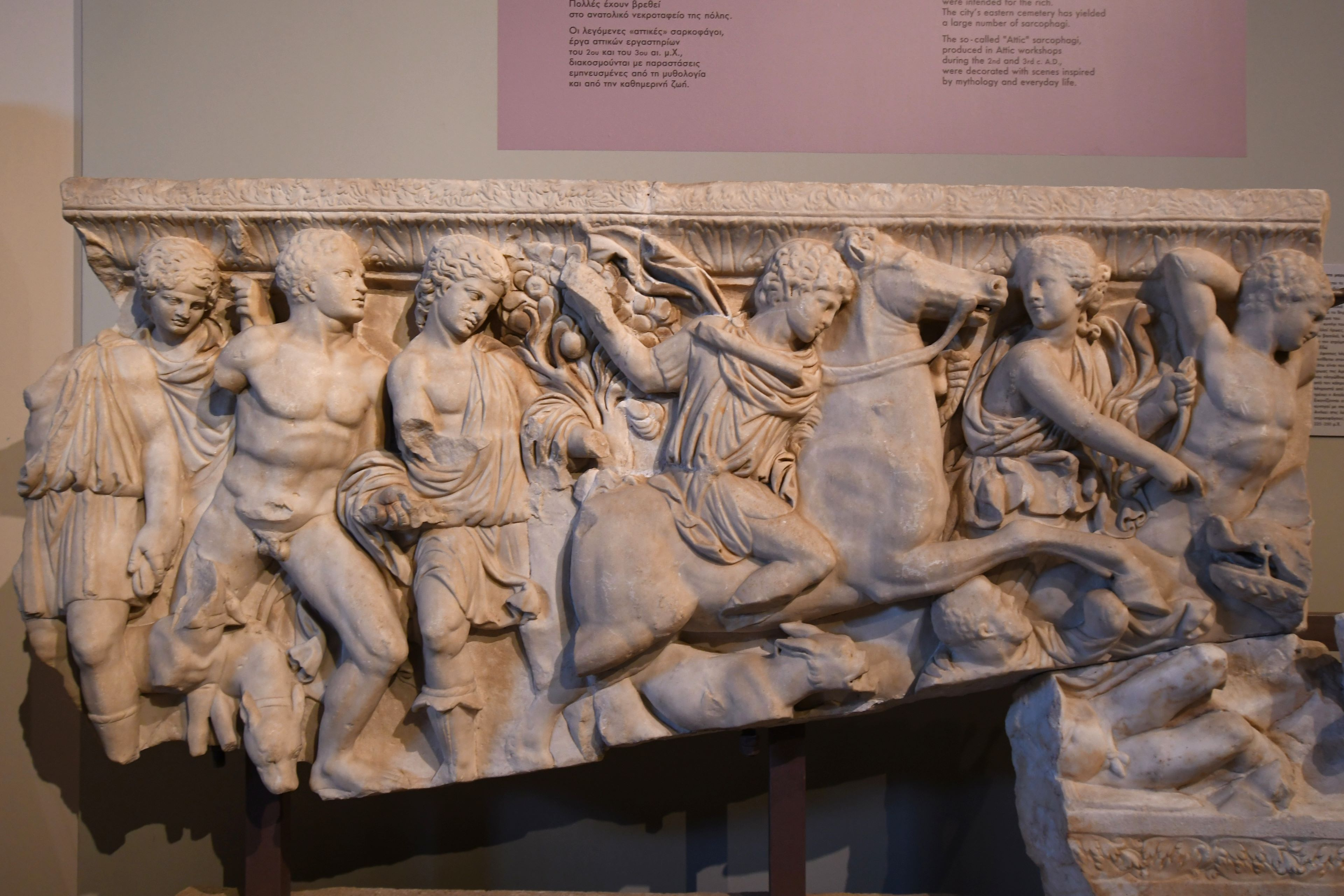
Fragments of a marble sarcophagus depicting the Caledonian boar-hunt.

- Derveni krater
- The statue of Harpocrates (2nd century AD)
- The Head of Serapis (2nd century BC)
- Bronze helmet and gold mask (cemetery of Sindos, end of 6th century BC)
- Marble door (Macedonia tomb of Agia Paraskevi)
- Copy of "Unveiling" Aphrodite (421/420 BC)
- Gold medals (250–225 BC)
- Inlaid floors (mosaic)
- Gold diadems, gold disks and gold Medusa heads (350-325 BC)
- Derveni Papyrus (end of 5th century BC)
- Plaster castings of Las Incantadas (the originals are in the Louvre)

== Gallery ==
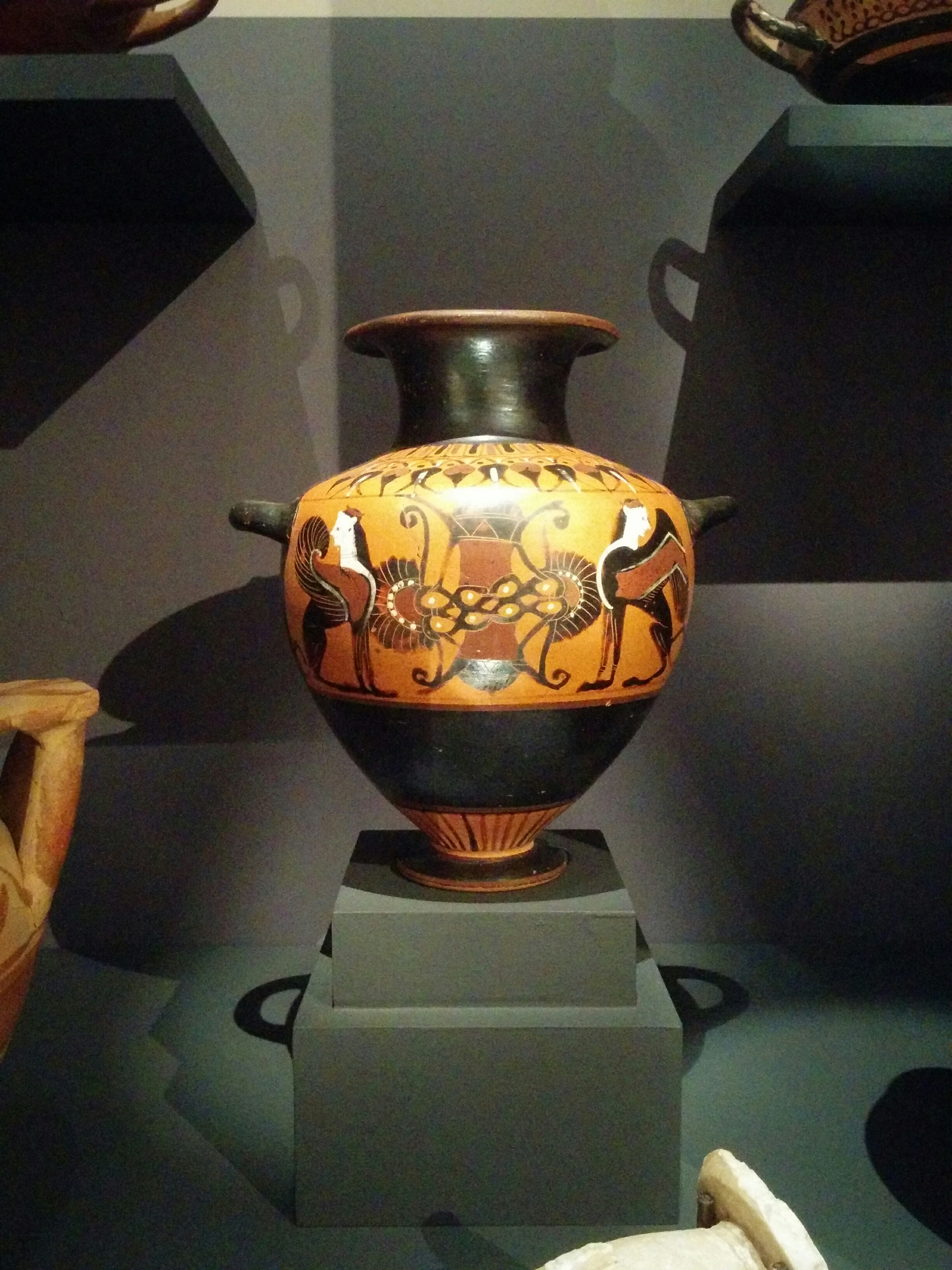
Red figure pottery (4th BC)

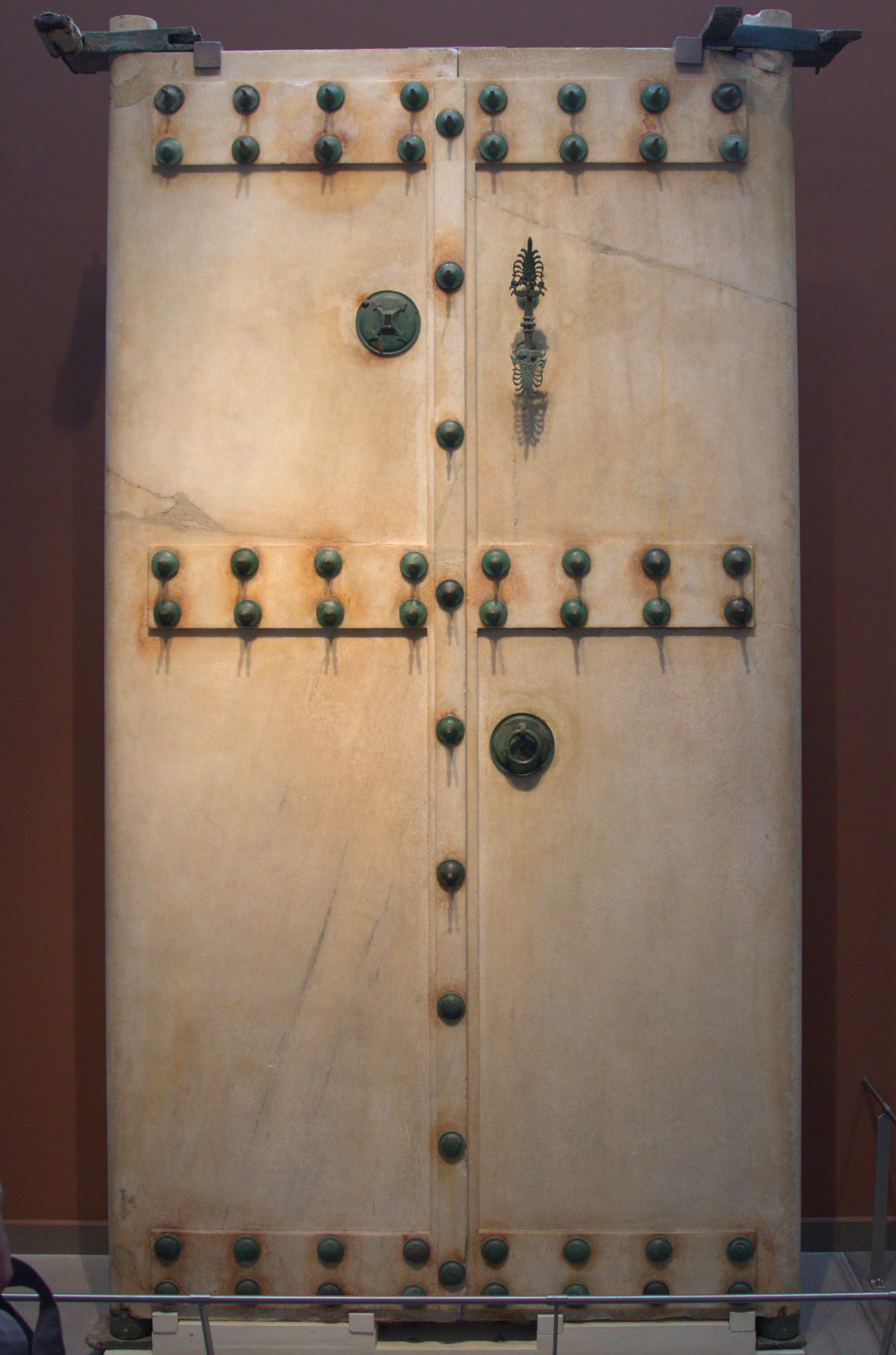
Facade of an ancient Macedonian tomb (4th BC); 6.5m long, 4m wide and 4.8m high

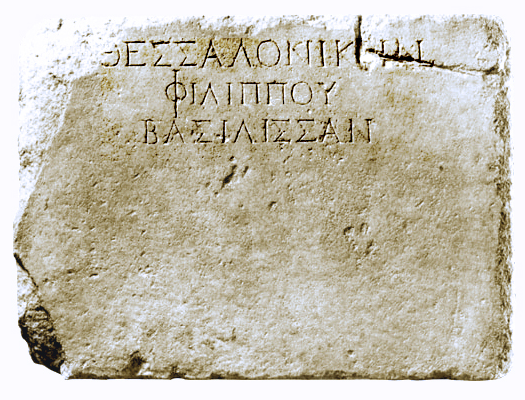
Inscription reading: "To Queen Thessalonike, (Daughter) of Philip"

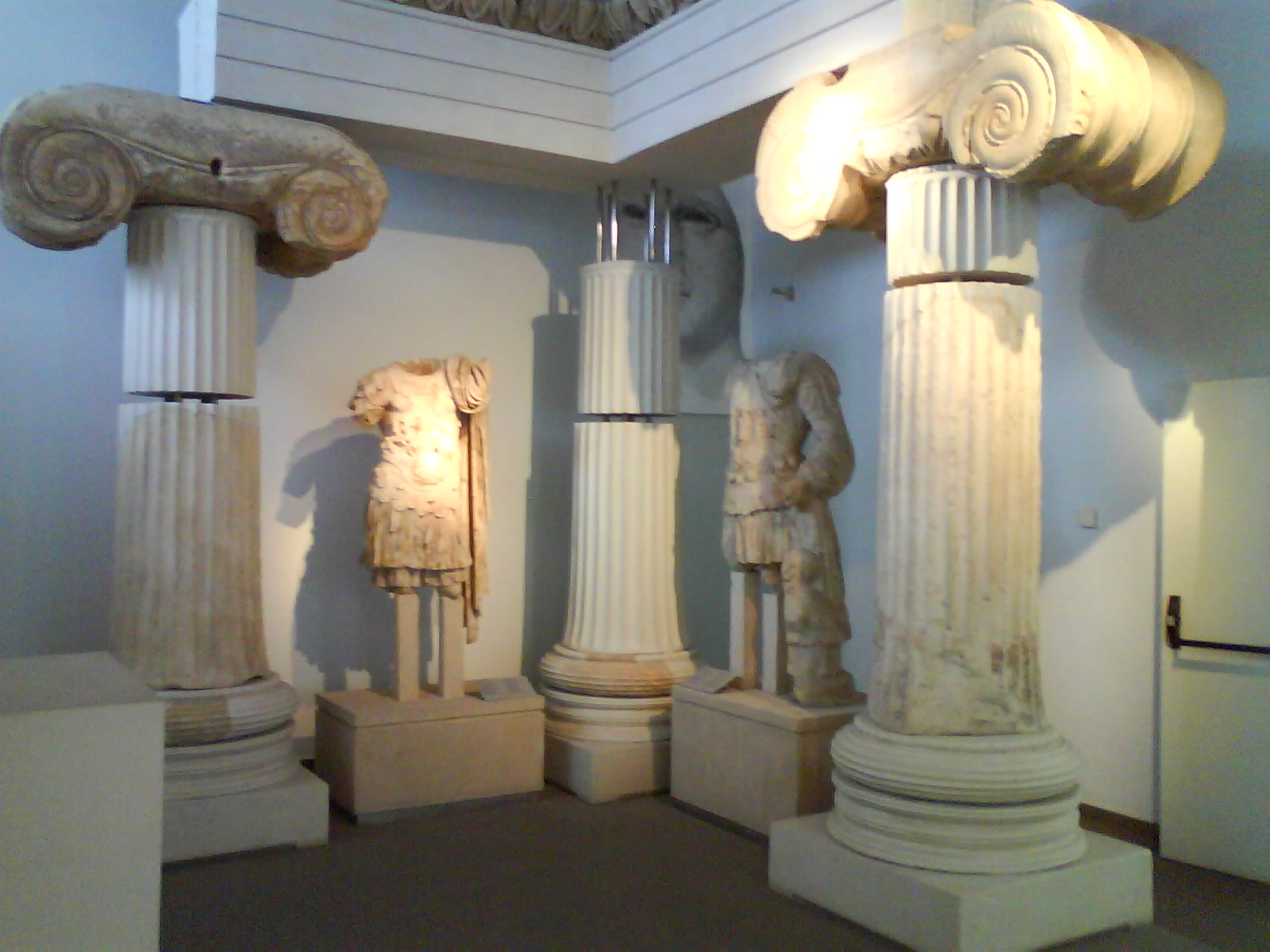
Restored parts from the Temple of Aphrodite, located in Thessaloniki, almost completely buried

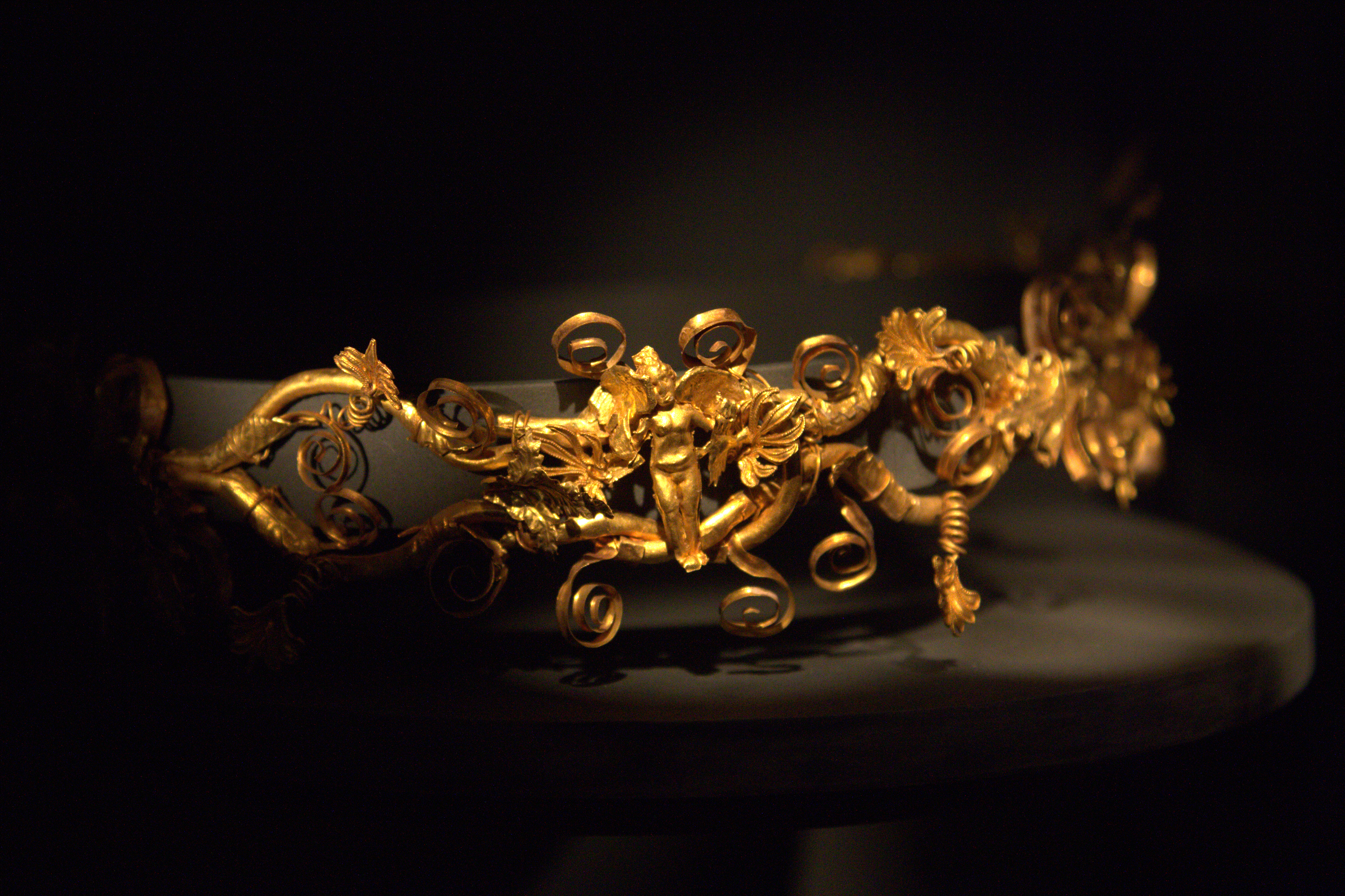
Gold diadem consisting of 8 lyre-shaped sections, decorated with acanthus leaves, tendrills and palmettes (320-300 BC)

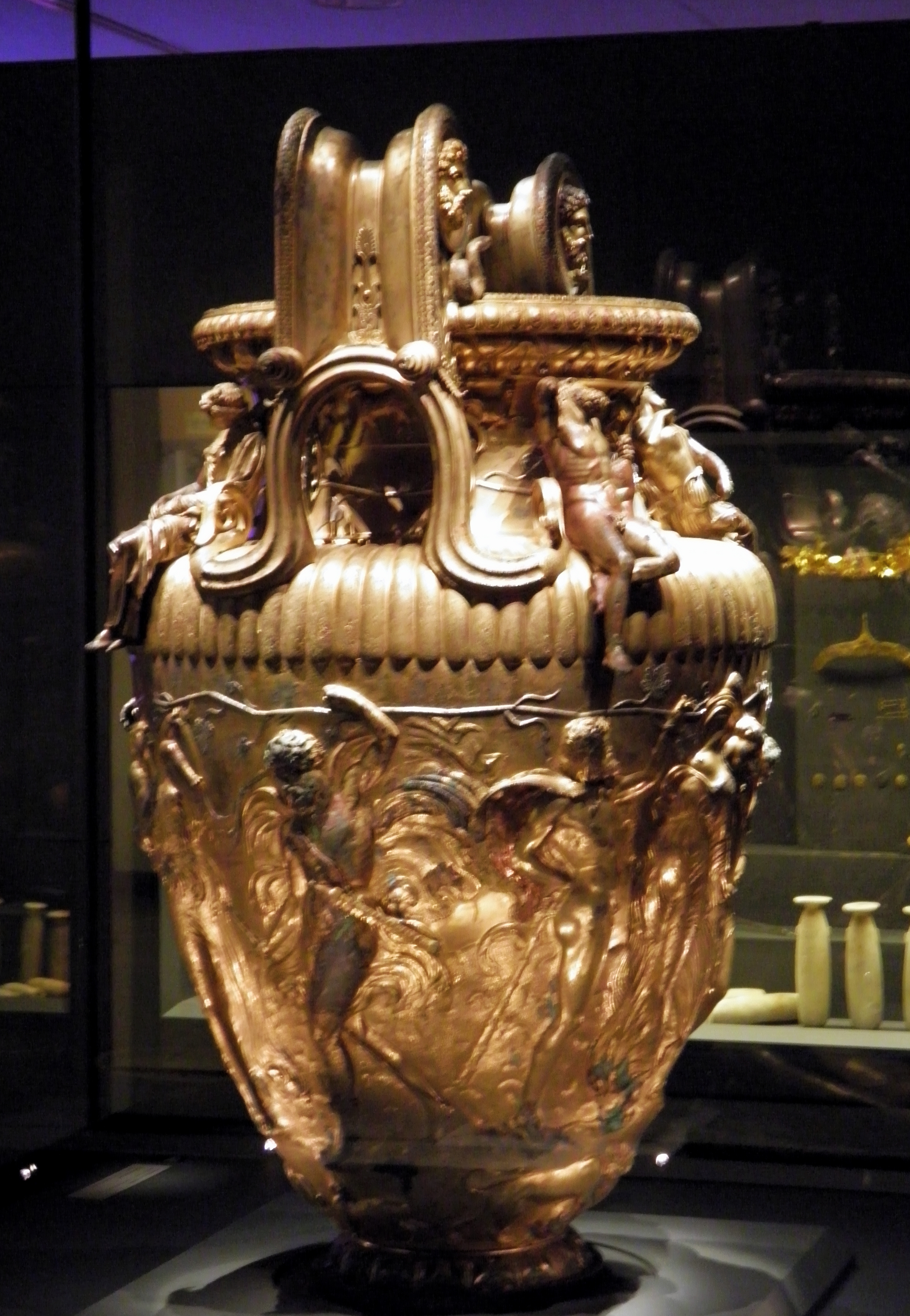
The Derveni Krater (vase for mixing wine and water)

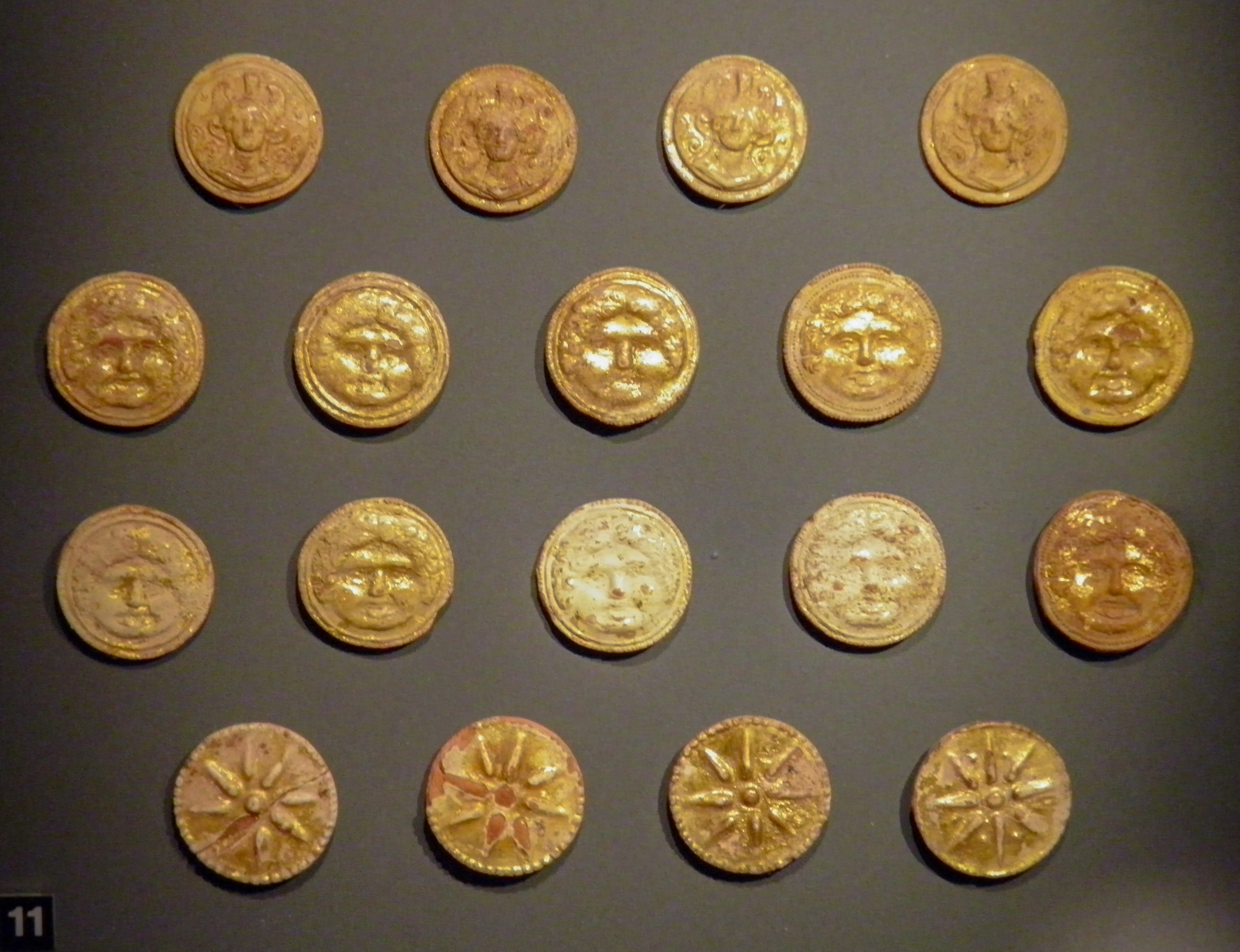
Macedonian coins

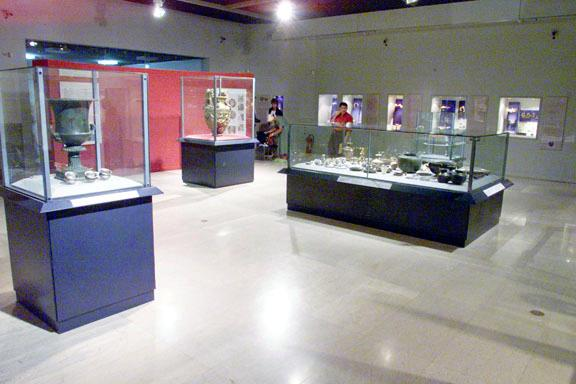
Exhibition of the "Gold of Macedon"

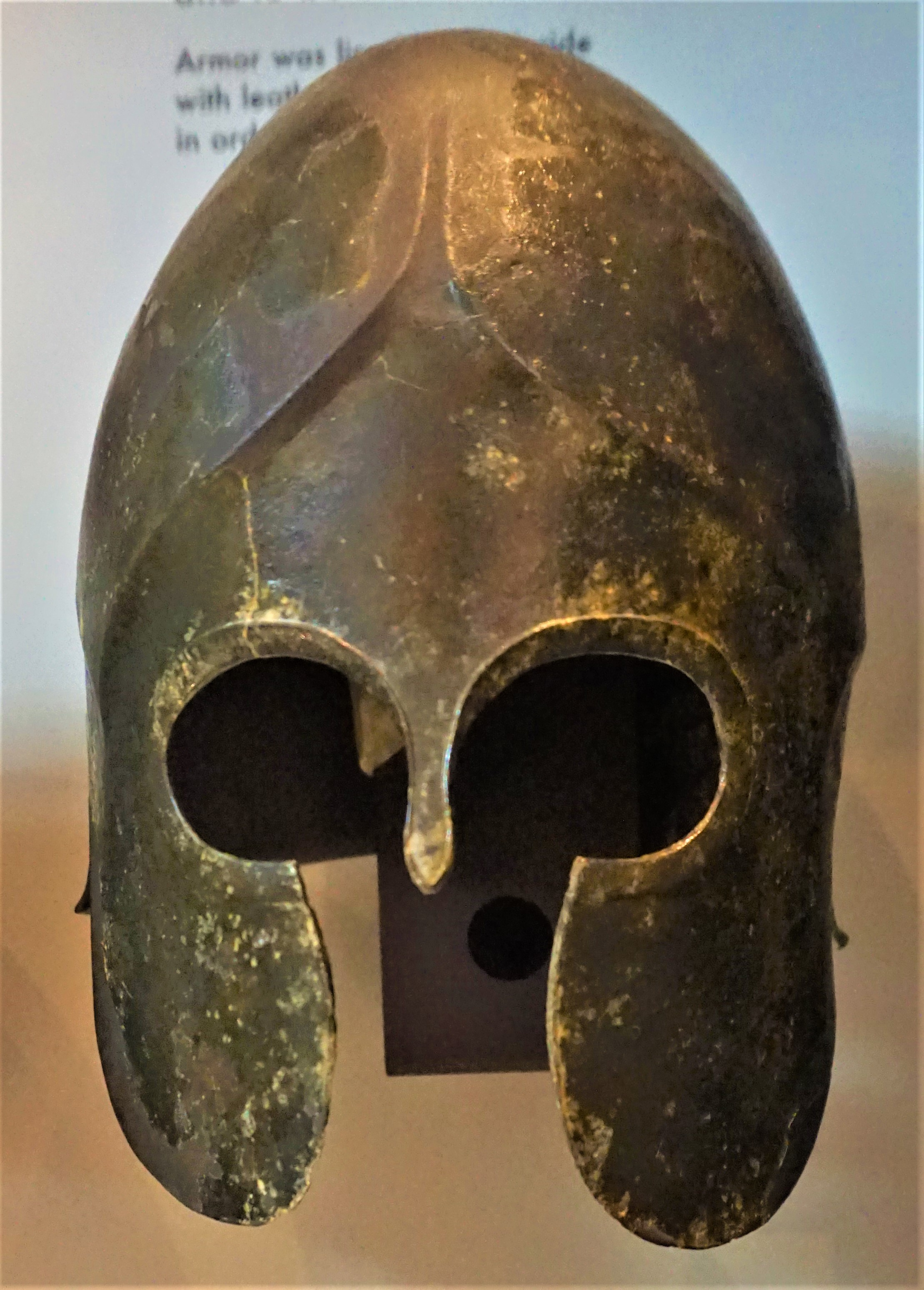
Macedonian helmet

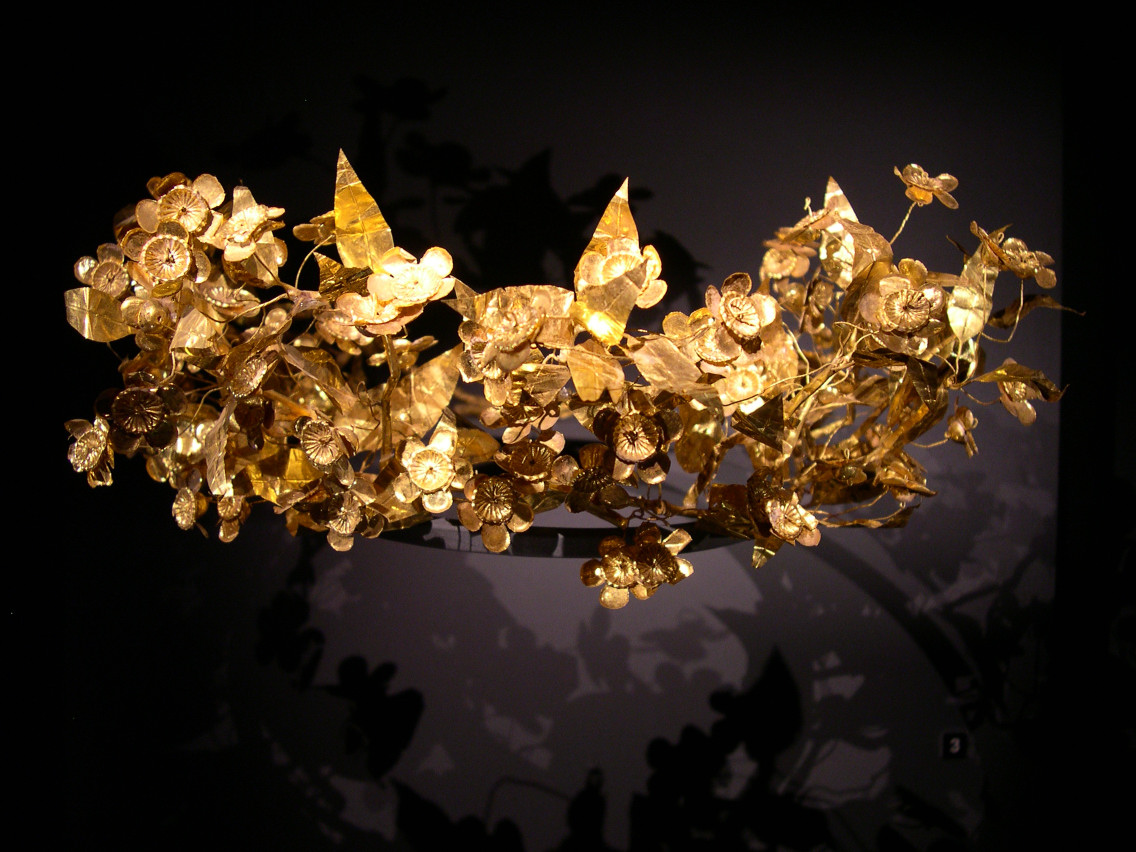
Macedonian golden wreath

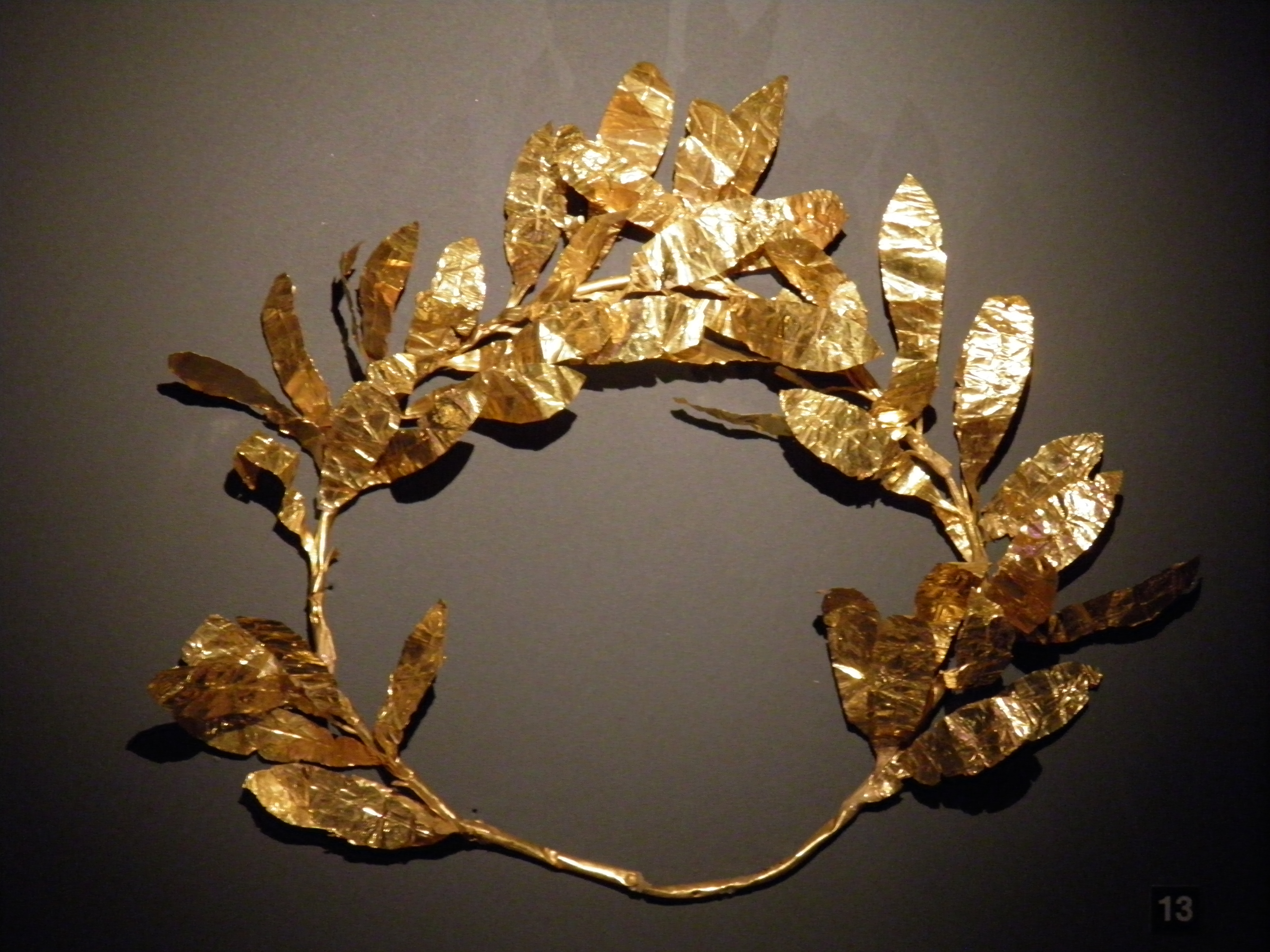
Another golden wreath

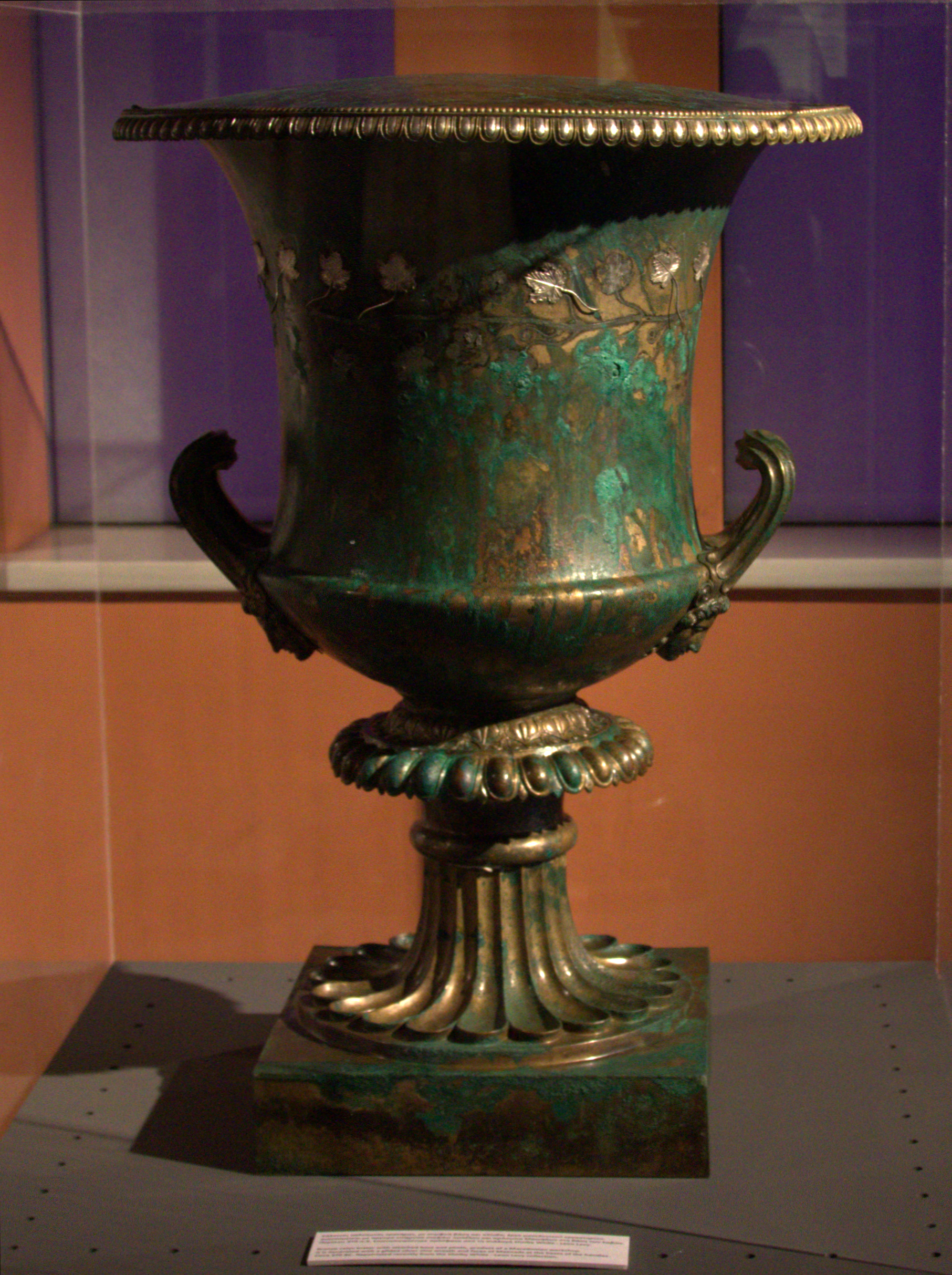
Bronze calyx krater

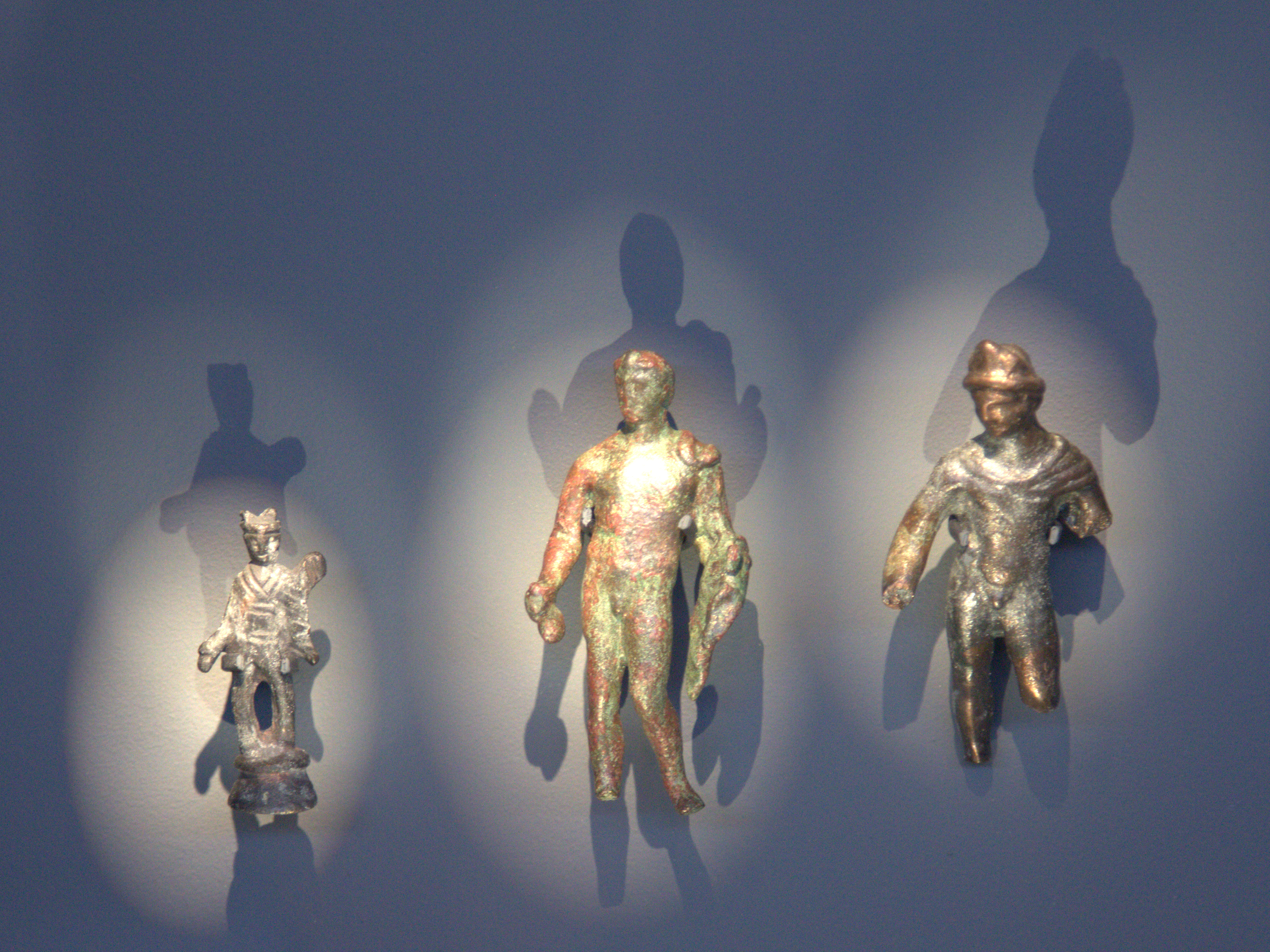
Bronze figurines of Hermes and Heracles

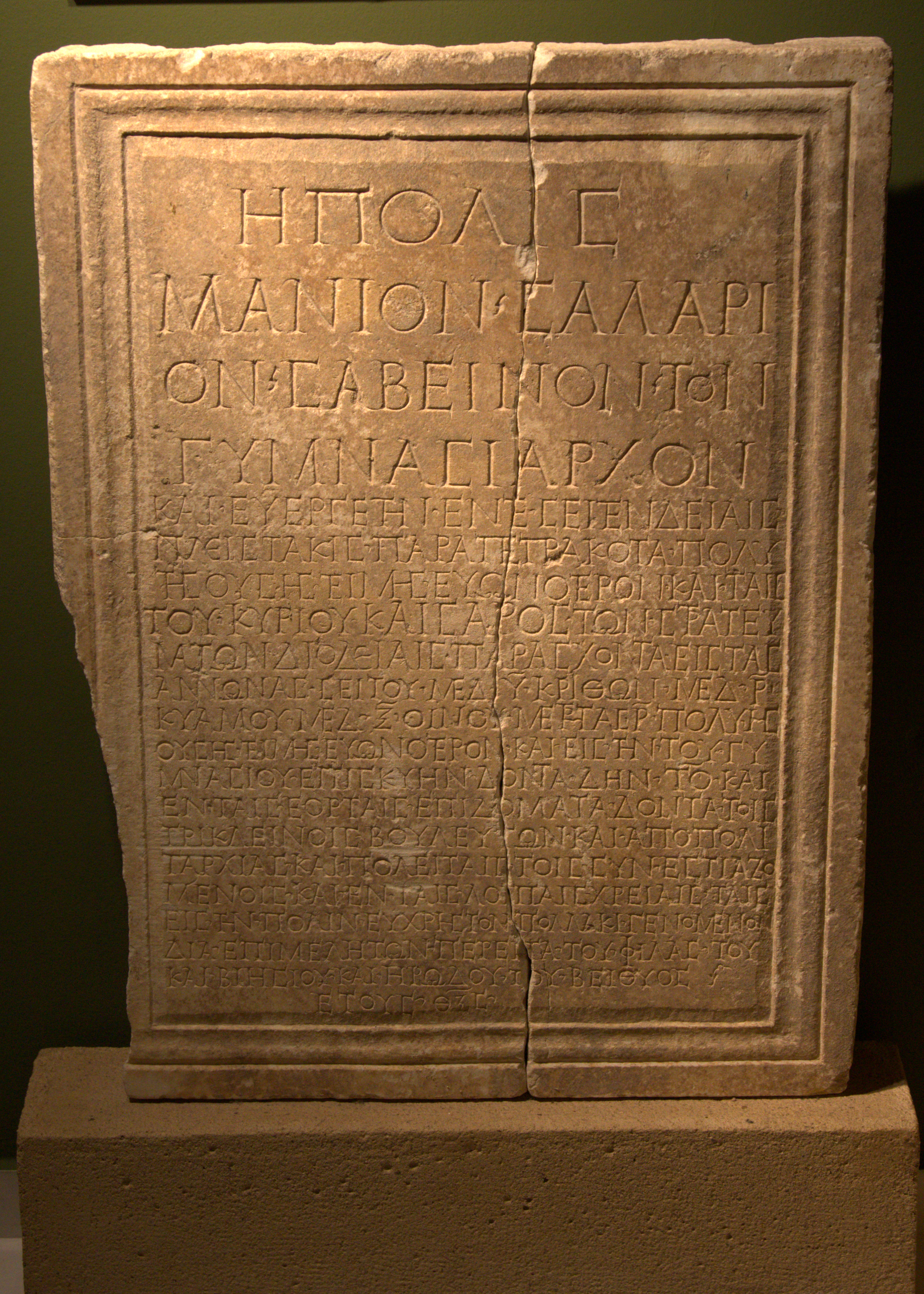
Votaive plaque (1st BC)

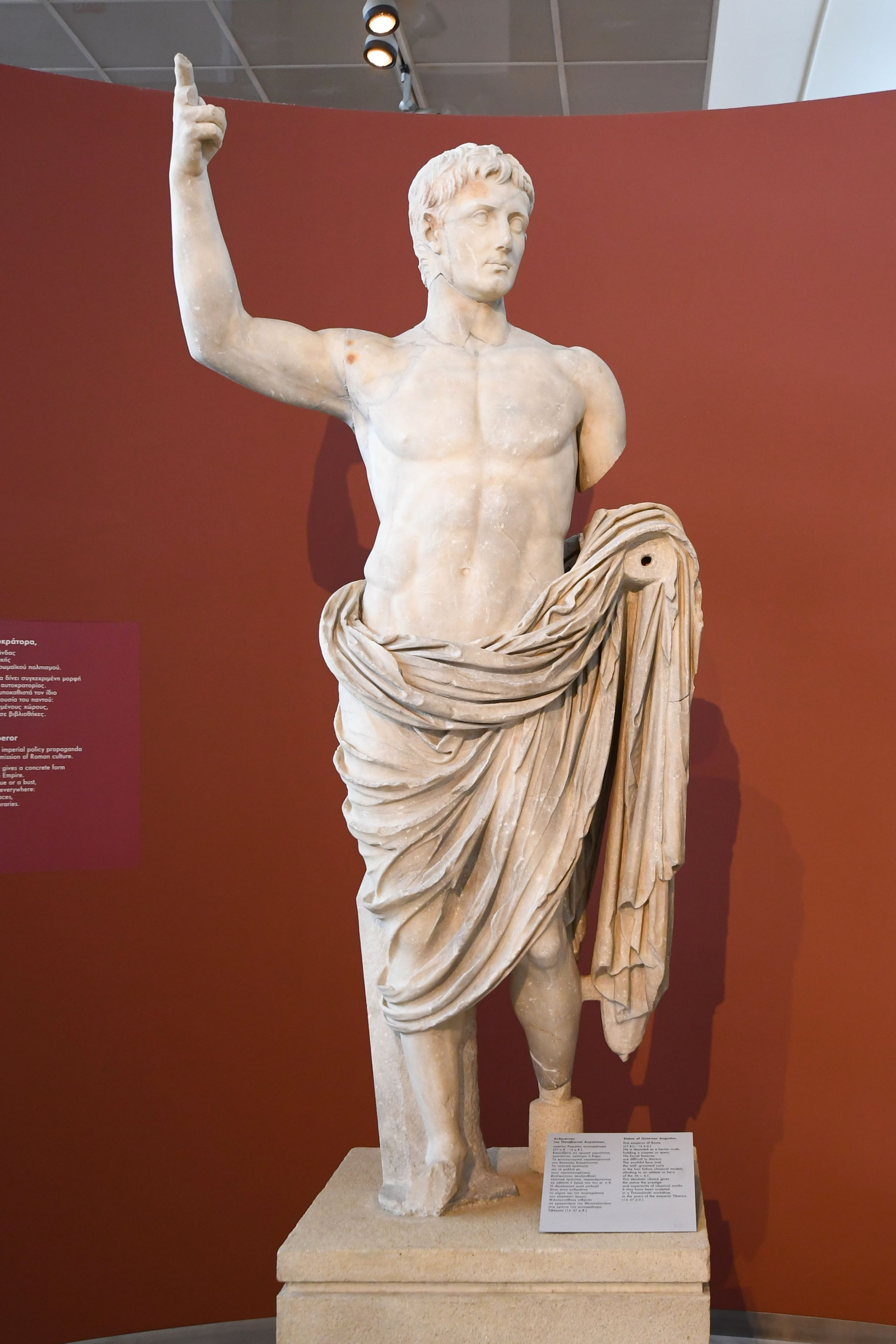
Marble statue of Augustus (Roman period)

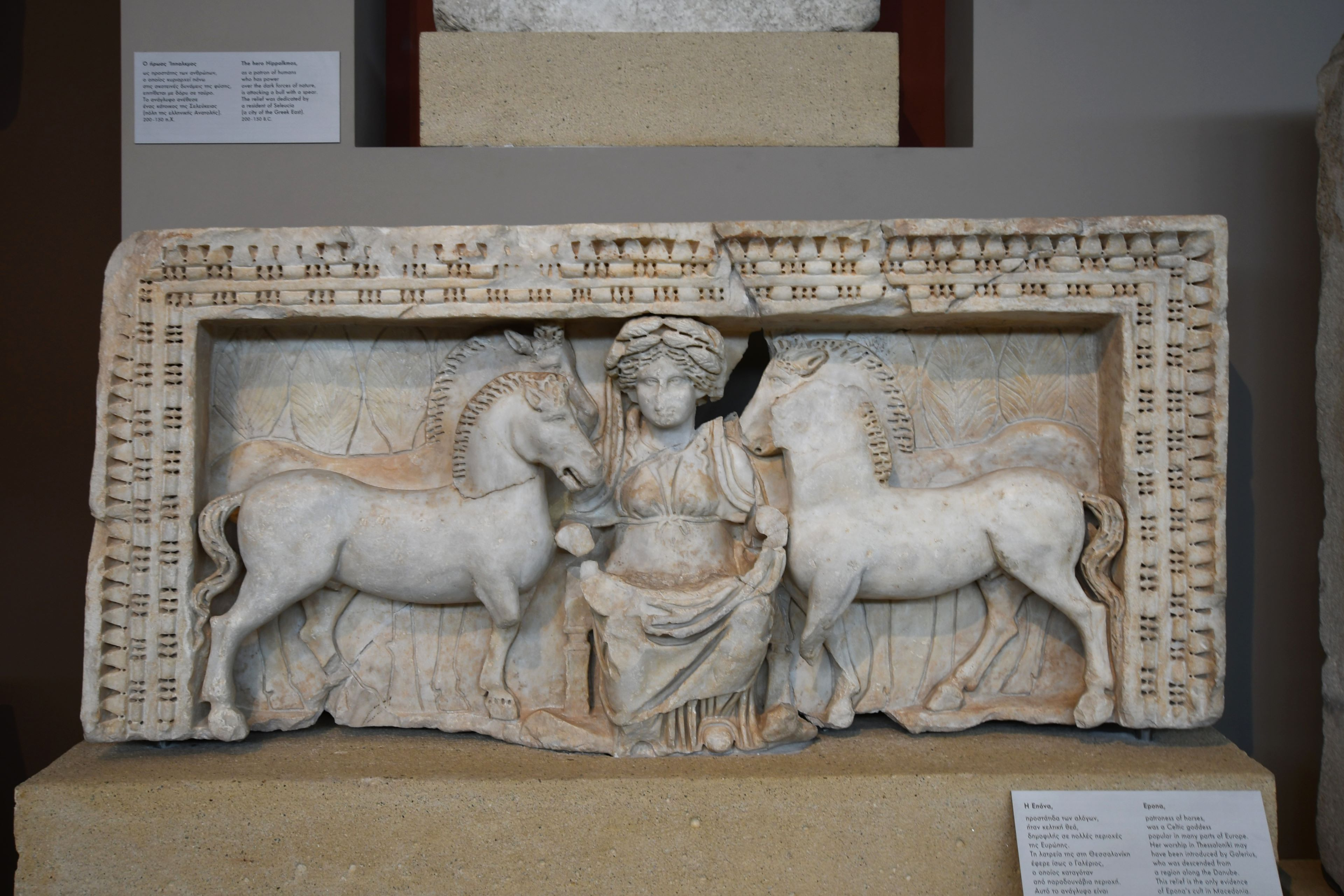
Epona, patroness of horses. Celtic goddess, may have been introduced in Thessaloniki by Galerius

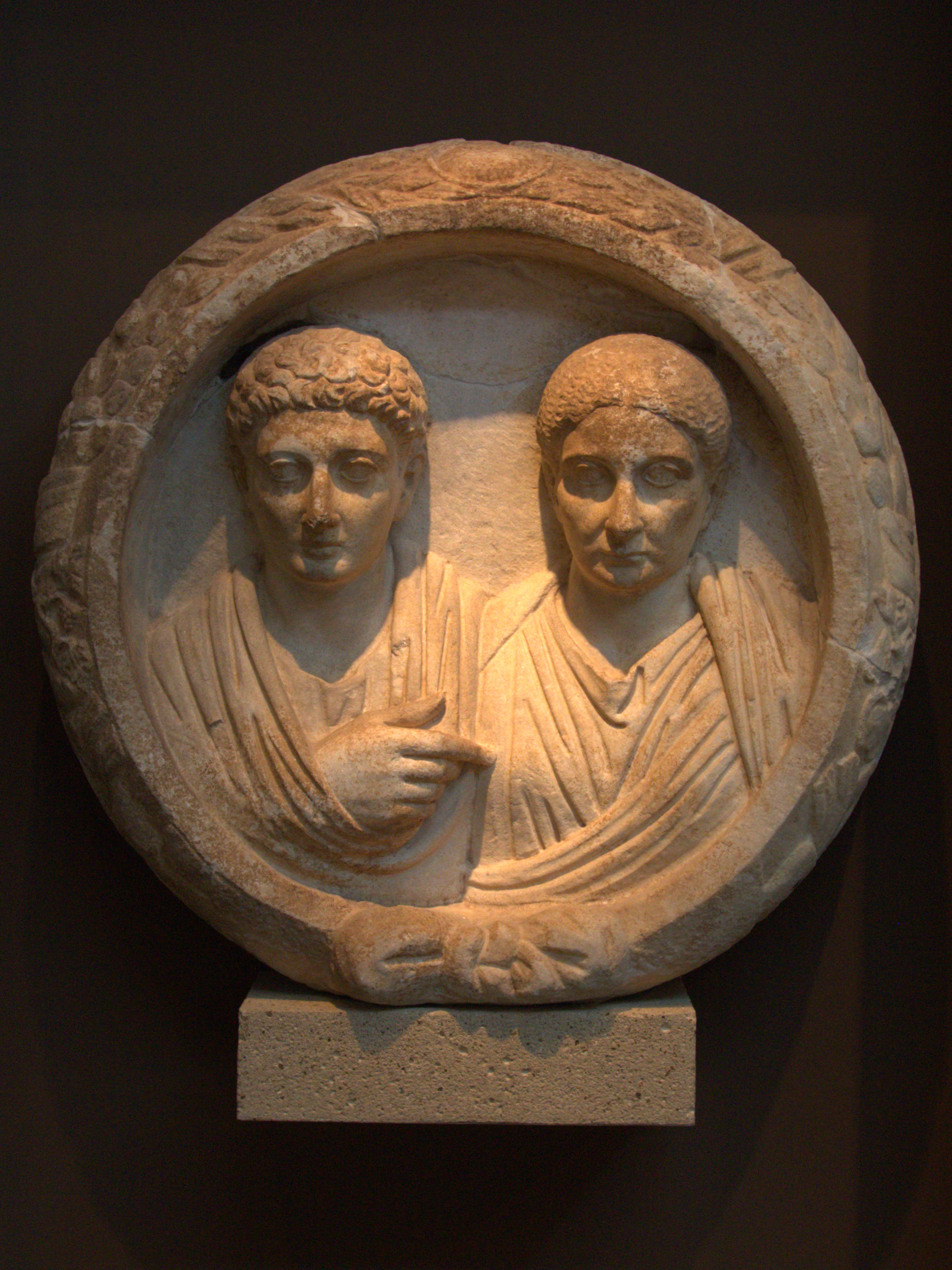
Funerary relief depicting a family (1st AD)

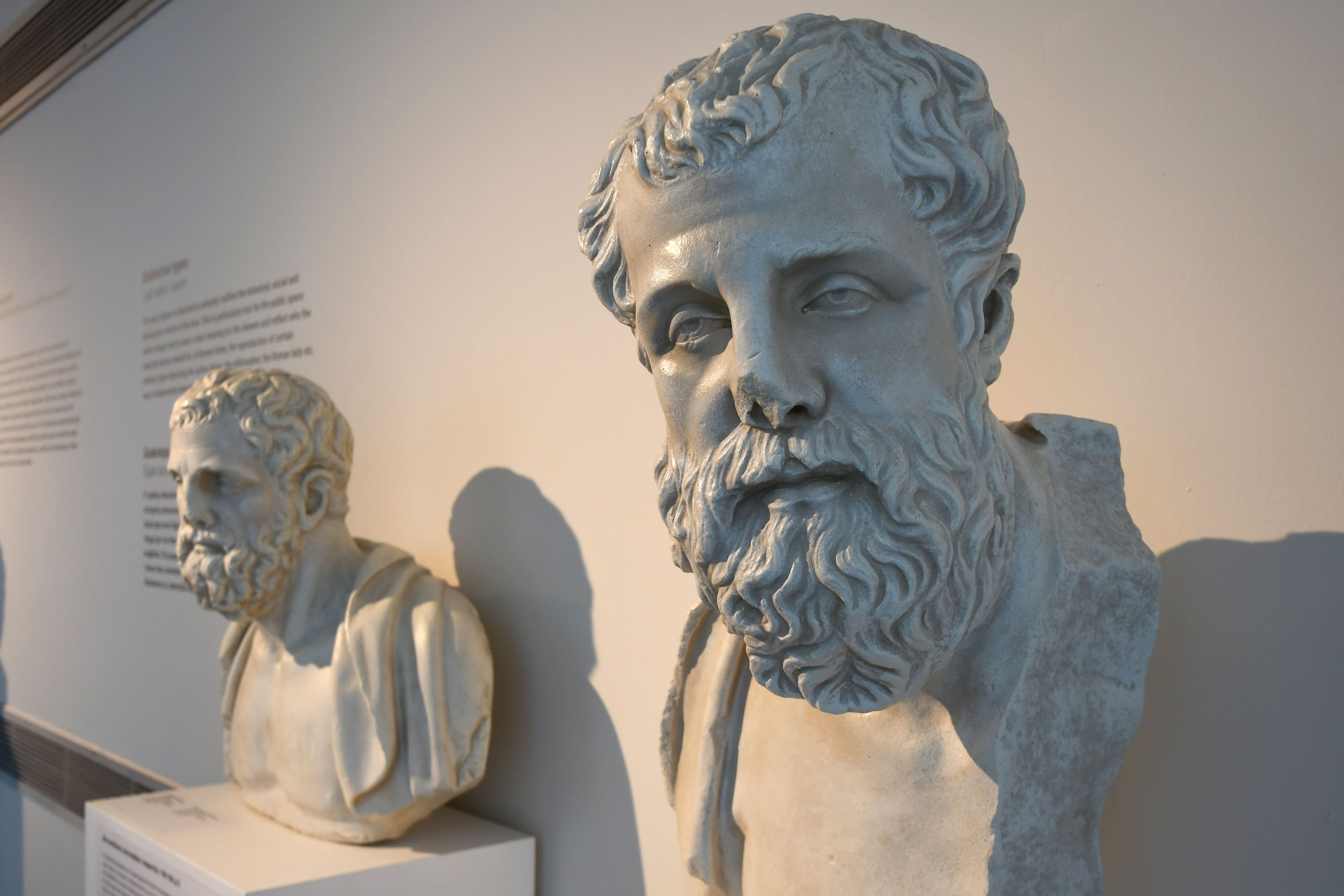
Philosopher (150-60 AD)

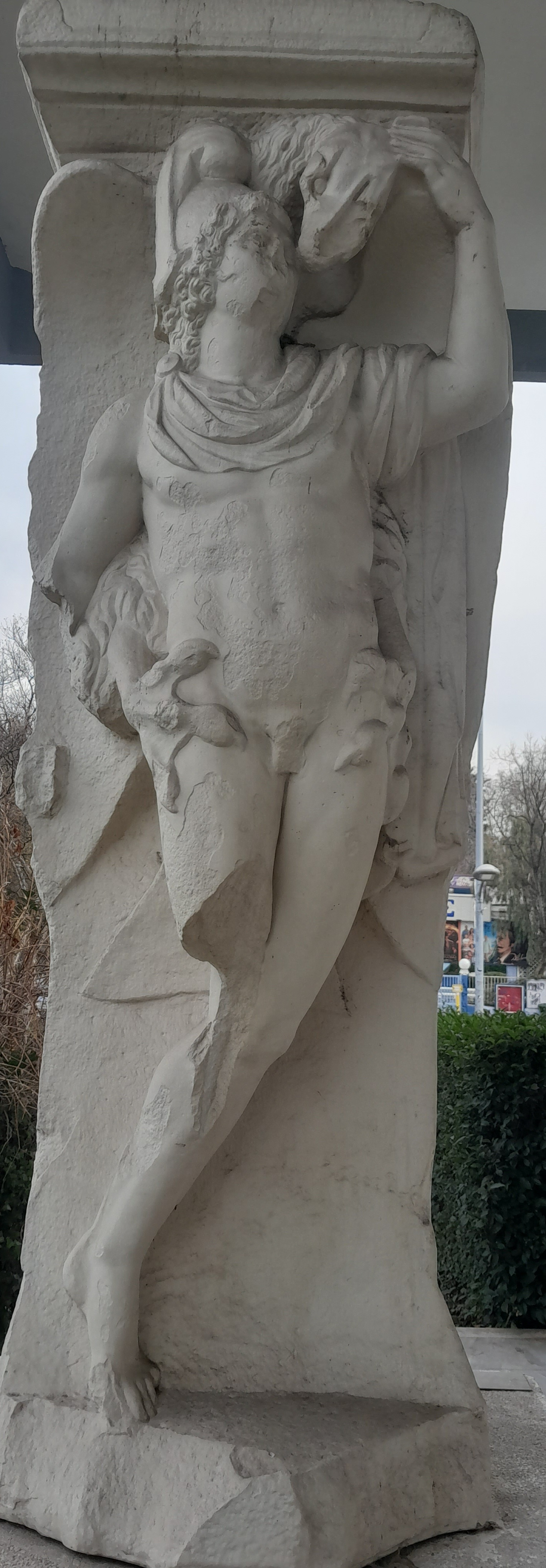
Ganymede of Las Incantadas (plaster cast)

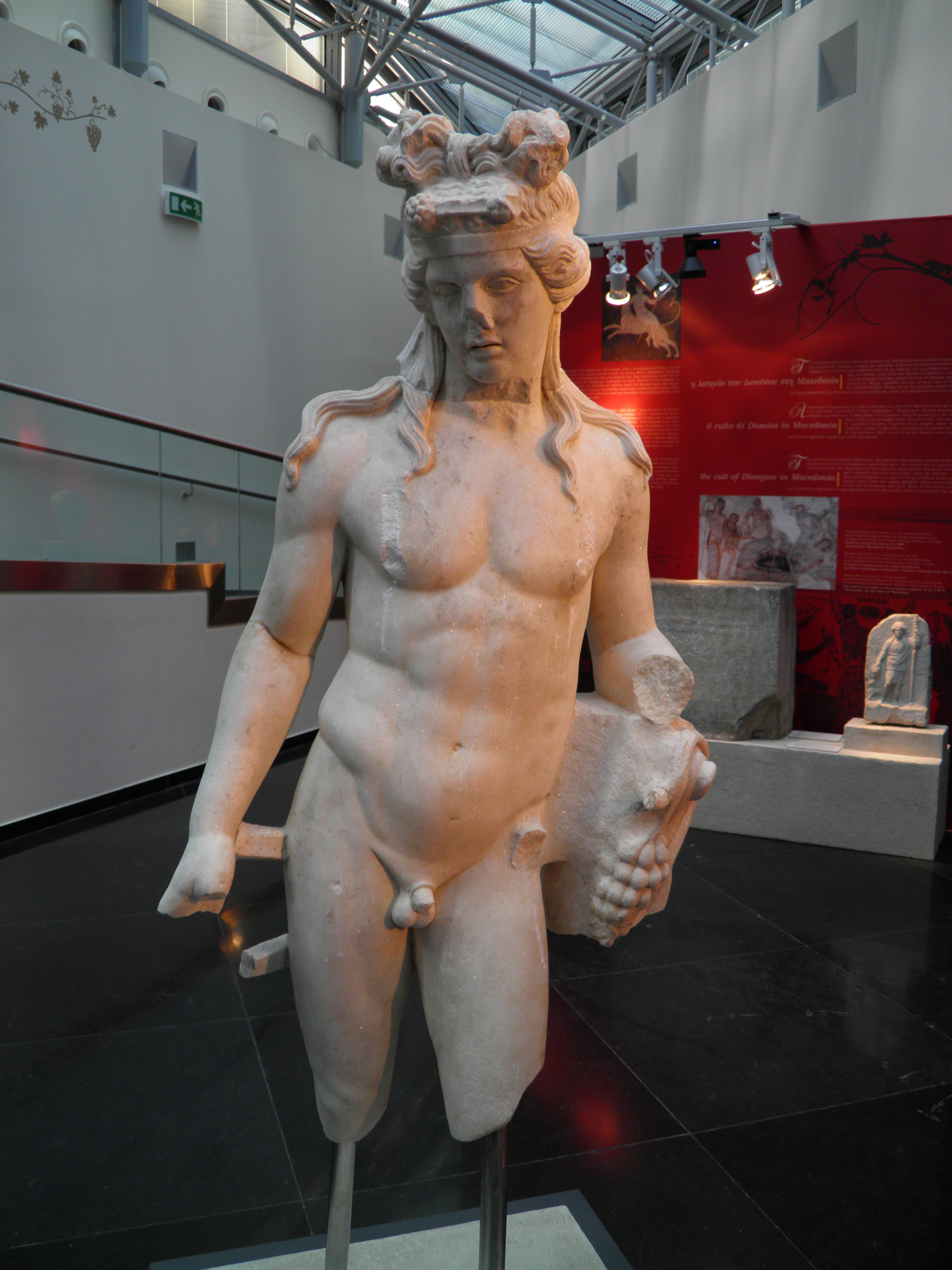
Marble statue of Dionysus (2nd AD)

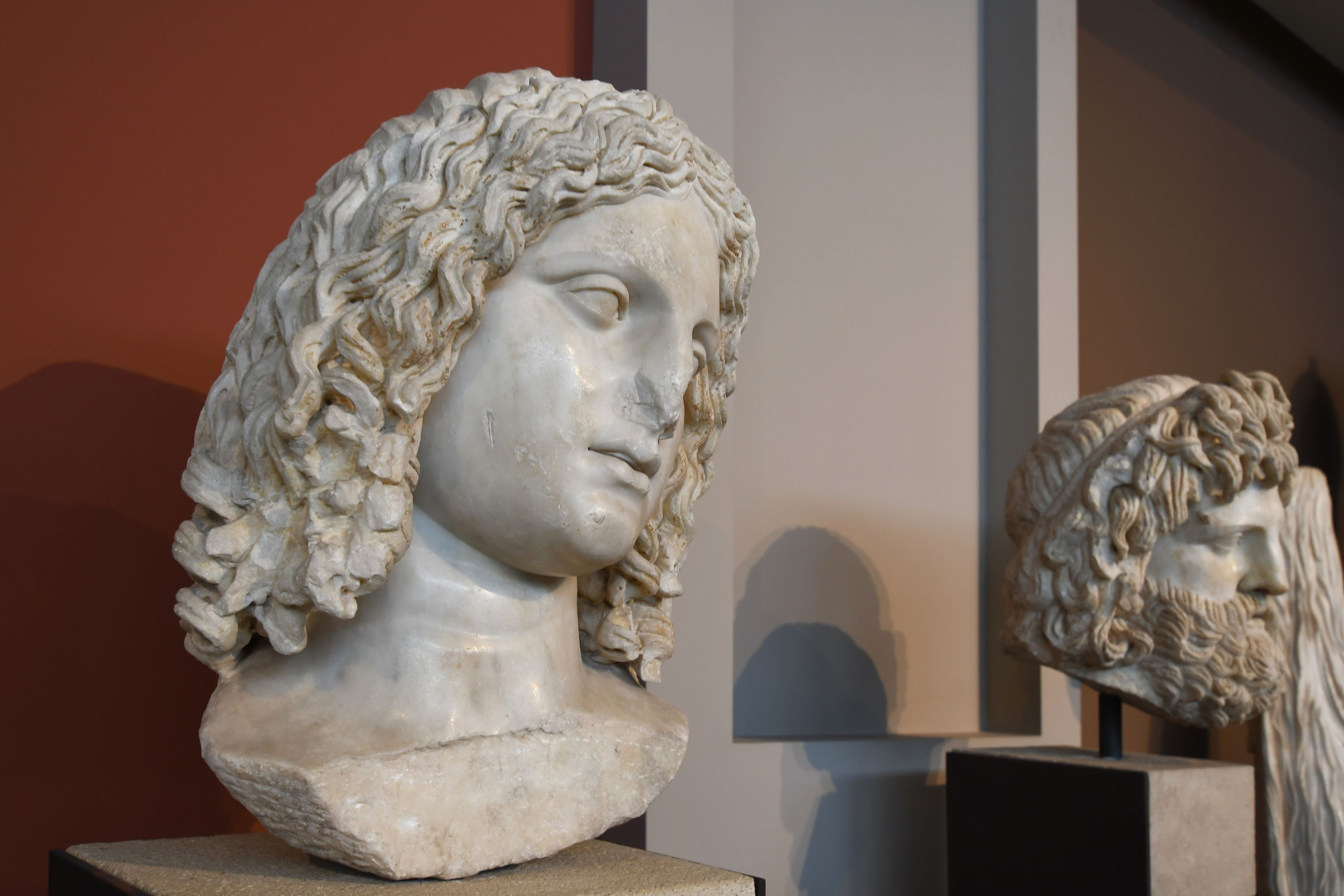
Head thought to be a portrait of Alexander The Great (175-200 AD)

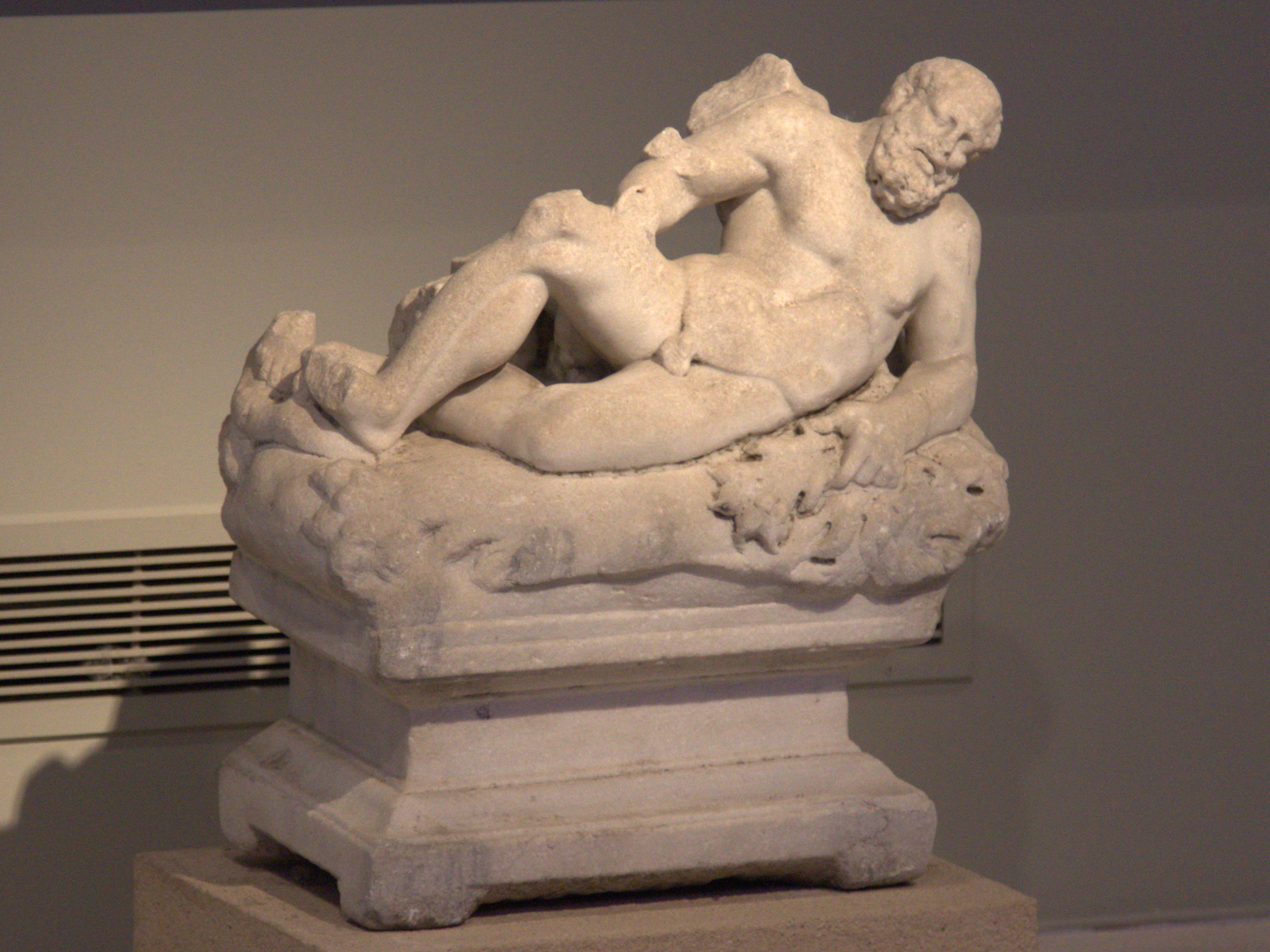
Dionysiac composition (200-250 AD)

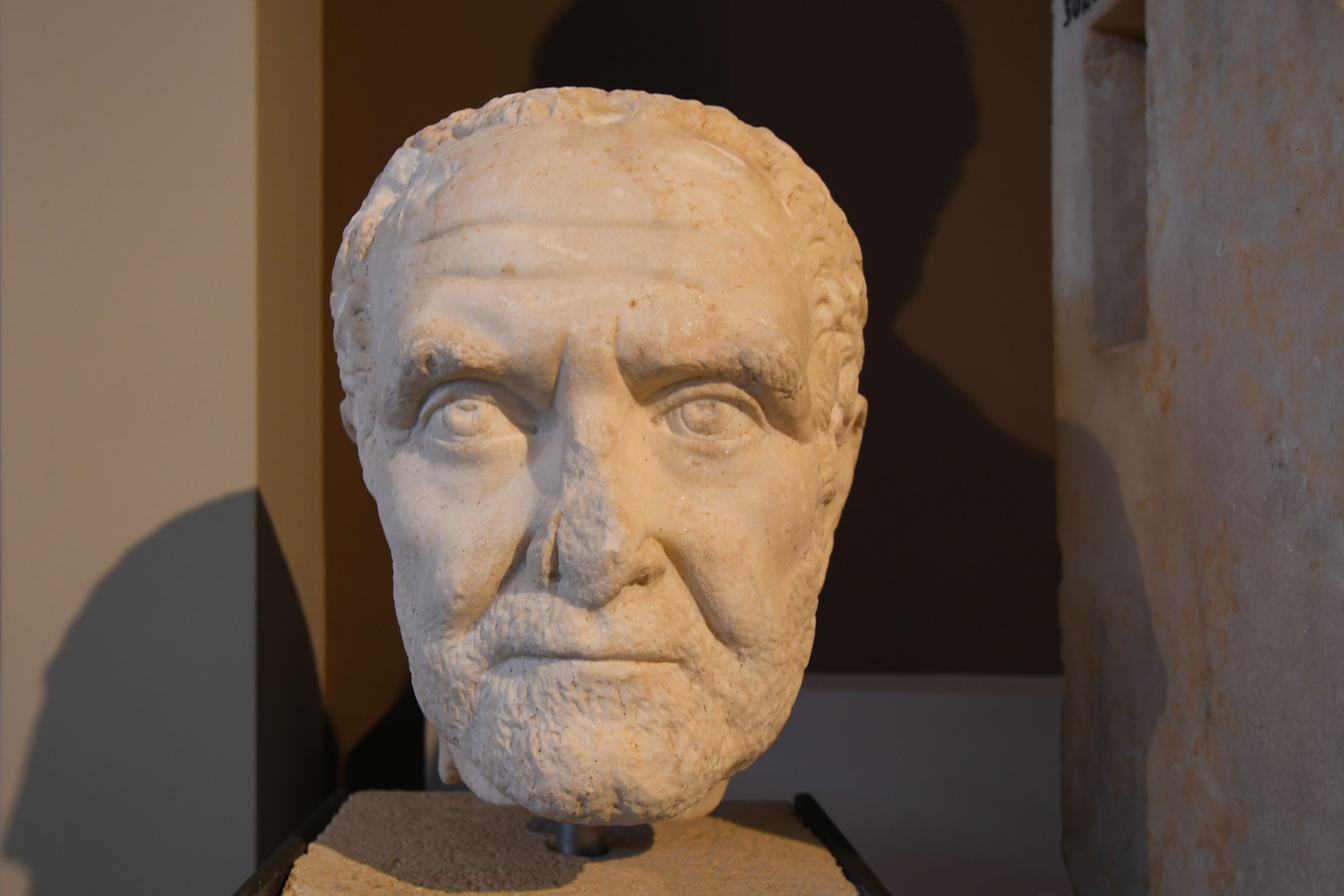
Head of an old man (3rd AD)

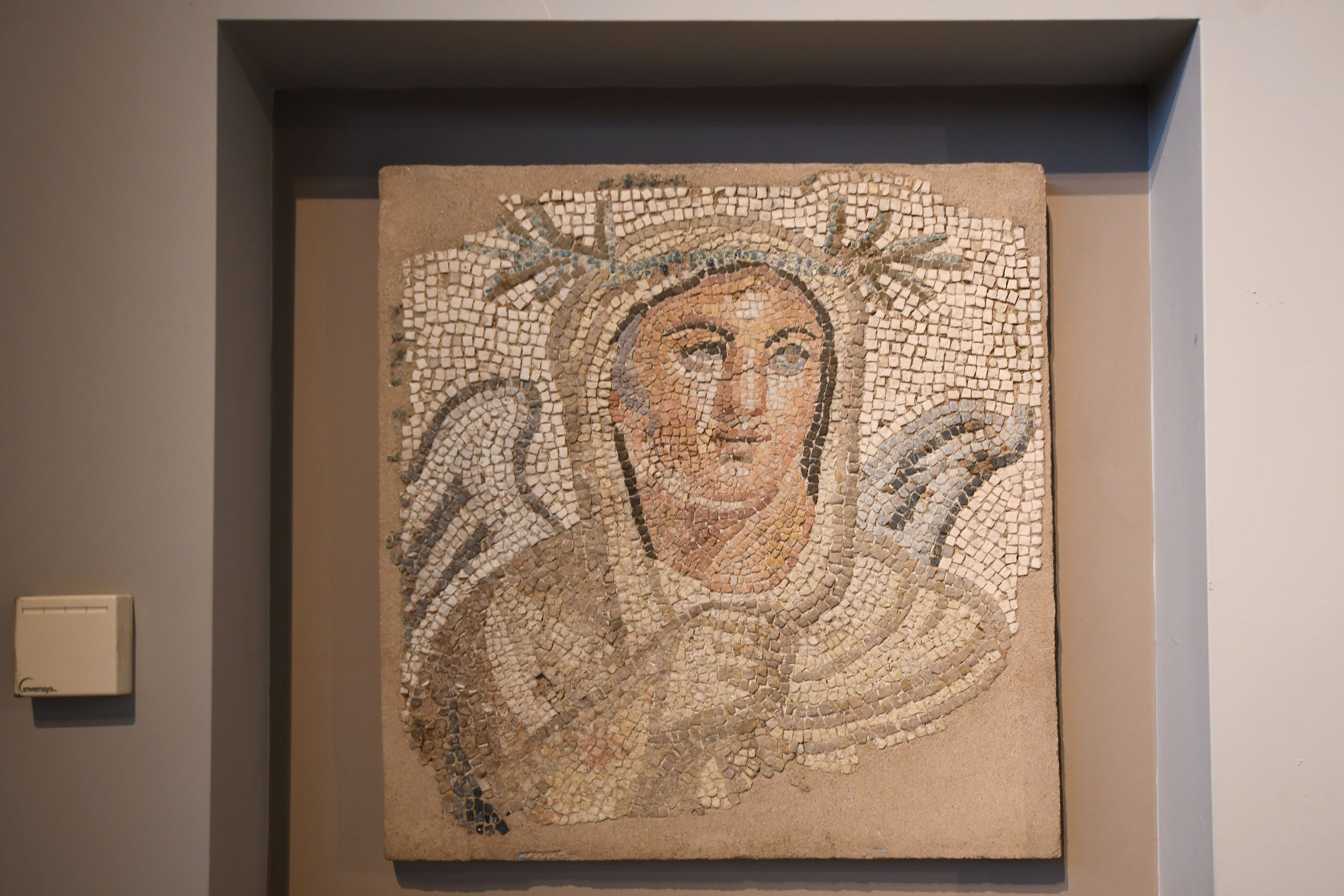
Mosaic depicting "Winter" (3rd AD)

== See also ==
- List of museums in Greece
