= Patroklos Karantinos =

Greek architect

Patroklos Karantinos Πάτροκλος Καραντινός
- Born: 10 April 1903; Constantinople, Ottoman Empire
- Died: 4 December 1976 (aged 73); Athens, Greece
- Occupation: architect

Patroklos Karantinos (Greek: Πάτροκλος Καραντινός; 10 April 1903 – 4 December 1976) was a Greek architect of early modernism in Greece. He was born in Constantinople and died in Athens.

Karantinos studied architecture in Athens and then went to France, where he studied with Auguste Perret. He was professor of architecture at the Aristotle University of Thessaloniki from 1959 to 1968. He is particularly known for the design of many museums in Greece, including the Archaeological Museum of Thessaloniki and the Heraklion Archaeological Museum. His work was part of the architecture event in the art competition at the 1948 Summer Olympics.

== See also ==
- List of museums in Greece
