= Derveni, Thessaloniki =

Archeological site in Greece

Coordinates: 40°43′13″N 22°58′17.2″E

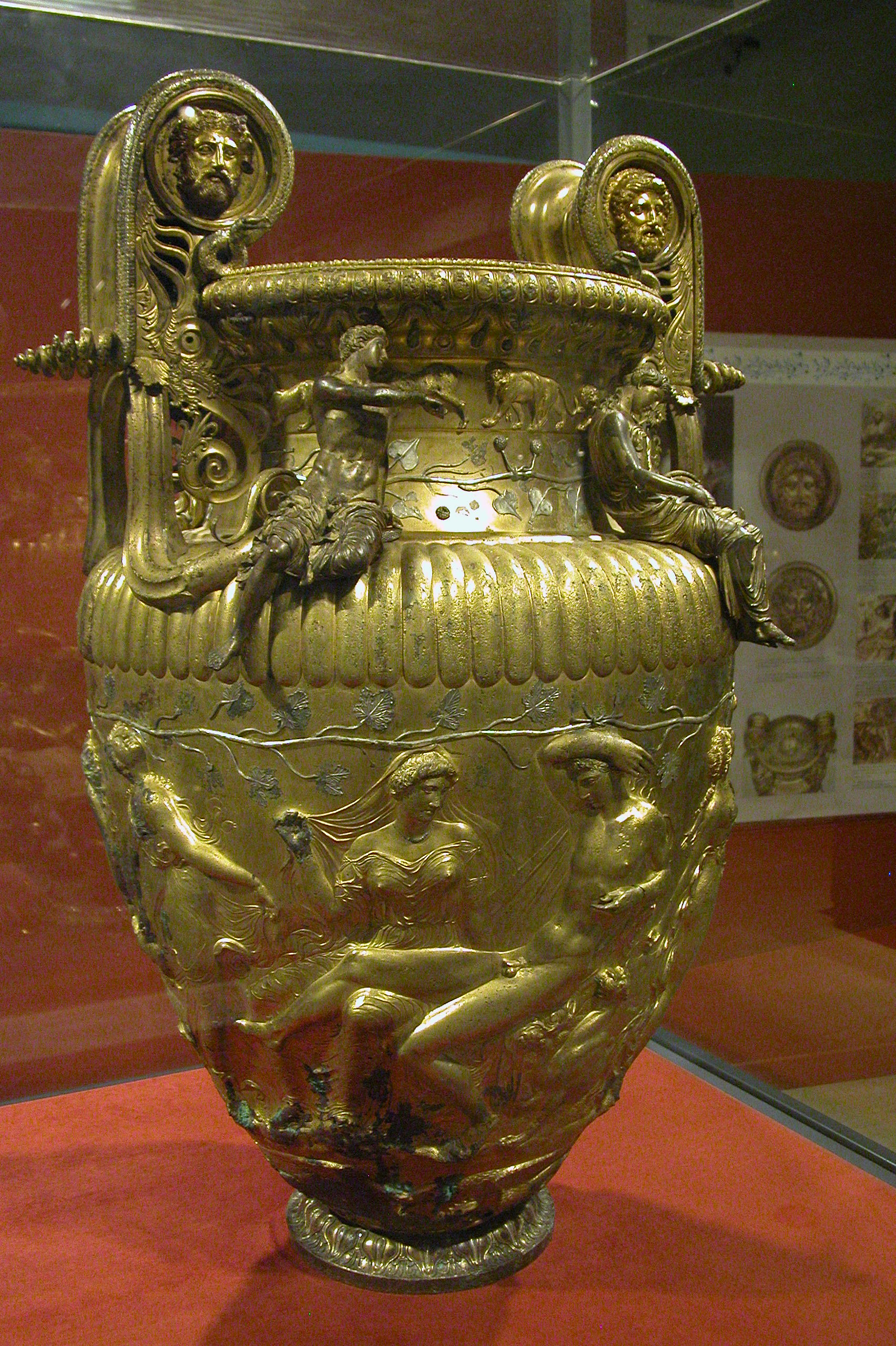
Derveni krater, height : 90.5 cm at the Archaeological Museum of Thessaloniki

Derveni (Greek: Δερβένι) is a location in Mygdonia, Greece, between Efkarpia and Lagyna, approximately ten kilometers north-east of Thessaloniki. At Derveni an archeological site is located where a necropolis was discovered, part of a cemetery of the ancient city of Lete. Valuable artifacts were uncovered at this site, including the Derveni papyrus and Derveni krater.
