= Derveni papyrus =

Oldest surviving European manuscript (c. 340 BC)

- Archaeological Museum of Thessaloniki
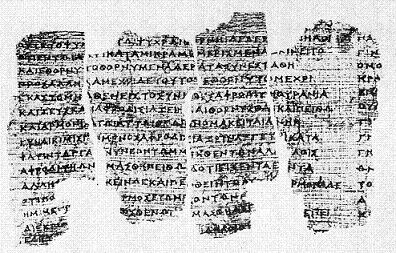
- Fragments of the Derveni papyrus
- Type: Papyrus roll
- Date: c. 340 BC, from a late 5th century BC original
- Place of origin: Macedonia
- Language: Ancient Greek
- Size: 266 fragments
- Format: 26 columns
- Condition: Fragmentary, charred from funeral pyre
- Contents: Commentary on a hexameter poem ascribed to Orpheus
- Discovered: 1962

The Derveni papyrus is an Ancient Greek papyrus roll that was discovered in 1962 at the archaeological site of Derveni, near Thessaloniki, in Greece. A philosophical treatise, the text is an allegorical commentary on an Orphic poem, a theogony concerning the birth of the gods, produced in the circle of the philosopher Anaxagoras. The roll dates to around 340 BC, during the reign of Philip II of Macedon, making it Europe's oldest surviving manuscript. The poem itself was originally composed near the end of the 5th century BC, and "in the fields of Greek religion, the sophistic movement, early philosophy, and the origins of literary criticism it is unquestionably the most important textual discovery of the 20th century." While interim editions and translations were published over the subsequent years, the manuscript in its entirety was first published in 2006.

== Discovery ==
Discovery site

The roll was found on 15 January 1962 at a site in Derveni, Macedonia, northern Greece, on the road from Thessaloniki to Kavala. The site is a nobleman's grave in a necropolis that was part of a rich cemetery belonging to the ancient city of Lete. It is the oldest surviving manuscript in the Western tradition, the only known ancient papyrus found in Greece proper, and possibly the oldest surviving papyrus written in Greek regardless of provenance, although according to Martin Litchfield West a papyrus from Daphni is around half a century older. The archaeologists Petros Themelis and Maria Siganidou recovered the top parts of the charred papyrus scroll and fragments from ashes atop the slabs of the tomb; the bottom parts had burned away in the funeral pyre. The scroll was carefully unrolled and the fragments joined together, thus forming 26 columns of text. It survived in the humid Greek soil, which is unfavorable to the conservation of papyri, because it was carbonized (hence dried) in the nobleman's funeral pyre. However, this has made it extremely difficult to read, since the ink is black and the background is black too; in addition, it survives in the form of 266 fragments, which are conserved under glass in descending order of size, and has had to be painstakingly reconstructed. Many smaller fragments are still not placed. The papyrus is kept in the Archaeological Museum of Thessaloniki.

== Content ==
In total, twenty six columns of text survive today. The main part of the text is a commentary on a hexameter poem ascribed to Orpheus, which was used in the mystery cult of Dionysus by the "Orphic initiators". Fragments of the poem are quoted, followed by interpretations by the main author of the text, who tries to show that the poem does not mean what it literally says. The poem begins with the words "Close the doors, you uninitiated", a famous admonition to secrecy, also quoted by Plato. The interpreter claims that this shows that Orpheus wrote his poem as an allegory. The theogony described in the poem has Nyx (Night) give birth to Uranus (Sky), who becomes the first king. Cronus follows and takes the kingship from Uranus, but he is likewise succeeded by Zeus, whose power over the whole universe is celebrated. Zeus gains his power by hearing oracles from the sanctuary of Nyx, who tells him "all the oracles which afterwards he was to put into effect." At the end of the text, Zeus rapes his mother Rhea, which, in the Orphic theogony, will lead to the birth of Demeter. Zeus would then have raped Demeter, who would have given birth to Persephone, who marries Dionysus. However, this part of the story must have continued in a second roll which is now lost.

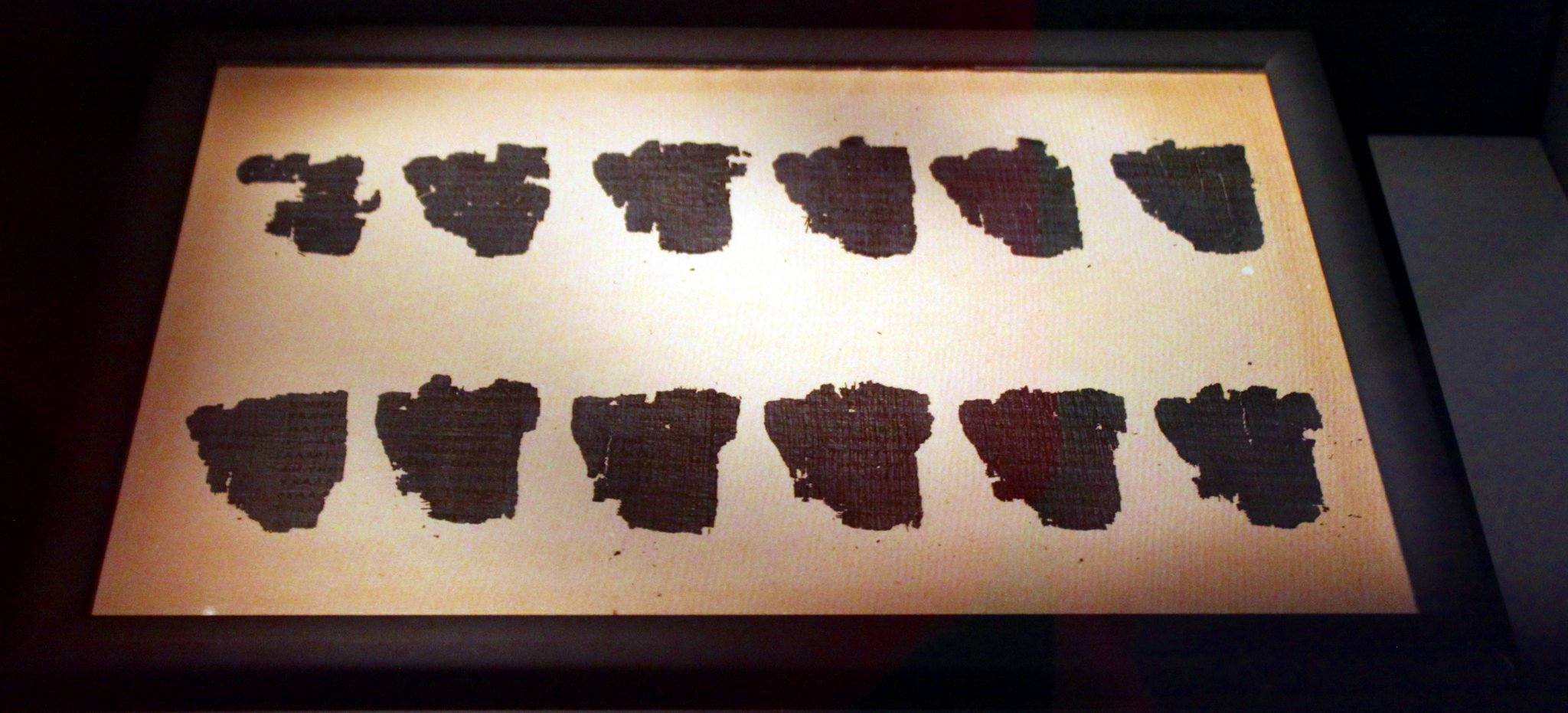
The Derveni papyrus, Archaeological Museum of Thessaloniki

The interpreter of the poem argues that Orpheus did not intend any of these stories in a literal sense, but they are allegorical in nature.

This poem is strange and riddling to people, though [Orpheus] did not intend to tell contentious riddles but rather great things in riddles. In fact he is speaking mystically, and from the very first word all the way to the last. As he also makes clear in the well recognized verse: for, having ordered them to "put doors to their ears," he says that he is not legislating for the many [but addressing himself to those] who are pure in hearing ... and in the following verse ...

The first surviving columns of the text are less well preserved, but talk about occult ritual practices, including sacrifices to the Erinyes (Furies), how to remove daimones that become a problem, and the beliefs of the magi. They include a quotation of the philosopher Heraclitus. Their reconstruction is extremely controversial, since even the order of fragments is disputed. Two different reconstructions have recently been offered, that by Valeria Piano and that by Richard Janko, who notes elsewhere that he has found that these columns also include a quotation of the philosopher Parmenides.

== Language ==
The text of the papyrus contains a mix of ancient Greek dialects. It is written mainly in a mixture of Attic and Ionic Greek; however, it also contains a few Doric forms. In some instances, the same word appears in different dialectal forms, such as cμικρό- and μικρό ((s)mikro; 'small,' an example of s-mobile); ὄντα and ἐόντα ((e)onta; 'real', masc. acc. sing.); νιν and μιν (nin/min; 'him/her/it', masc. acc. sing.).

== Recent reading ==
The full surviving text was not officially published for 44 years after its discovery, although three partial editions were issued. A team of experts was assembled in 2005 led by A. L. Pierris of the Institute for Philosophical studies and Dirk Obbink, director of the Oxyrhynchus Papyri project at the University of Oxford, with the help of modern multispectral imaging techniques by Roger MacFarlane and Gene Ware of Brigham Young University, to attempt a better approach to the edition of a difficult text. However, results of this initiative were not published or made available to other scholars. The papyrus was finally published by a team of researchers from Thessaloniki (Tsantsanoglou et al., below), and they provided a complete text of the papyrus based on an analysis of the fragments, with photographs and translation. Subsequent progress was made in reading the papyrus by Valeria Piano and Richard Janko, who developed a new method for taking digital microphotographs of the papyrus, a technique that permitted some of the most difficult passages to be read for the first time. Examples of these images are now in the public domain. A version of Janko's new text is available in an edition by Mirjam Kotwick, while an English edition is in preparation.

== Significance ==
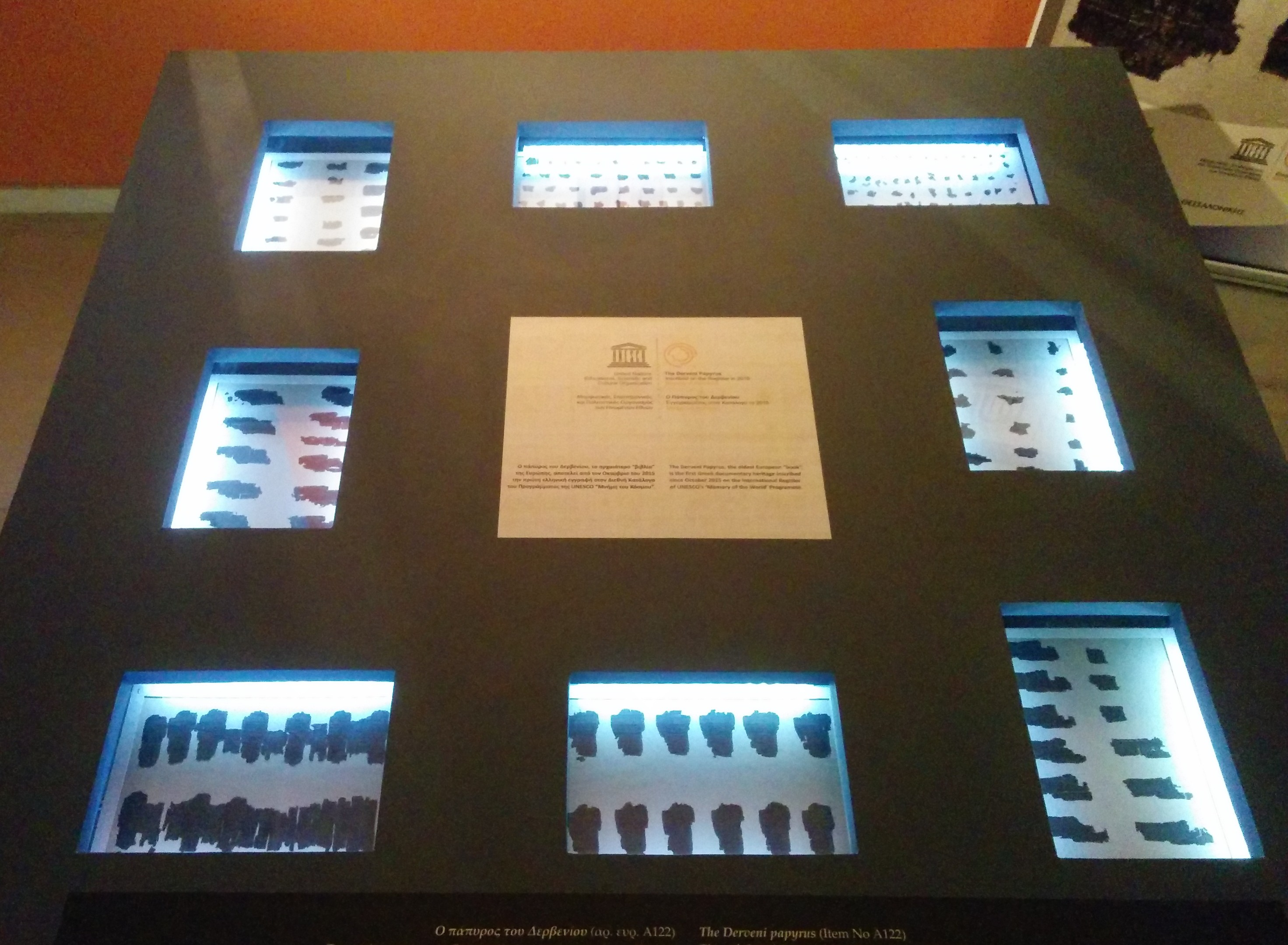
The Derveni papyrus fragments in the Archaeological Museum of Thessaloniki, with the UNESCO dedication in the middle of the panel

In 2015 the Derveni papyrus was added by UNESCO to the Memory of the World International Register where it is described as the oldest known European book. It was the first item from Greece to achieve this recognition. According to UNESCO:

The Derveni Papyrus is of immense importance not only for the study of Greek religion and philosophy, which is the basis for the western philosophical thought, but also because it serves as a proof of the early dating of the Orphic poems offering a distinctive version of Presocratic philosophers. The text of the Papyrus, which is the first book of western tradition, has a global significance, since it reflects universal human values: the need to explain the world, the desire to belong to a human society with known rules and the agony to confront the end of life.
