= Derveni Krater =

Volute krater discovered in Greece

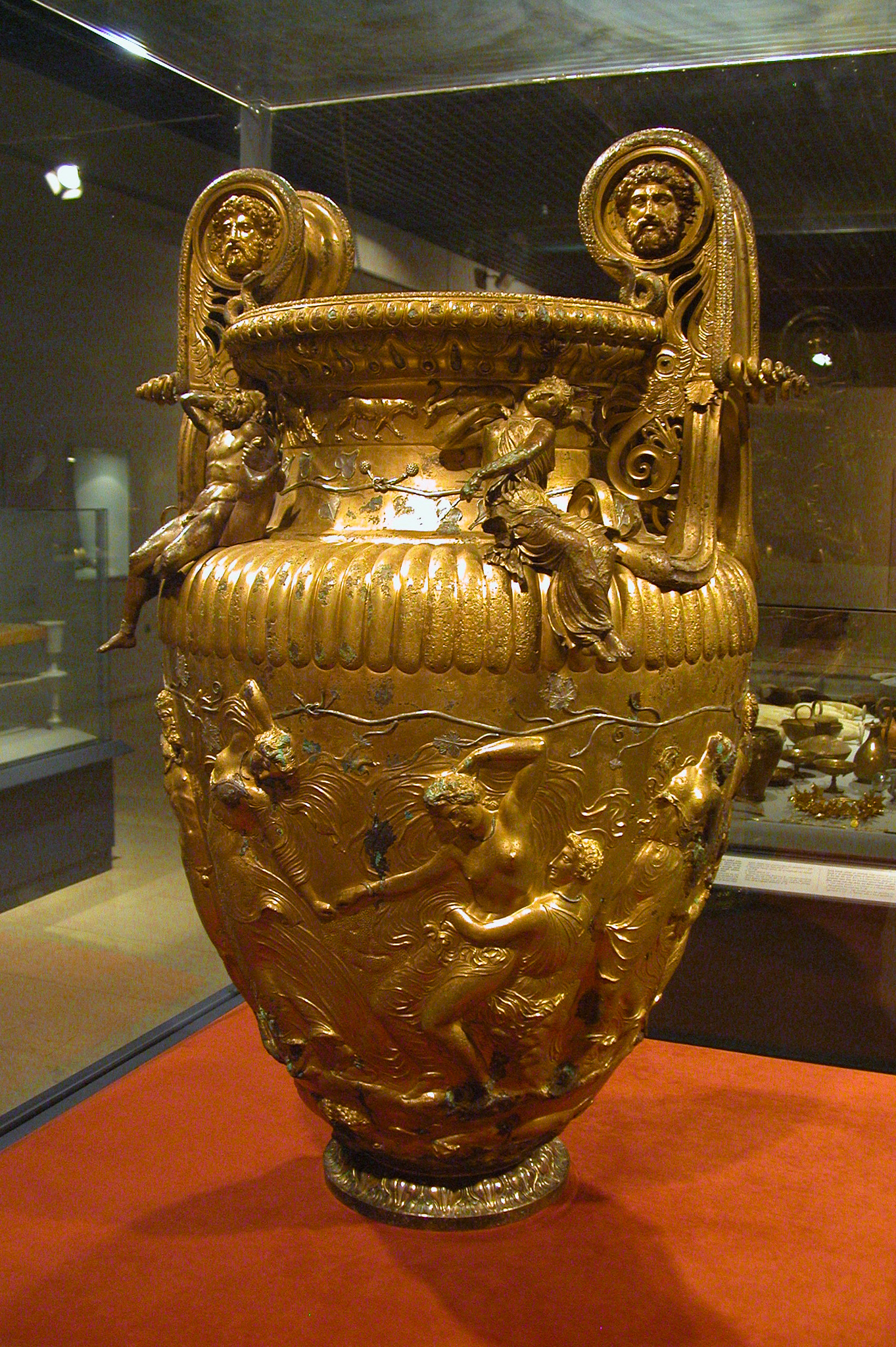
- Inv. B1, Archaeological Museum of Thessaloniki. Detail shown below.

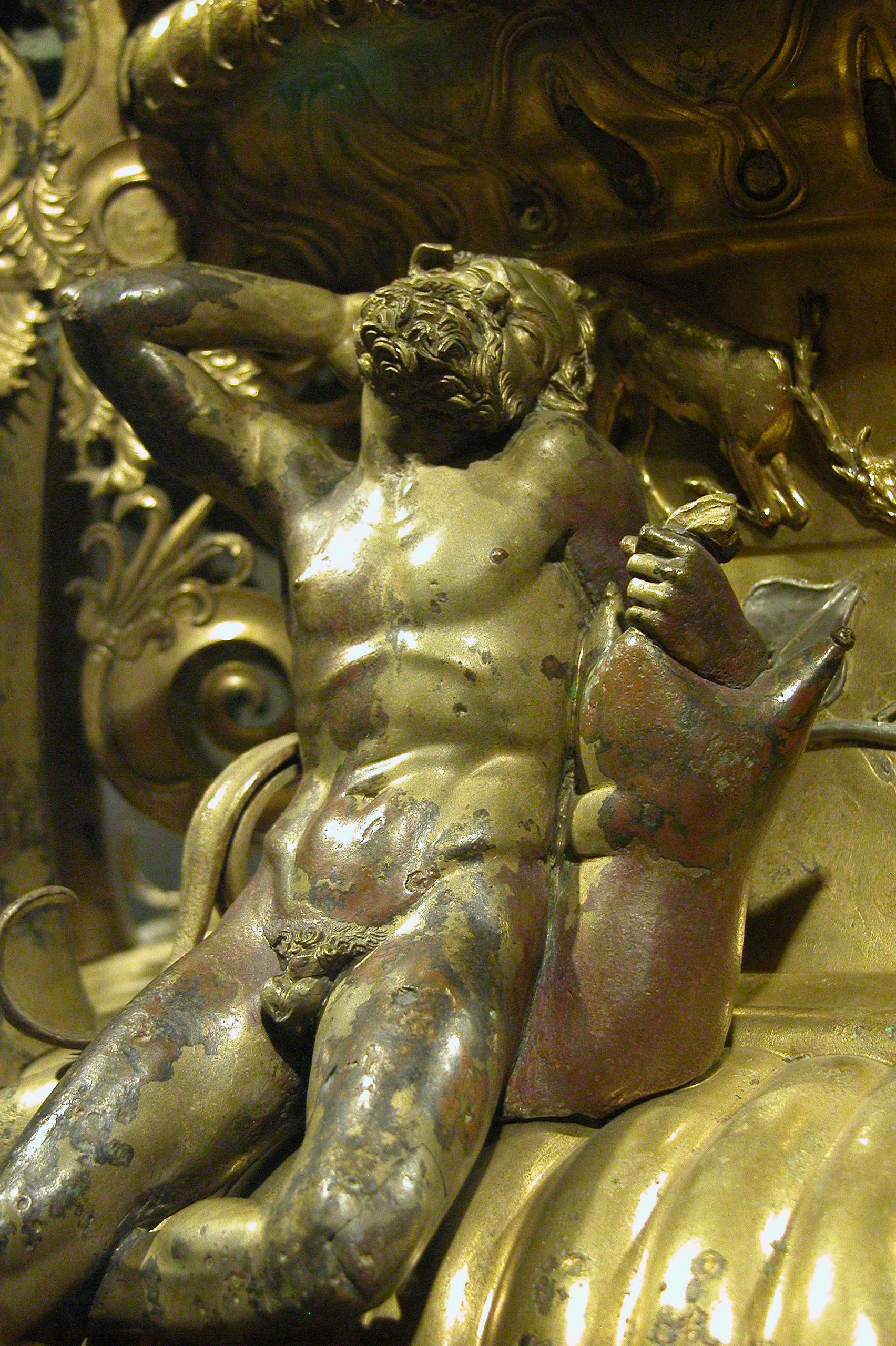
- Material: Bronze with 15% tin
- Height: 90.5 centimetres (35.6 in)
- Weight: 40 kilograms (88 lb)
- Writing: Funerary inscription in the Thessalian dialect of ancient Greek
- Created: 4th century BC
- Discovered: 1962; Derveni; 40°43′13″N 22°58′17.2″E

The Derveni Krater is a volute krater, the most elaborate of its type, discovered in 1962 in a tomb at Derveni, not far from Thessaloniki, and displayed at the Archaeological Museum of Thessaloniki. Weighing 40 kg, it is made of a bronze with a high tin content of about 15%, which endows it with a superb golden sheen without use of any gold at all. It is dated to the 4th century BC, and was probably made in Athens. Large metalwork vessels are extremely rare survivals in Ancient Greek art, and the Derveni Krater is the outstanding survival from Hellenistic art, as the Vix Krater is from the Archaic period.

== Discovery ==
The krater was discovered buried, as a funerary urn for a Thessalian aristocrat whose name is engraved on the vase: Astiouneios, son of Anaxagoras, from Larissa. Kraters (mixing bowls) were vessels used for mixing undiluted wine with water and probably various spices as well, the drink then being ladled out to fellow banqueters at ritual or festive celebrations. When excavated, the Derveni Krater contained 1968.31 g of burnt bones that belonged to a man aged 35–50 and to a younger woman.

== Technique and decoration ==
The vase is composed of two leaves of metal which were hammered then joined, although the handles and the volutes (scrolls) were cast and attached. The main alloy used gives it a golden colour, but at various points the decoration is worked with different metals as overlays or inlays of silver, copper, bronze and other base metals. Such highlights include the silver garlands of vine and ivy around the krater, the silver and copper stripes on the vipers at the handles, and the silver orbs of the eyes of the volute masks.

The top part of the krater is decorated with motifs both ornamental (gadroons, palm leaves, acanthus, garlands) and figurative: the top of the neck presents a frieze of animals and most of all, four statuettes (two maenads, Dionysus and a sleeping satyr) are casually seated on the shoulders of the vase, in a pose foreshadowing that of the Barberini Faun. On the belly, the frieze in low relief, 32.6 cm tall, is devoted to the divinities Ariadne and Dionysus, surrounded by revelling satyrs and maenads of the Bacchic thiasus, or ecstatic retinue. There is also a warrior wearing only one sandal, whose identity is disputed: Pentheus, Lycurgus of Thrace, or perhaps the "one-sandalled" Jason of Argonaut fame.

== Dating ==
The exact date and place of making are disputed. Barr-Sharrar thinks it was made around 370 BC in Athens. Based on the dialectal forms used in the inscription, some commentators think it was fabricated in Thessaly at the time of the revolt of the Aleuadae, around 350 BC. Others date it between 330 and 320 BC and credit it to bronzesmiths of the royal court of Alexander the Great.

== Inscription ==
The funerary inscription on the krater reads:

ΑΣΤΙΟΥΝΕΙΟΣ ΑΝΑΞΑΓΟΡΑΙΟΙ ΕΣ ΛΑΡΙΣΑΣ

The inscription is in the Thessalian, variant of the Aeolian dialect: Aστιούνειος Aναξαγοραίοι ἐς Λαρίσας (Astioúneios Anaxagoraīoi es Larísas), "Astiouneios, son of Anaxagoras, from Larissa." If transcribed in Attic, the inscription could read: Aστίων Aναξαγόρου ἐκ Λαρίσης (Astíōn Anaxagórou ek Larísēs).

== Notes ==
=== Bibliography ===
- E. Giouri, Ο κρατήρας του Δερβενίου, Athènes, Goebel, 1978 (Tr. "The krater of Derveni").
- Πέτρος Γ. Θεμελης, Γιάννης Π. Τσουράτσογλου, Οι Τάφοι του Δερβενίου, Ταμείο αρχαιολογικών πόρων, Athens, 1997. ISBN 960-214-103-4 (Tr. Petros G. Themelis and Giannis Tsouratsoglou, "The tombs of Derveni". In Greek with English summaries).
- Bernard Holtzmann and Alain Pasquier, Histoire de l'art antique : l'art grec, Documentation française, coll. "Manuels de l' École du Louvre", Paris, 1998 2-11-003866-7, p. 216-217.
- G. Mihaïlov, "Observations sur le cratère de Dervéni", REA 93 (1991), p. 39-54.
- B. Barr-Sharrar, The Derveni Krater: Masterpiece of Classical Greek Metalwork, Princeton, American School of Classical Studies at Athens, 2008. ISBN 978-0-87661-962-9.
- J.H. Musgrave, "The cremated remains from Tombs II and III at Nea Mihaniona and Tomb Beta at Derveni", The Annual of the British School at Athens, Vol. 85 (1990), pp. 301–325.
- Sideris, A., "Les tombes de Derveni. Quelques remarques sur la toreutique", Revue Archéologique 2000, pp. 3–36.

== Attribution ==
- This page draws heavily on fr:Cratère de Derveni article in the French-language Wikipedia, which was accessed in the version of Nov. 12, 2006.
