= Lete (Mygdonia) =

Ancient city in Mygdonia, Macedon

Coordinates: 40°44′42″N 22°58′41″E

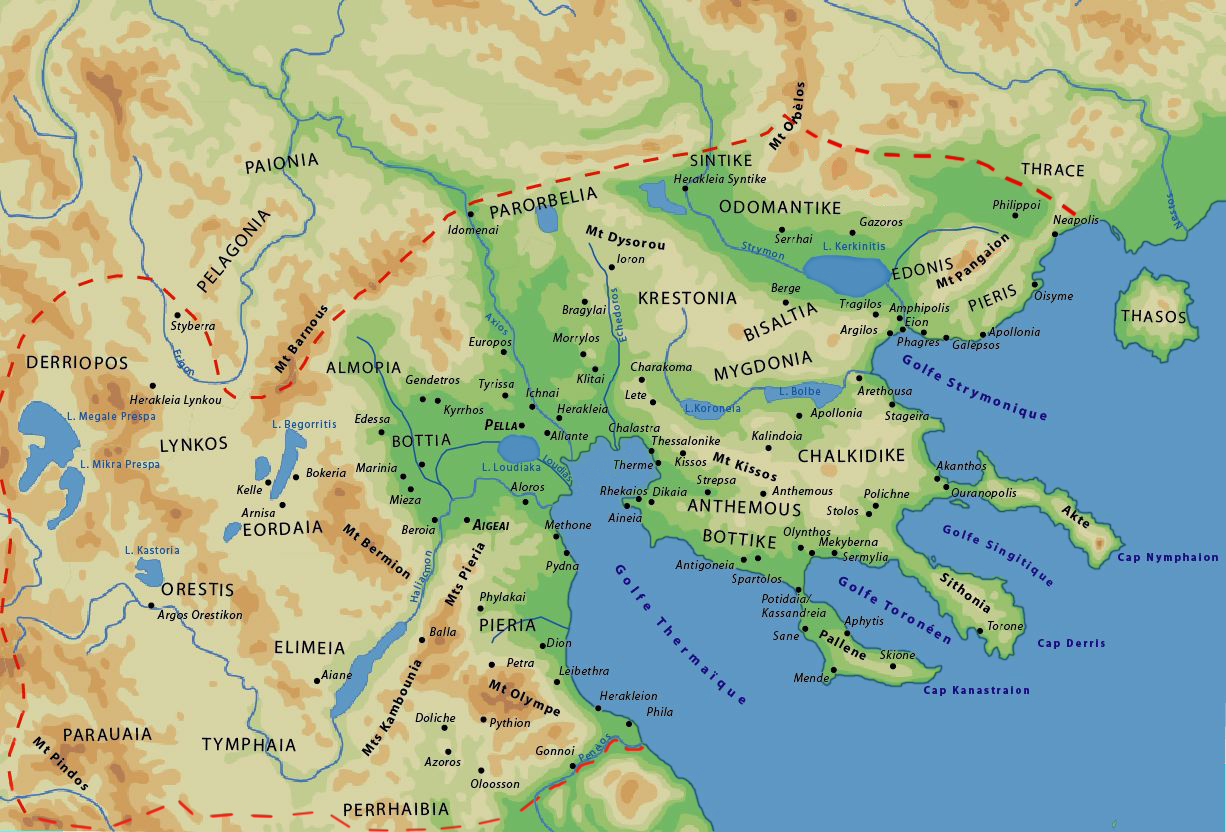
Macedonia and the Chalcidice

Lete (Ancient Greek: Λήτη or Λητή) was an ancient city in Mygdonia, Macedon and Roman Catholic titular see in the Roman province of Macedonia.

== History ==
Lete is known by its coins and inscriptions, mentioned in Ptolemy (III, xiii), the Pliny the Younger (IV, x, 17), Harpocration, Stephanus Byzantius and Suidas in Antiquity and in the Middle Ages in Nicephorus Bryennius (IV, xix). The spelling "Lite" is incorrect and comes from iotacism. According to Theagenes's Macedonica the town was named after the Greek goddess Leto, who was worshipped in a sanctuary near Lete.

Marsyas of Philippi mentions it many times in book 6 of Makedonika (Ancient Greek: Μακεδονικά).

In its necropolis were found the Derveni papyrus and the Derveni krater.

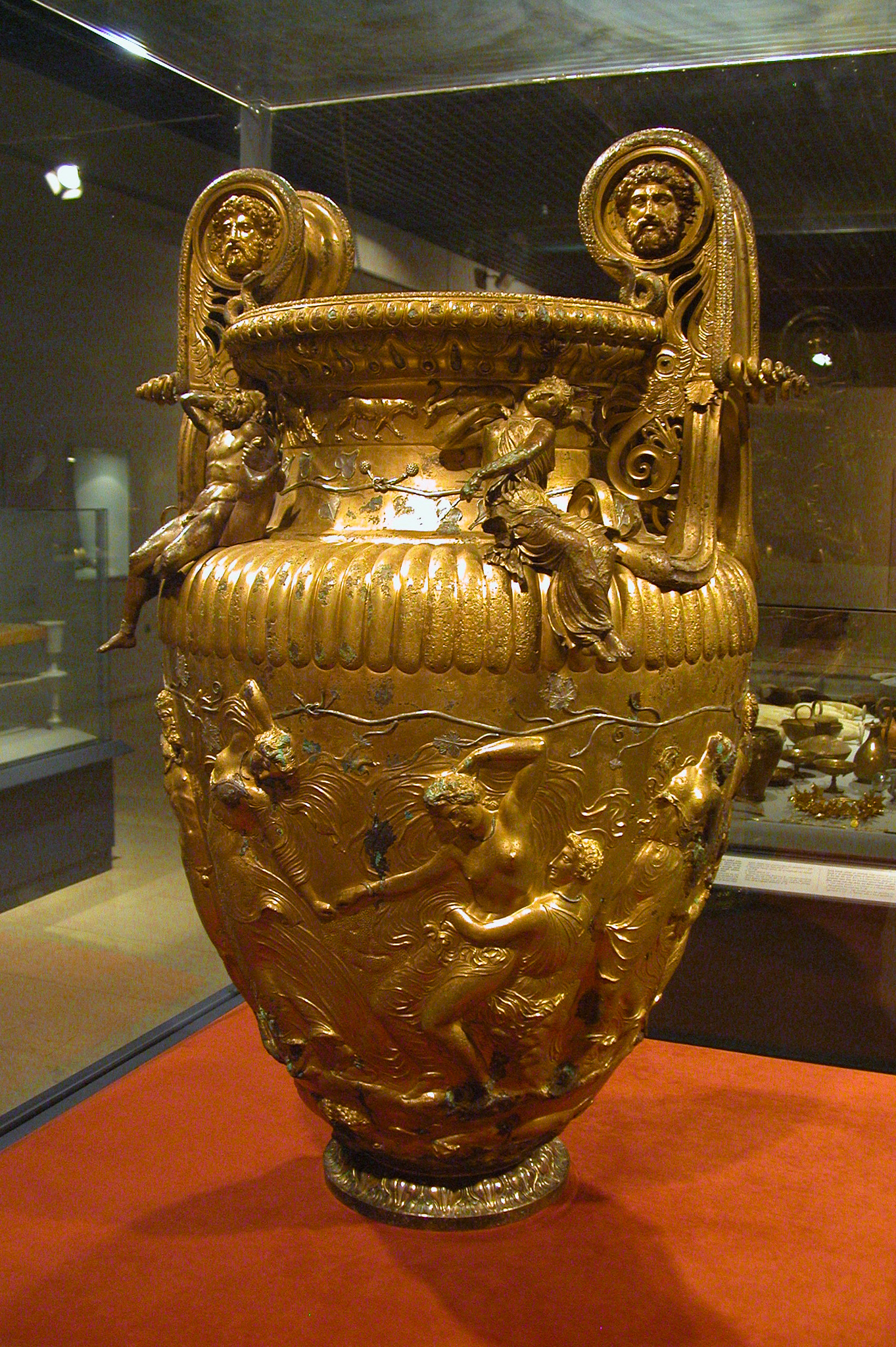
The Derveni krater.

Lete appears in some Notitiæ episcopatuum of a late period as suffragan of the Archbishopric of Thessalonica, later united to the See of Rentina. Lete and Rentina even had Greek (Orthodox) bishops until the eighteenth century.

Lete became the small village of Aivati/Ajvatovo situated a little north of Thessaloniki. Bulgarian revolutionary Andon Dimitrov was born there in 1867.

The site of Lete is the near the modern Liti.

== Sources ==
- Herbermann, Charles, ed. (1913). "Lete". Catholic Encyclopedia. New York: Robert Appleton Company.
