= Derveni =

Derveni may refer to:

== Albania ==
- Derven, Albania, a village in the municipality of Krujë

== Greece ==
- Derveni, Achaea, part of the municipal unit of Diakopto, Achaea
- Derveni, Arcadia, part of the municipality of Megalopoli, Arcadia
- Derveni, Corinthia, a town in the municipal unit Evrostina, Corinthia
- Derveni, Thessaloniki, a location north-east of Thessaloniki
- Derveni (mountain), a mountain in the southern part of the Evros
- Chani Derveni, a place located near Megara, Attica

== Other ==
- Derveni (Metsovo)
- Derveni Krater, found at Derveni, Thessaloniki, near ancient Lete, Macedon
- Derveni papyrus, found at Derveni, Thessaloniki, near ancient Lete, Macedon

== See also ==
- Derven (disambiguation)
