= Derven =

Derven may refer to:

- Derven, Albania, a village in the municipality of Krujë, Albania
- Derven, the former name for Svrljig, a town in Serbia

== See also ==
- Derveni (disambiguation)
