= Averoff Gallery =

Art museum in Metsovo, Greece

Coordinates: 39.76905°N 21.18329°E

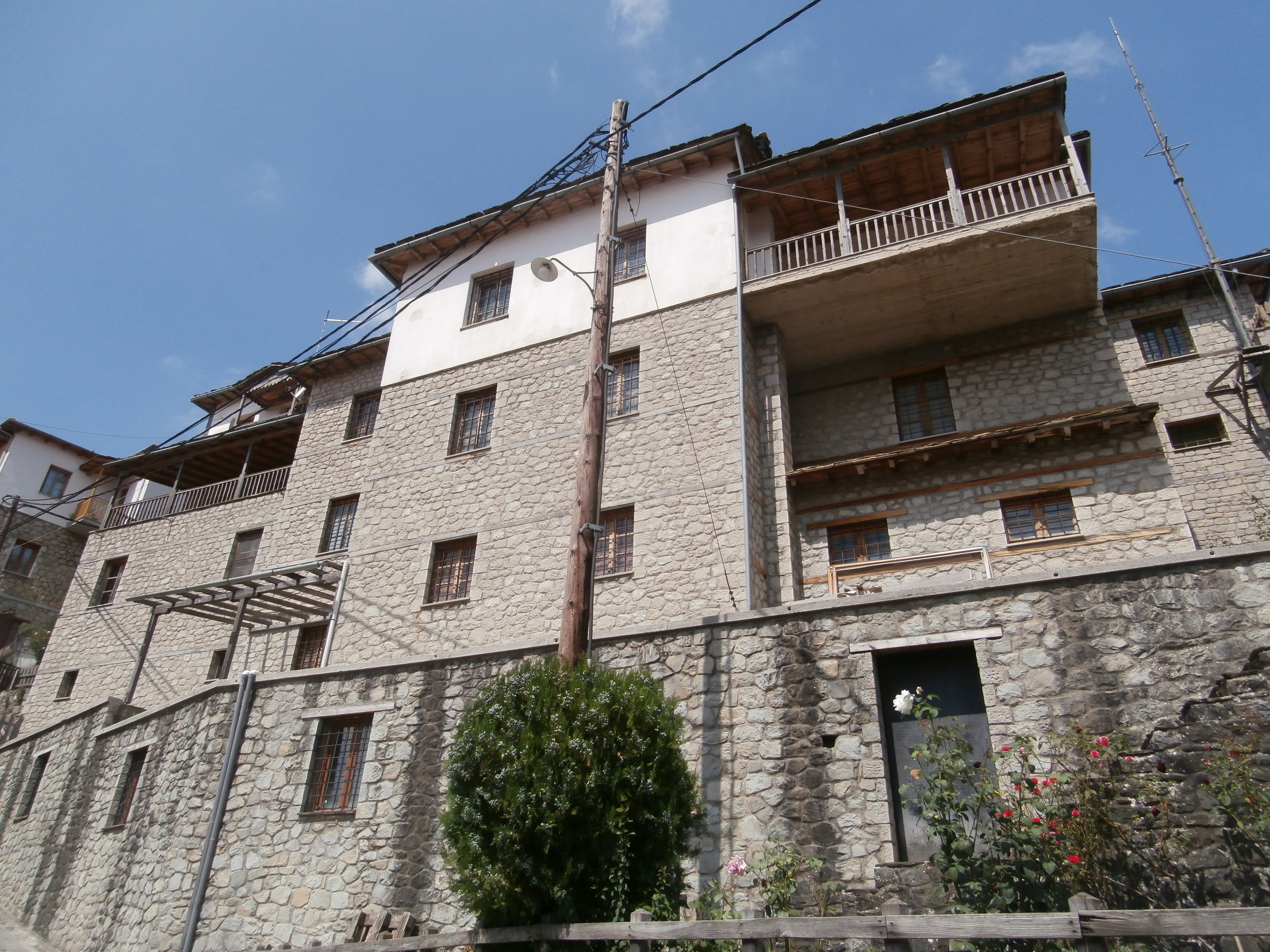
- The Averoff Gallery as seen from below (2014).
- Established: 1988
- Location: Metsovo, Ioannina, Greece
- Type: Art museum
- Website: www.averoffmuseum.gr

The Averoff Gallery, also known as the Averof Art Gallery of Metsovo, is an art museum in Metsovo, Greece. It was built in 1985 and inaugurated in 1988. In 1994 the building was extended to include a new wing and its facilities were updated.

Its initial collection consisted of 200 paintings and sculptures of Greek artists of the 19th and 20th century, which are still part of its permanent exhibition. After the museum's expansion, the collection was significantly augmented.
