= Zygos mountain range =

Mountain range by the Metsovo area

Coordinates: 39°46′59″N 21°13′28″E

== Central Balkans ==
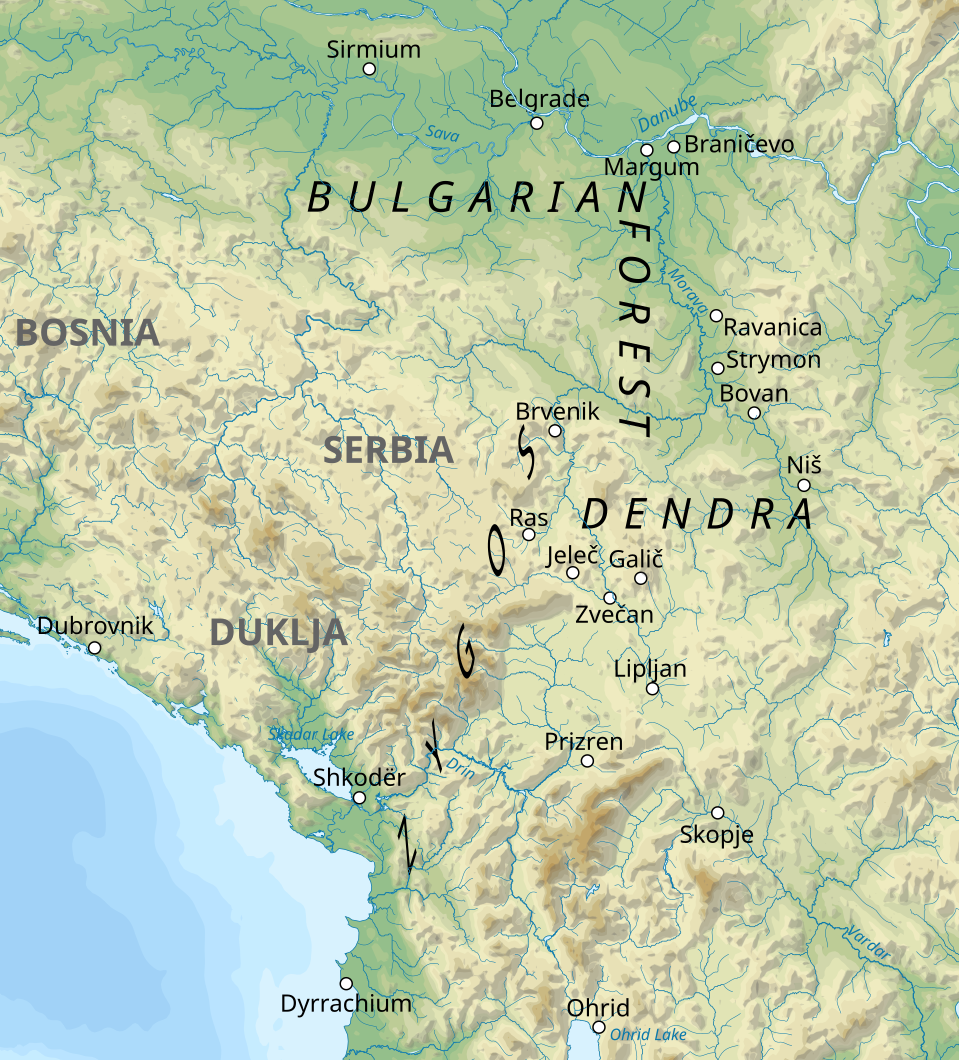
Byzantium's frontier in the 10-12th century with the location of the Zygos (per Stephenson 2004, 2008).

Zygos was a mountainous region to the West of and between Niš and Skopje. It was the frontier area of the Byzantine Empire which separated it from the Grand Principality of Serbia which was beyond it. East of it were several Byzantine watchtowers. North of it was mesaichmion, a disputed land, also identified as a "Bulgarian forest", while East of it also was Dendra area near Niš.

== Greece ==
In many written accounts, from medieval times until now, a large section of the mountain range that crosses the east region of the Metsovo area is referred to as Zygos. This name derives from the name Zygos or ʤugu in the local Vlach dialect, which the people of Metsovo used to refer to a certain saddle (notch) of the same mountain ridge that served as a mountain pass. For centuries it was the highest point of the main travel route between Epirus and Thessaly. The timeless importance of this section of the ridge to land transportation in the past, the difficulties faced by travelers in the wintertime as well its pristine beauty made it the object of multiple and extensive references from antiquity until recent years. The wanderer Leake considers Zygos as the most noteworthy mountain in Greece and the location of the springs of its largest rivers. The painter Edward Lear says that Zygos is the "parent" of the greatest rivers in Greece, it regulates travel between Epirus and Thessaly and it is equally famous for its interconnections, its geographical and political position, and its picturesque scenery.
