= Mukataa of Metsovo =

Tax district in Ottoman Greece

The mukataa (mukata’a) was a tax district in Ottoman Greece, according to the systems applied widely during the centuries of decline of the Ottoman's fiscal mechanism. The Chora Metsovo was a mukataa, meaning a tax district, the proceeds of which were leased out to malikâne, or lifelong tenants of tax districts.

In the Ottoman Empire, the term mukataa referred to districts or regions, parts of state goods, or other sources of revenue which, in order to facilitate its operation, the state would concede to iltizâm, i.e. to private individuals for a set period of time (tahvi). These districts were granted for tenure through an auction (müzayede) to the person who offered to pay the highest bid to the state treasury.

Seeing that temporary tenants or the frequent change of tenants created tax collection problems and increased foul play against taxpayers, the Ottoman state established the malikâne system, i.e. the system of lifelong tenants of certain tax districts. This is precisely where the political structure of the Chora Metsovou converges with the tax system of the Ottoman Empire. Its Voivodes, meaning the Ottoman officials who were assigned the supervision of a mukataa, are mentioned in local sources also as "malikiane saibides or zaebides", which attests to the fact that their tenure on Chora Metsovou was lifelong and its purpose was to observe and apply the orders of the Sultan’s firmans regarding Metsovo.

== Sources ==
- Η. Gerbe, MUKĀTA‘A, The Encyclopaedia of Islam, (VII: 508a).
- Β. Cvetkova, "I ekseliksi tou tourkikou feoudalikou kathestotos apo ta teli tou IST’ os ta mesa tou IH’ aiona" [The evolution of the Turkish feudal regime from the late 16th to the mid-18th c.], in I oikonomiki domi ton Valkanikon choron sta chronia tis othomanikis kyriarchias ie’-ih’ c. [The economic structure of the Balkan countries in the years of the Ottoman rule, 15th-19th c.], publ. Melissa, Athens 1979, pp. 93 –95, 103
- H.Inalcik, The Emergence of big farms, çiftliks: state, landlords and tenants, Collection Turcica III, éd. Peeters, Leuvain 1983, pp. 111–112
- G. Plataris, Kodikas Choras Metsovou ton eton 1708-1907 [Chora Metsovou Log of the years 1708-1907], Athens 1982,, pp. 19–20
- L. Darling, Revenue-raising and legitimacy. Tax collection and finance administration in the Ottoman Empire 1560-1660, Lainten-N.York-Cologne 1996, pp. 119–16
