= Kyriakos Flokas =

According to oral historical tradition of Metsovo, Κyriakos or Kyrgos Flokas contributed greatly to the granting of a privileged status by the Ottomans to the Metsovo region in 1659.

The relevant legend says that a Grand Vizier ensured the granting of privileges to Metsovo in gratitude to the Metsovite chief shepherd after Flokas offered him assistance and a place to hide when the Vizier had fallen into the disfavor of the Sultan and was at risk of being executed. More specifically, the high-ranking Ottoman official, dressed in shepherd's clothes, had been following Flokas’ herds for three years in the winter grasslands of Thessaly and the summer pastures of Metsovo. It was later revealed that the Grand Vizier had been the victim of slander and therefore the Sultan granted him amnesty, sought him out and reinstated him. Later on, the Vizier invited Kyriakos Flokas to visit him and gave him many presents and a Sultan's firman (mandate) granting Metsovo and the neighboring villages special privileges.

Although the existence of Kyriakos Flokas has not been documented historically, the fact is that the Flokas family appears in the sources about Metsovo as one of the most powerful families of the upper social class. In the 18th century, we see members of the family holding leadership positions, funding public projects and donating land to the churches and monasteries of the area. It is also noteworthy that the centermost part of Metsovo, where the central square is located today, used to be called “machalas of Flokas” (Flokas’ neighborhood).

== See also ==
- Flocafé

== Sources ==
- V. Skafidas, “Ta pronomia tou Metsovou” [The privileges of Metsovo], Epirotiki Estia 1 (1952), pp. 657–660.
- V. Diamandi, «Mețovițeanul Floca și privilegiile obținute de el», Convorbiri literare (1910), pp. 480–483.
- G. Plataris-Tzimas, Kodikas Diathikon, Meizones kai elassones euergetes tou Metsovou [Log of Wills, Major and Minor Benefactors of Metsovo], Vol. B’, publ. of the Prefecture of Ioannina and the City of Metsovo, Metsovo/Athens 2004, pp. 262–263.
- A. Vakalopoulos, Istoria tou Neou Ellinismou [History of Modern Hellenism], Vol. B’, Thessaloniki 1961, p. 340.
- G. Plataris, Kodikas Choras Metsovou ton eton 1708-1907 [Chora Metsovou Log of the years 1708-1907], Athens 1982, pp. 7, 11, 34, 40, 64, 66, 68, 72-73, 78, 81, 84, 92- 93, 103, 119, 155.
