= Metsovo =

Town in Epirus, Greece

Metsovo Μέτσοβο Aminciu
- Municipality
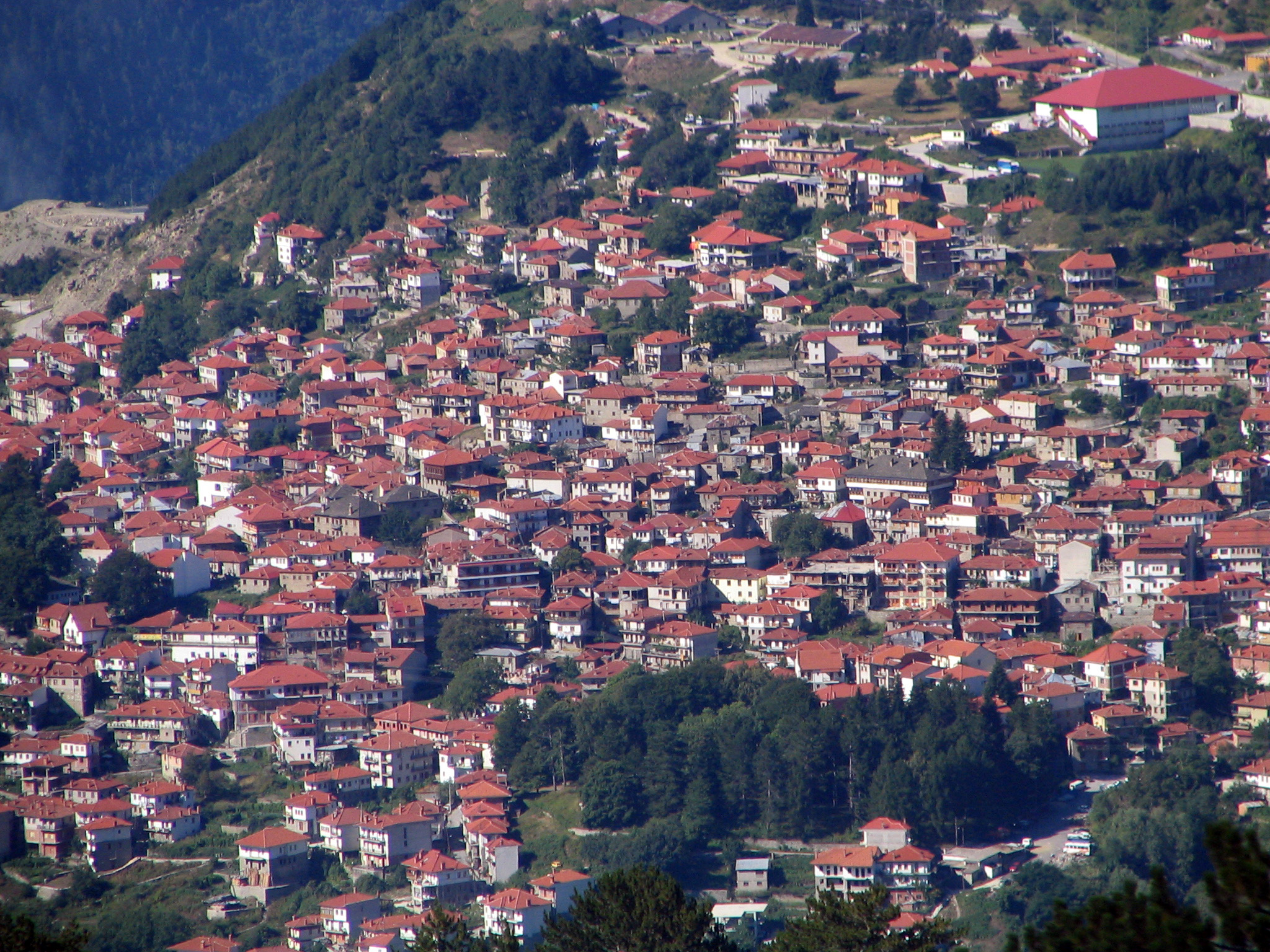
- Panorama of Metsovo.

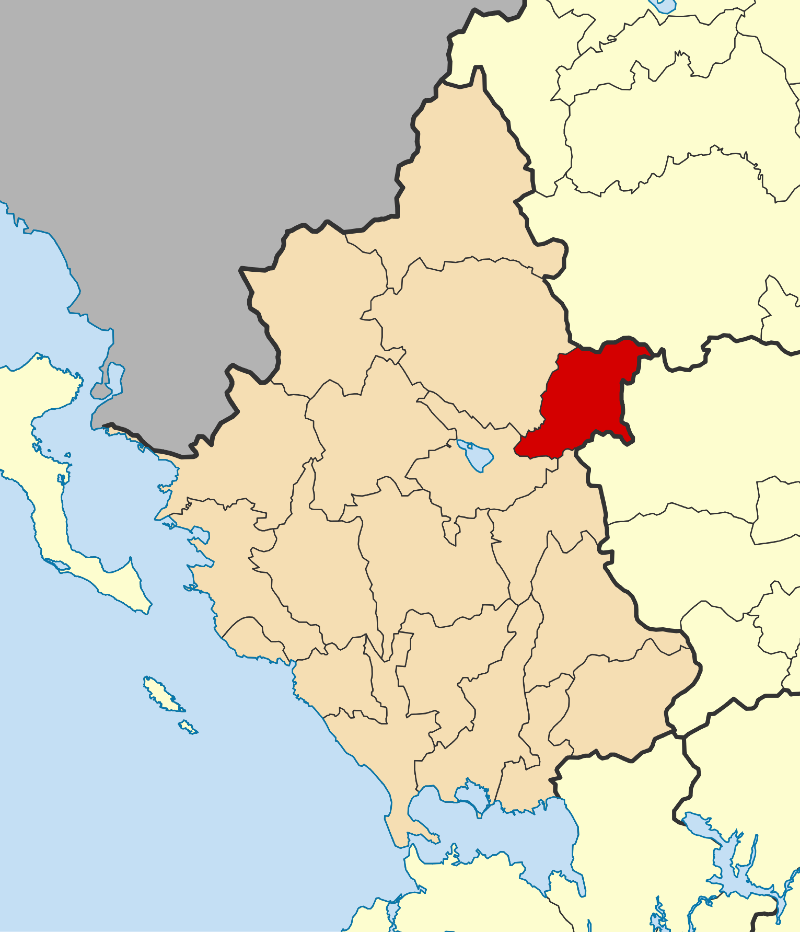

- Location within Greece
- Coordinates: 39°46′13″N 21°11′02″E
- Country: Greece
- Administrative region: Epirus
- Regional unit: Ioannina

Government
  - Mayor: Maria-Christina Averof (since 2023)

Area
  - Municipality: 363.7 km^{2} (140.4 sq mi)
  - Municipal unit: 177.7 km^{2} (68.6 sq mi)
  - Community: 101.9 km^{2} (39.3 sq mi)
- Elevation: 1,160 m (3,810 ft)

Population (2021)
  - Municipality: 5,432
  - Density: 14.94/km^{2} (38.68/sq mi)
  - Municipal unit: 3,254
  - Municipal unit density: 18.31/km^{2} (47.43/sq mi)
  - Community: 2,337
  - Community density: 22.93/km^{2} (59.40/sq mi)
- Time zone: UTC+2 (EET)
  - Summer (DST): UTC+3 (EEST)
- Postal code: 442 00
- Area code: 26560
- Vehicle registration: ΙΝ
- Website: metsovo.gr

Metsovo (Greek: Μέτσοβο; Aromanian: Aminciu) is a town in Epirus, in the mountains of Pindus in northern Greece, between Ioannina to the west and Meteora to the east.

The largest centre of Aromanian (Vlach) life in Greece, Metsovo is a large regional hub for several small villages and settlements in the Pindus region, and it features many shops, schools, offices, services, museums, and galleries. The economy of Metsovo is dominated by agriculture and tourism, the latter flourishing in winter.

Metsovo is served by Greek National Road 6 (Ioannina – Trikala) and by the A2 motorway.

== Etymology ==
From medieval times till well into the 19th century, Metsovo was known, in various sources, as Metzovo. From the end of the 18th century on, the literary form of Messovon makes its appearance. The town is known as Aminciu in Aromanian (Vlach), and as Miçova in Ottoman Turkish.

=== Ottoman census records ===
In the Ottoman census records we see the word Mcwh (مجوه), which is usually pronounced "Miçova". In Aromanian, Metsovo is called Aminʤu, a word combining the preposition "a" (meaning "to, into") and the word "Minʤu".

=== Various names ===
From "Minʤu" derive terms signifying ethnic origin Miʤanu and Miʤanə—meaning, respectively, "man from Metsovo", "woman from Metsovo"—as well as the adjectives miʤənescu and miʤəneascə—meaning "Metsovite", "of Metsovo"—which are used today by the residents of Metsovo. The Aromanian part of the population, that part which does not use the term Aminʤu, uses the name "Meʤova". Some firman refer to Metsovo as Derveni.

=== Modern form ===
The derivation of the name Metsovo—from the words Mitsous and Mesovounon or from the unattested Slav word *Mẹčovo, meaning bear-place—which has been proposed by academics and historians, is not confirmed by linguistic research. Alternatively, there appears to be an etymological relation between the Aromanian Minʤu and the Greek Metsovo, the latter being a combination of the stem Mets and the Slavic-ending ovo.

== History ==
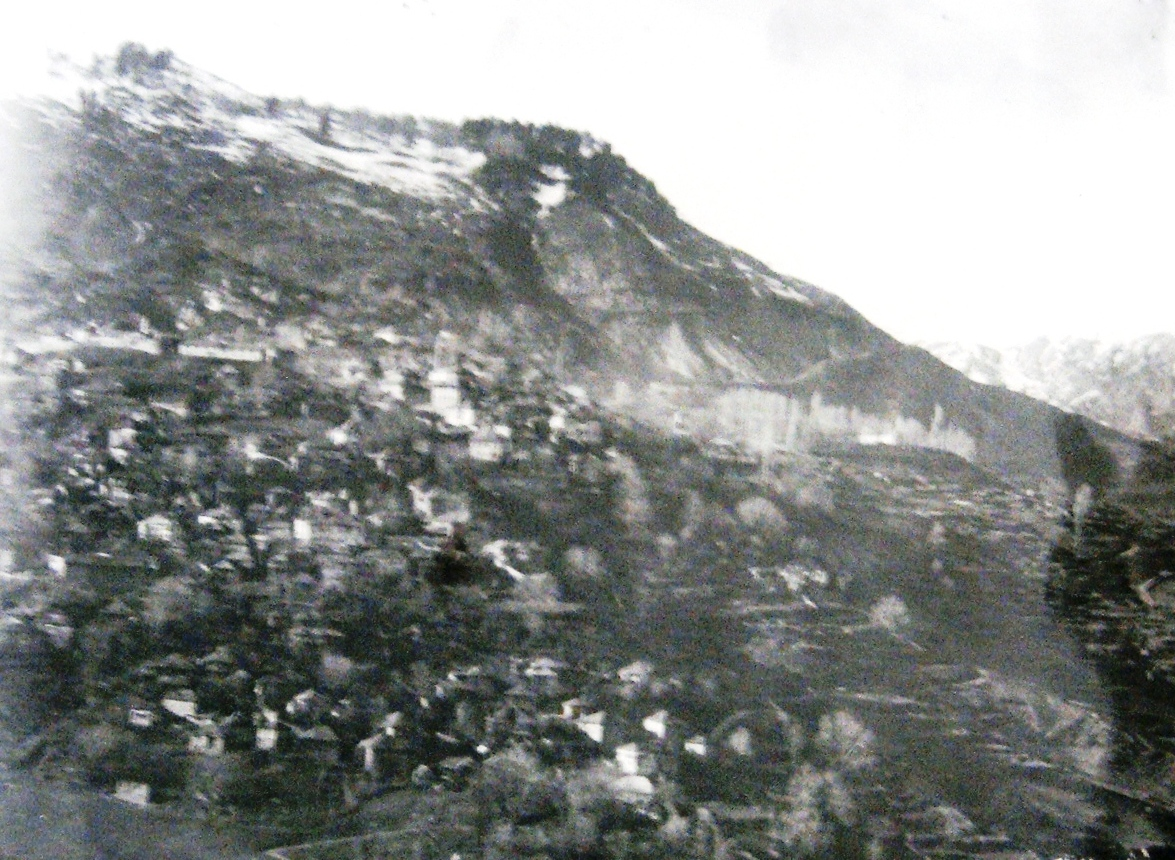
Panorama of Metsovo, 1899. Photo by the Manaki brothers (damaged glass plate)

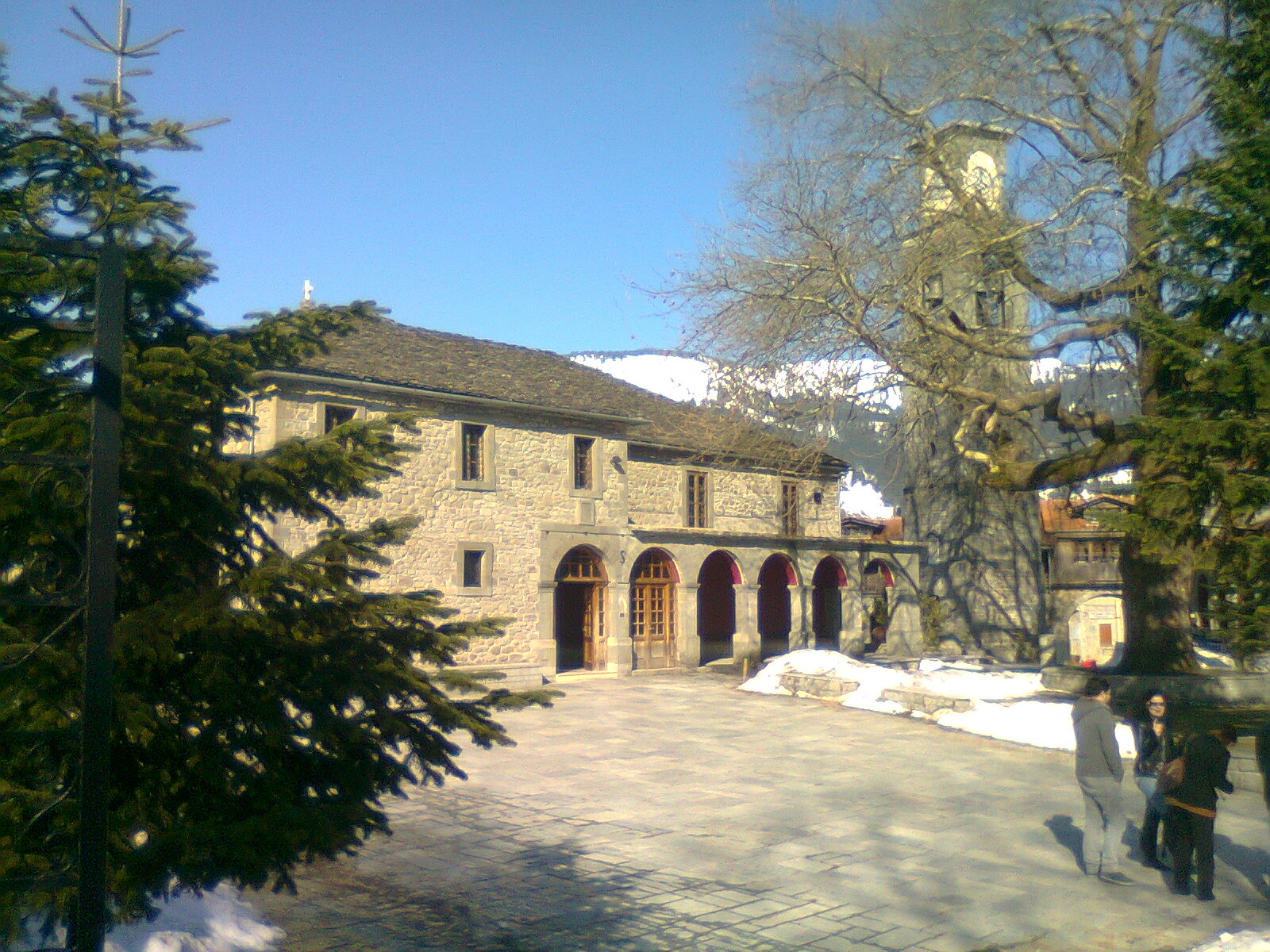
The church of Agia Paraskevi

In the 15th century Metsovo came under Ottoman rule and became part of the Sanjak of Ioannina. Throughout the late period of Ottoman rule (18th century-1913) the Greek and Aromanian population of the region (Northern Pindus) suffered from Albanian raiders. On one occasion, during the local Greek revolt of 1854, the town was plundered by both Ottoman troops and the men of Theodoros Grivas, a former general in the Greek military, during their struggle for control of the town.

During the First Balkan War, Metsovo was burnt by raiding bands. In the last 10 days of October 1912, military volunteers from Crete, together with about 340 soldiers of the tactical Greek army under the command of Lieutenant Colonel Mitsas, advanced through Thessaly to the then Greek-Turkish border along the mountains east of Metsovo. On October 31, 1912, the Greek troops assisted by rebel groups from Epirus and volunteers from Metsovo, having crossed the Katara-Zygos mountain ridge overnight, attacked the Turkish garrison of Metsovo, which then comprised 205 soldiers and two cannons. The battle lasted until 4 pm when the Ottoman soldiers inside the besieged Turkish garrison raised a white flag and surrendered.

=== Social stratification ===
Socially, the residents of Metsovo, up until the beginning of the 20th century, were divided into three classes: the "arhontzi" (arxondzɨ), the "vinitsi" (vinitsɨ) and the "algi" (alɟi) or, mockingly, "gizari" (ɟizari). This socioeconomic stratification developed during the Ottoman occupation.

==== Árhontzi ====
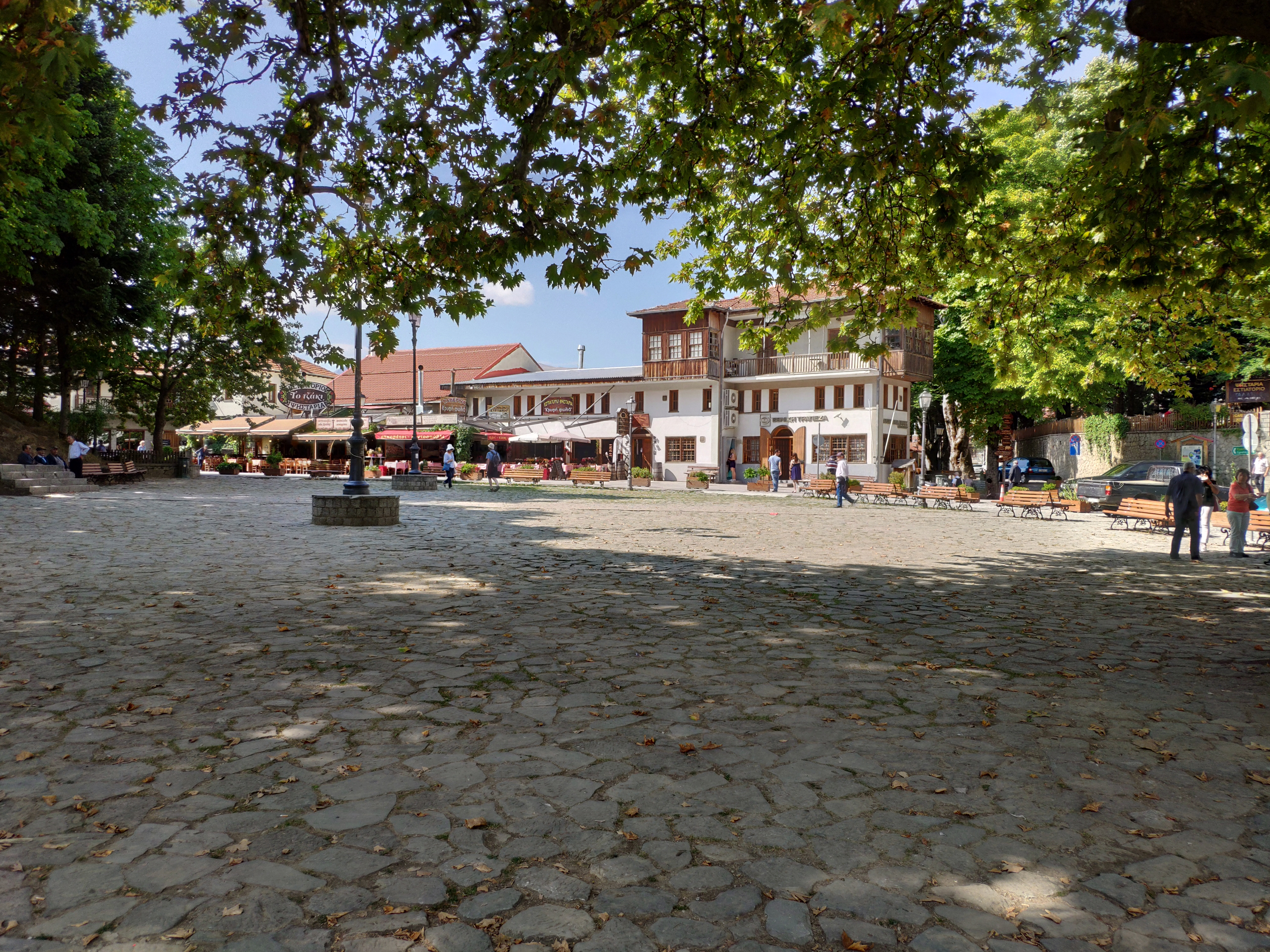
Main square

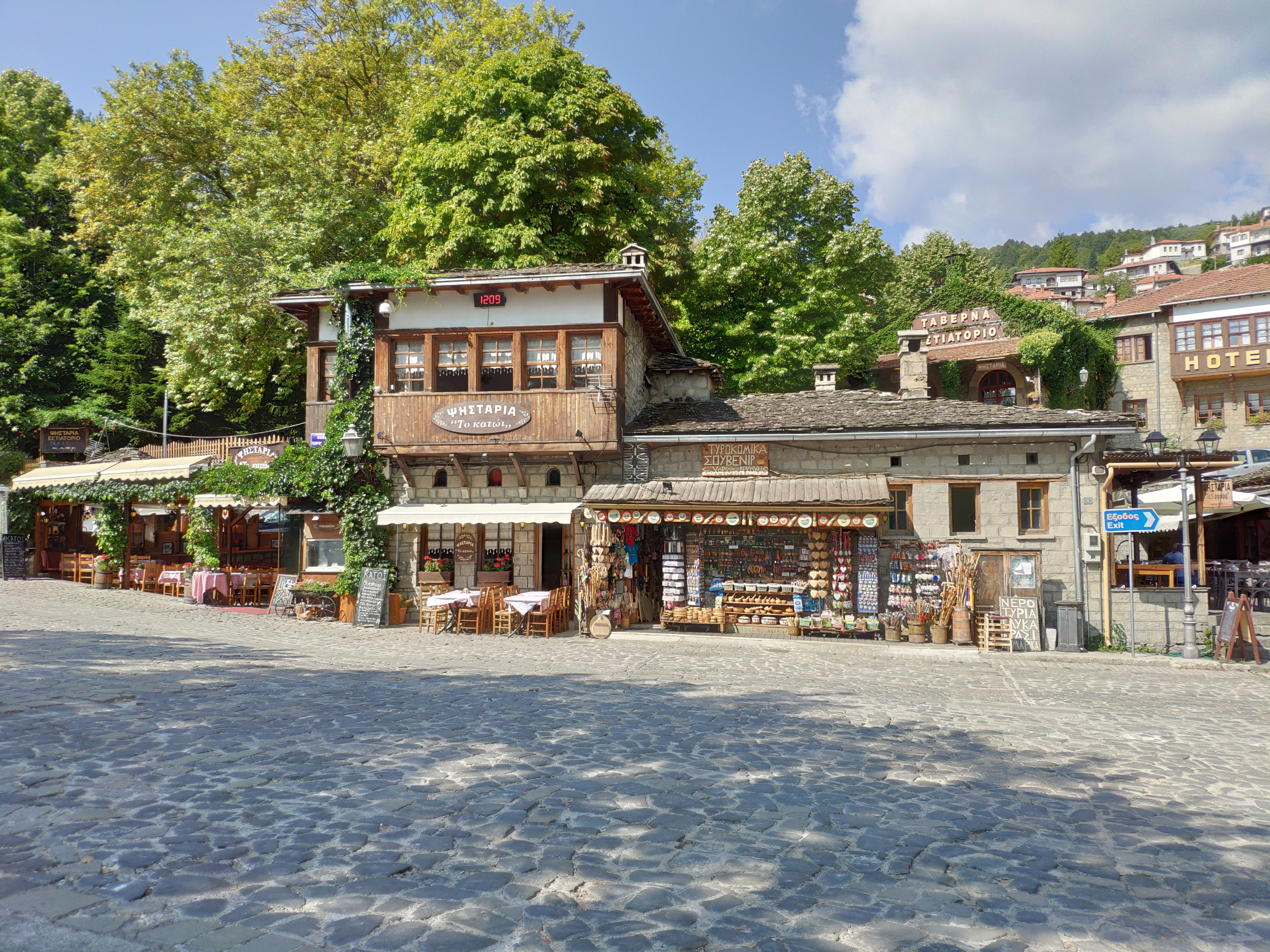
Stores of the main square

The arhontzi were the wealthiest part of society. Their revenues derived from wholesale and retail commercial activities. Although locally very powerful, they were not a closed group in terms of social mobility. Wealth gave anyone the right to climb up the social ladder to the next higher level, although such ascent often gave rise to serious conflicts.

==== Vínitsi ====
The vinitsi comprised the middle and lower classes of the settlement that were not occupied in livestock breeding. It mostly included farmers, small business owners, technicians, mule drivers, and small-scale merchants. Despite the economic and professional diversification among the vinitsi, they saw themselves as a unified social class, which was evident in their social relations. For example, they would marry among themselves but never with members of the algi.

==== Álgi ====
The algi were the class of traveling sheepherders, whose occupation was large-scale sheepherding, livestock breeding, as well as woodcarving. They had set rules regarding the social roles of their members, and a strict patriarchal structure that governed their class.

==== Distinctions between vinitsi and algi ====
The social differences between the two lower classes were not based on income criteria but on the fact that their members came from very different economic structures. In the past, the distinction between sheepherders and non-sheepherders existed in all developed Aromanian settlements of Pindos, and could possibly be concealing, in a latent form, the socioeconomic reality of past times. This was not a class distinction based on wealth, since in most cases the members of both groups belonged to the poorer segments of the population, but a differentiation related to the establishment of the settlements during the Ottoman period, which produced the co-existence of populations with the same linguistic base but with clearly different economic and social structures.

=== Ottoman tax district ===
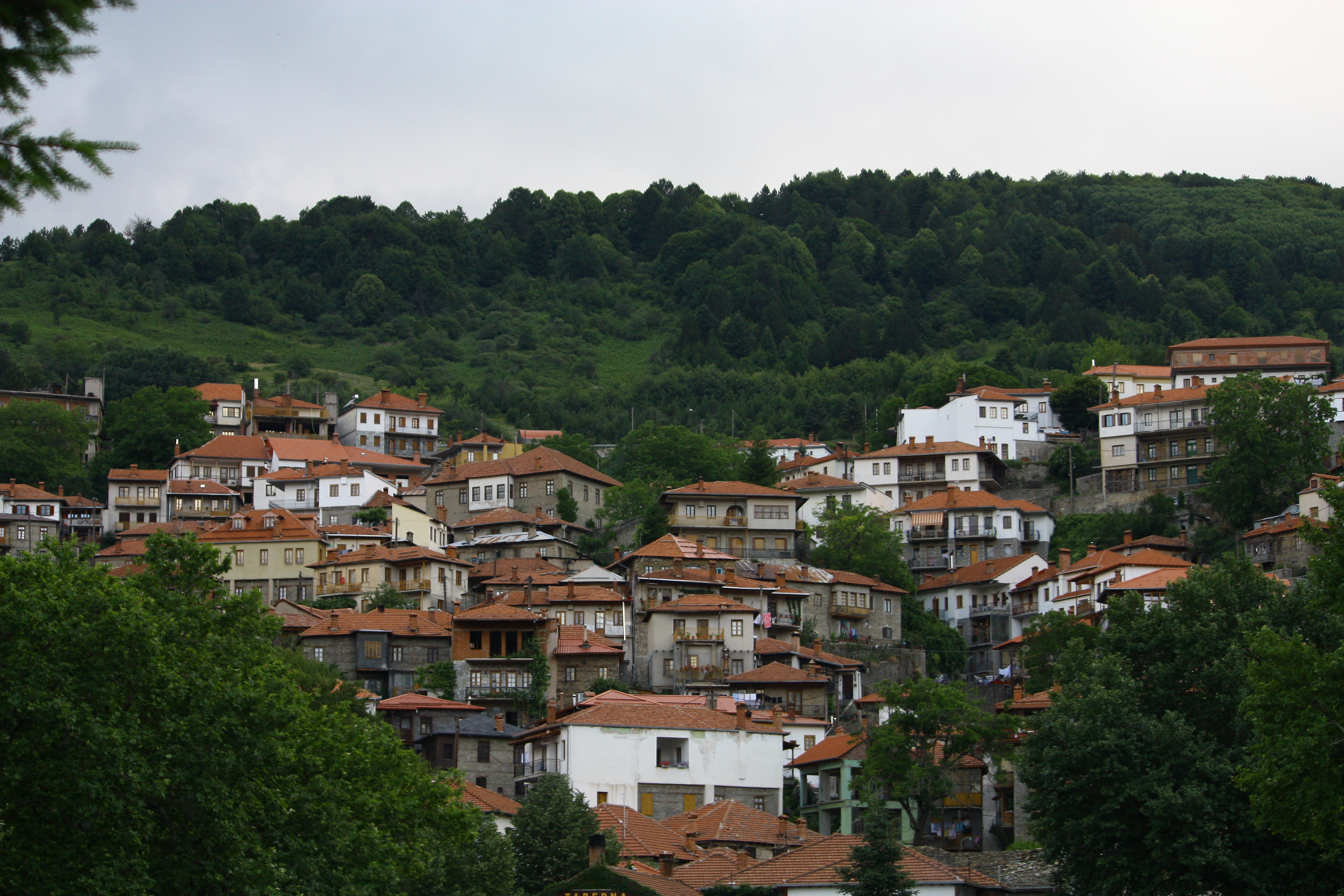
Buildings of Metsovo.

Karye-iMiçova denoted the tax district of the Ottoman timar that constituted the area of Metsovo. Six settlements are recorded in it. Each settlement's name is preceded by the indication "karye" and usually followed by the phrase tâbi'-iMiçova meaning "subject to Metsovo".

The word karye, as a term in the organizational structure of the Ottoman Empire, defined a settlement or a group of settlements constituting a unified tax district. In the Greek language it is usually translated by the word "chorion". However, it does not correspond to the term "settlement" as used in modern statistical terminology, but rather to "community". In other words, it does not signify a group of buildings, but a well-defined geographical area with a self-contained legal entity. A karye could include more than one settlements regardless how far apart they were from each other.

In the 1506 census, Karye-iMiçova is followed by the phrase "tâbi'-i Τirhala" meaning "subject to Trikala". The names of eight settlements appear in it. Before the name of each settlement, the indication "karye" of the 1454–55 census has been replaced by "mahalle". The specific administrative structure of the area constituted the basis for its administrative organization in the centuries to come. In administrative documents of the 18th century, the present settlement of Metsovo is termed "chora" and the other villages as "mahalades".

=== The privileges of Metsovo ===
Starting in the mid-17th century, the residents in the region of Metsovo were relieved from the obligation to pay the regular and ad hoc taxes that were usually paid by Christian residents in other Ottoman regions, on the condition that they would pay a lump sum per year. The Ottoman administration often made such arrangements for groups of its subjects that offered a special service to the state.

==== The case of Metsovo ====
The special service provided by the Metsovo residents was the guarding of the local mountain passes and the servicing of travelers. The special tax regime did not mean self-government in theory. The notion of autonomy was unknown to the Ottoman understanding of polity. In practice, however, the granting of tax exemptions was equivalent to self-governance of the area.

Since the 18th century, the management of lasa, or bequests left to a community, constituted one of the most important municipal functions. The love for their birthplace and the social altruism of the Metsovites living abroad resulted in the amassing of significant benefactor funds in Metsovo. As early as the beginning of the 19th century, there was a special logbook where the wills and testaments of the benefactors were recorded. The logbook was destroyed in 1854; it was then redrafted by the patriarchal exarchate of Metsovo but destroyed again in 1941.

==== Management of state property ====
In theory, the sultan was the undisputed owner of all land in Metsovo and had the right to dispose of it as he wished. That is why firmans were only temporarily applicable and defined the area as the property of Ottoman officials, to whom the Sultan granted tenure rights.

==== Reduced taxes ====
The reduction of taxes meant keeping a larger share of the local surplus crop production. In consequence, regardless of the theoretical framework that governed the land ownership and political regime of the Ottoman Empire, the lands of Metsovo were gradually falling under the absolute possession, ownership, and management of its residents, which corresponded to political self-governance. This development had a cost. Every year, the corresponding taxes and other contributions had to be pre-paid to the Ottoman landlord of the area, otherwise the Chora or Mukataa of Metsovo could lose its status and be combined with neighboring Ottoman regions.

==== The phenomenon of beneficence ====
Beneficence by Metsovites is a powerful phenomenon, the dimensions of which were formed through the processes relating to the socioeconomic growth of Metsovo during the Ottoman period. It is mainly the expression of the cultural notions that governed the ruling class of Metsovo at the time. Despite the long absence of the men of the community from Metsovo, due to their business and commercial activities, their hometown remains in their hearts as their financial and family seat. Consequently, a large part of their revenue is channeled into the local economy by themselves or their families, as charity or investment capital to be used for the conservation of the social and political superiority of their class.

Beneficence as a notion is directly connected with the special political regime granted by the Ottoman state to the Chora Metsovou. The demonstration of altruism, signaling and confirming their social distinction and status, provides Metsovites with the option to have social and economic control of their homeland. At first, their social solidarity is expressed as a church-sponsoring funding activity according to the standards of a cultural notion that derives from the medieval past of the Orthodox church.

=== The Exarchate of Metsovo ===
After 1659, the area of Metsovo, thus far under the bishopric of Stagoi, was formed into its own exarchate under a patriarchal exarch. The "Catholic Exarch of Metsovo"—a person appointed by the Patriarch of Constantinople—resided in Constantinople and was paid 15 kuruşlar annually for his role as supervisor of the region. In actuality, his duties were performed by a local clergyman, who was elected by the people of Metsovo, approved by the patriarchate, and was obliged to act in the name of the catholic exarch. From 1818, the election of the clergyman was by vote of the ephors of the schools of Metsovo, with his election then being ratified by the patriarchate. The spiritual jurisdiction of the exarch comprised the settlements of Metsovo, Anilio, Derventista (now Anthohori), Votonosi, Milia, Koutsioufleani (now Platanistos), and Malakasi. In 1924, the Exarchate of Metsovo was temporarily upgraded to a metropolis, in order to accommodate the placement of clergy from Asia Minor who had lost their seats. In 1929, the metropolis was abolished without reinstating the exarchate. The region came under the Metropolis of Grevena until 1932, when Metsovo, Anilio, Votonosi and Derventista were annexed to the Metropolis of Ioannina. The Exarchate of Metsovo, functioning as the local representative of the religious ideals of the Patriarchate, played a major part in the formation of the religious and national conscience of the higher social classes of Metsovo.

==== The scholars and clergy of Metsovo ====
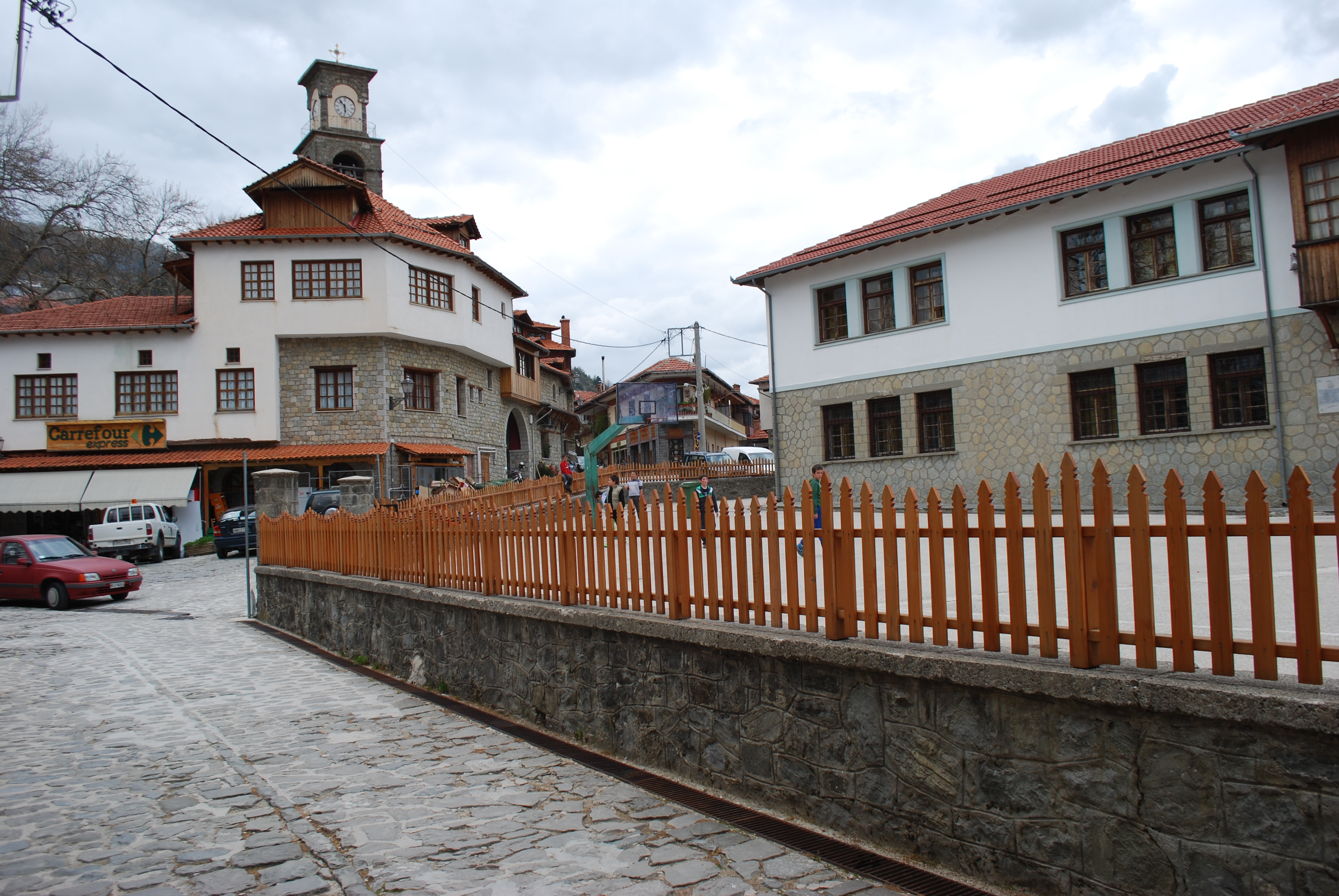
School in Metsovo.

The economic and social growth of Metsovo during the 18th century is reflected in the efforts of the residents to upgrade their level of education. Indicative of these efforts is the establishment of a school as early as the beginning of the 18th century, the continuous care to maintain its operation, and studying abroad in European universities to receive higher education. The result of this process is the appearance of a class of scholars, teachers, and clergymen who participate actively in the intellectual life in the territories of modern Greece. Among these scholars we find Parthenios Katzoulis, Anastasios Metsovitis, Konstantinos of Metsovo, Tryfon of Metsovo, Demetrios Vardakas, Adam Tsapekos, Anastasios of Metsovo, Dositheos Driinoupoleos, Konstantinos Peltekis, Konstantinos Tzikas, Triantafyllos Hatzis Stergiou, Christoforos Varlamitis, the Kyriakos brothers, Konstantinos and Theofilos Tzarzoulis, as well as their father Nikolaos Tzartzoulis who is considered one of the "Teachers of the Nation" by Greek historians.

=== The merchants of Metsovo ===
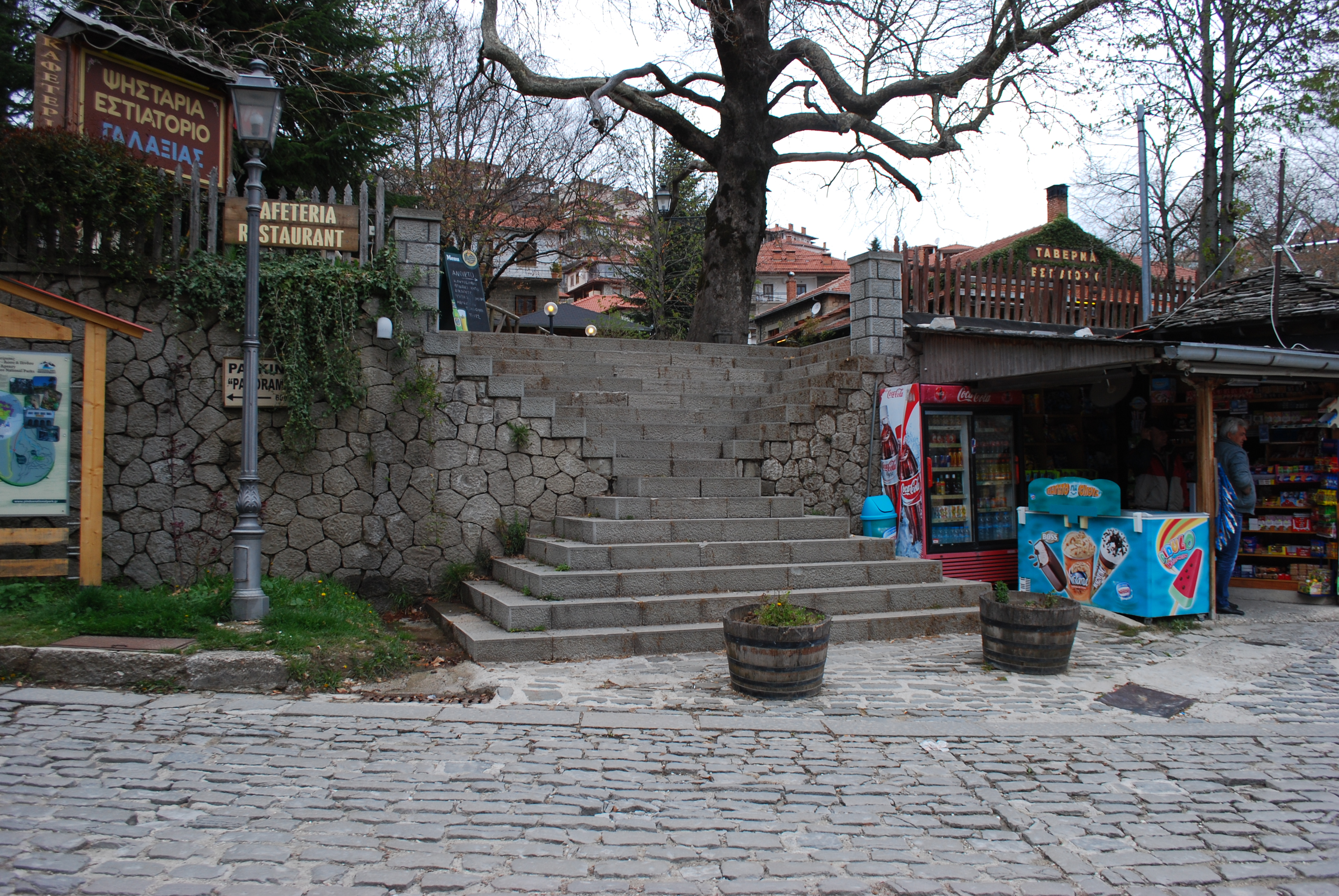
Staircase in the market area (central square) of Metsovo

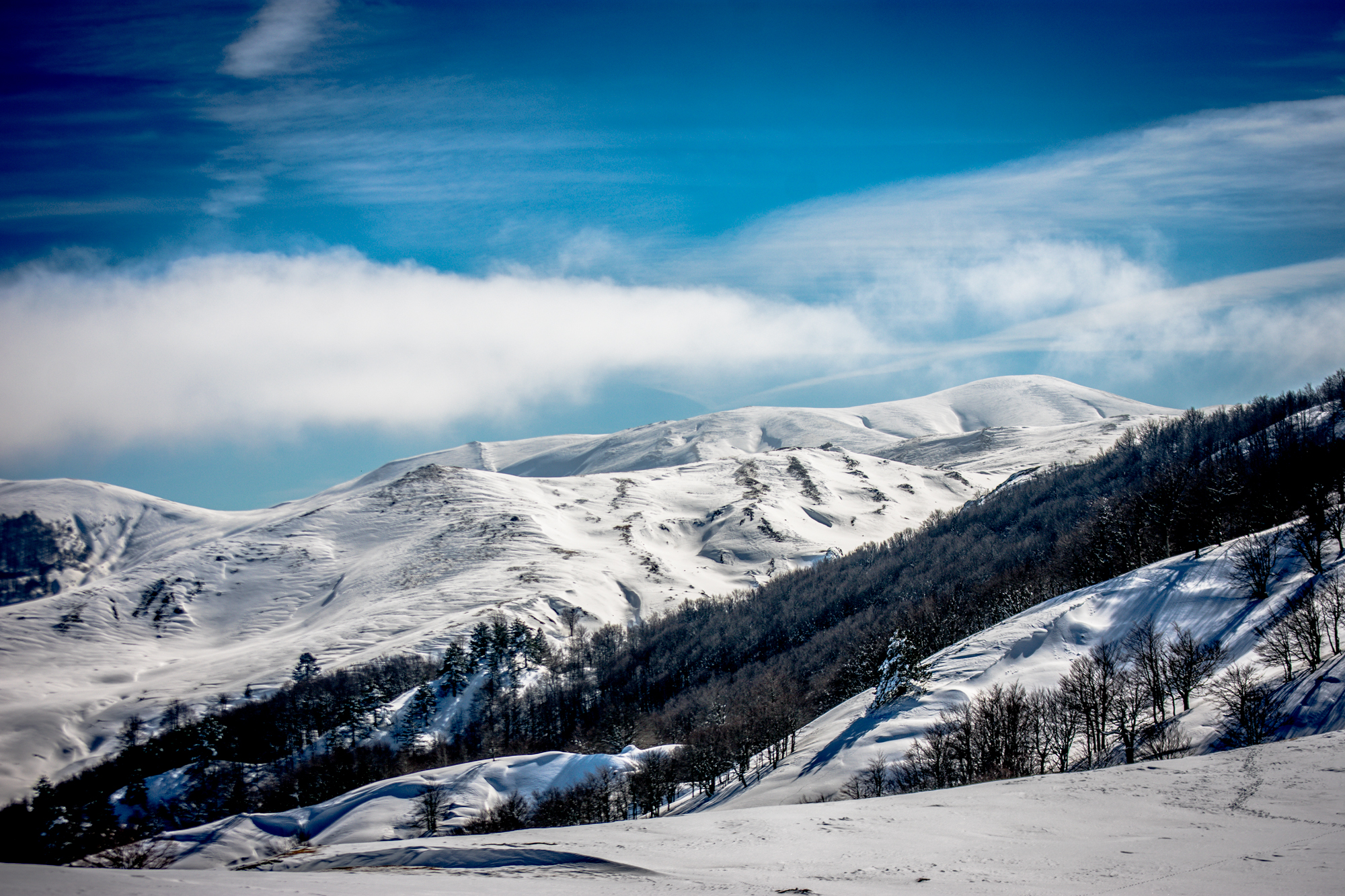
Anilio ski center

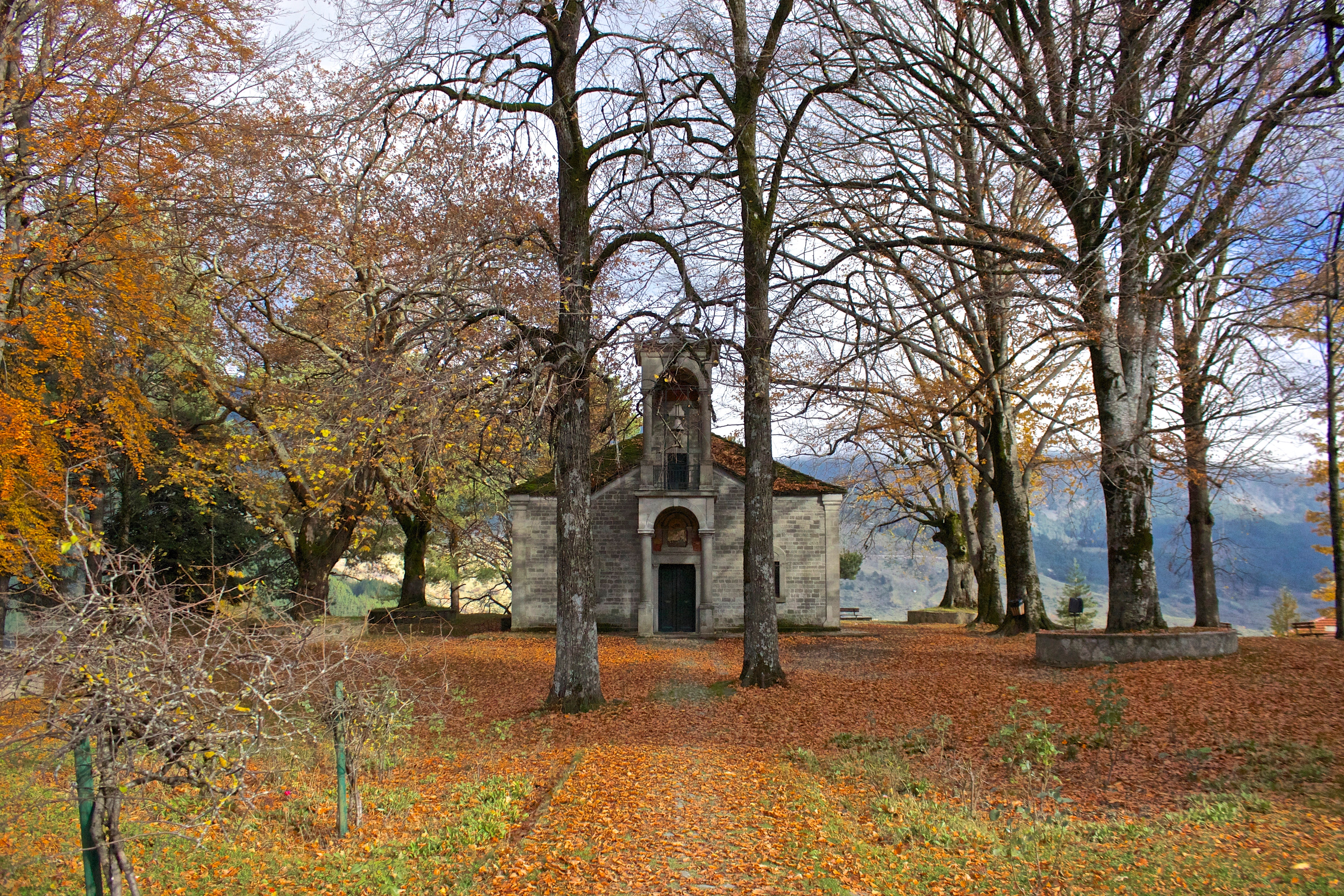
Church of St George in Metsovo

The merchants in Metsovo were peddlers that became very active in commercial trade, in both the Ottoman Empire and in Europe.

==== Socioeconomic growth of Metsovo ====
The impressive socioeconomic growth of Metsovo during the Ottoman occupation is mainly due to the involvement of a large part of its population in the commercial activities of both the Ottoman Empire and of Europe. Taking into account the fact that the residents of Metsovo had been migrating for a long time, it is difficult to determine the beginning of its commercial growth.

==== Testimonies – sources ====
Substantial information about the commercial development of Metsovo are found from the mid-17th century onward, when we see testimonies of the presence of peddlers from Metsovo in Constantinople and Venice, which indicates an early phase of their involvement in commercial trade in the eastern Mediterranean. During the 18th century we see testimonies of the presence of Metsovite merchants in Constantinople, Bucharest, and Vienna. By the end of the 18th century there is an established community of merchants in Metsovo, which, through a collaborative or overlapping trade network, spread its operations over a rather extensive geographic area.

==== 19th century ====
The first decade of the 19th century signaled the beginning of the most dynamic phase of commercial activity by the Metsovites. Now the geographic and economic reach of their activity exceeds its initial range. Their activity extends as far as Moscow, Cairo, Malta, Livorno, and Trieste.

==== Cities of activity ====
Records show that Metsovite merchants had a permanent presence in the following cities and towns: Corfu, Serres, Filippoupoli, Odessa, Brody, Moscow, Petersburg, Sevastopol, Nizna, Thessaloniki, in the Romanian cities of Orsova, Chisinau, Iasi, Ismail (Bessarabia), Craiova, Focsani, Galatsi, and Odessa, and a presence in the trade fairs and open-air markets of Perlepe, Sistov, Uzungiova, Rostov, Smyrna, Cyprus, and Damascus. Naturally, the old trade strongholds of Constantinople, Bucharest, and Vienna continued to present the largest concentrations of Metsovite merchants.

==== Alexandria ====
Another significant overseas hub of commercial activity for Metsovites is the port of Alexandria, in Egypt. The latest records show that the nature of their trading has changed dramatically from the times of their traditional land transport and trade fairs in the Balkans. Although the traditional method of commerce still occupies the merchants that are based in Metsovo or Ioannina, a large number of Metsovite merchants has established trading companies and agencies in distant places where they are occupied with all types of import and export trade.

== Province ==
The province of Metsovo (Greek: Επαρχία Μετσόβου) was one of the provinces of the Ioannina Prefecture. Its territory corresponded with that of the current municipality of Metsovo, except for most of the municipal unit of Egnatia. It was abolished in 2006.

== Municipality ==
The present municipality of Metsovo was created by the 2011 local government reform, by the merger of the following 3 former municipalities that became municipal units:

- Metsovo
- Egnatia
- Milea

The municipality of Metsovo has an area of 363.656 square kilometres (140.408 sq mi), the municipal unit of Metsovo has an area of 177.676 square kilometres (68.601 sq mi), and the community of Metsovo has an area of 101.908 square kilometres (39.347 sq mi).

== Demographics ==
Year	Community	Municipal unit	Municipality
1981	2,705	–	–
1991	2,917	4,125	–
2001	3,195	4,417	–
2011	2,503	3,469	6,196
2021	2,337	3,254	5,432

== Climate ==
Metsovo has a temperate climate with snowy winters and pleasant summers. Precipitation is high all year with a drying trend in summer.

Climate data for Metsovo town (1,240m)
Month	Jan	Feb	Mar	Apr	May	Jun	Jul	Aug	Sep	Oct	Nov	Dec	Year
Mean daily maximum °C (°F)	4.1 (39.4)	5.5 (41.9)	8.6 (47.5)	12.5 (54.5)	16.6 (61.9)	21.6 (70.9)	25 (77)	25.4 (77.7)	21 (70)	15.4 (59.7)	10.7 (51.3)	6.6 (43.9)	14.4 (58.0)
Mean daily minimum °C (°F)	−1.9 (28.6)	−0.7 (30.7)	1.6 (34.9)	4.6 (40.3)	8.1 (46.6)	12.3 (54.1)	15 (59)	15.2 (59.4)	12 (54)	7.8 (46.0)	4.3 (39.7)	0.3 (32.5)	6.6 (43.8)
Average precipitation mm (inches)	185.9 (7.32)	159.6 (6.28)	130.3 (5.13)	129.5 (5.10)	133.6 (5.26)	69.3 (2.73)	44.6 (1.76)	34.8 (1.37)	132.4 (5.21)	140.6 (5.54)	182.8 (7.20)	187.6 (7.39)	1,531 (60.29)
Source: http://penteli.meteo.gr/stations/metsovo/ (2011–2016 & 2019–2020 averages)

== Transportation ==
In the 1980s, a nearby tunnel was constructed that was the longest in Greece, alleviating traffic that would otherwise clog Metsovo's twisting roads. In 2006, the junction between the A2 motorway and a section of Greek National Road (Ioannina – Trikala) made for a superhighway with two exits at Metsovo.

== Culture/attractions ==
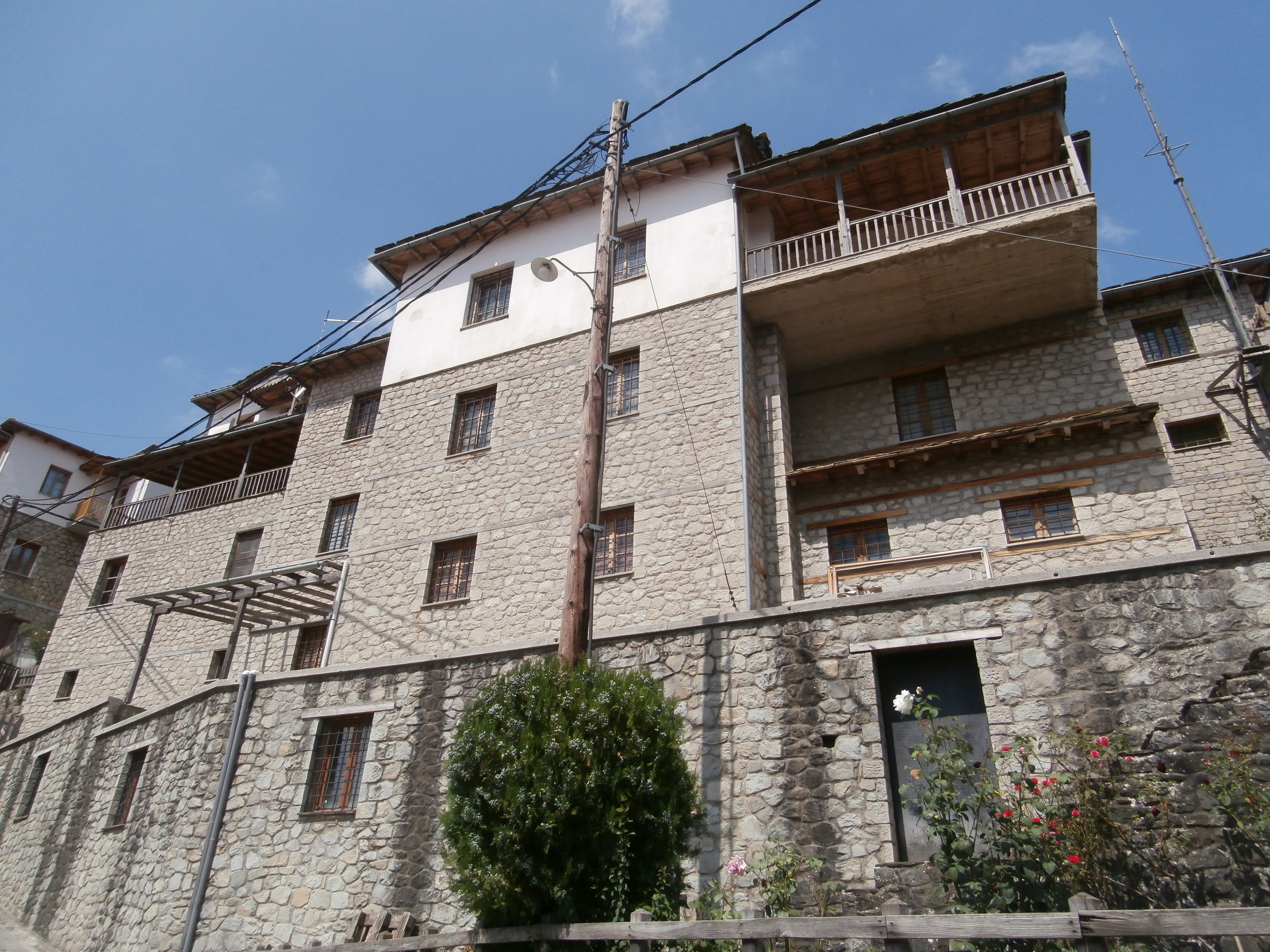
The Averoff Art Gallery building

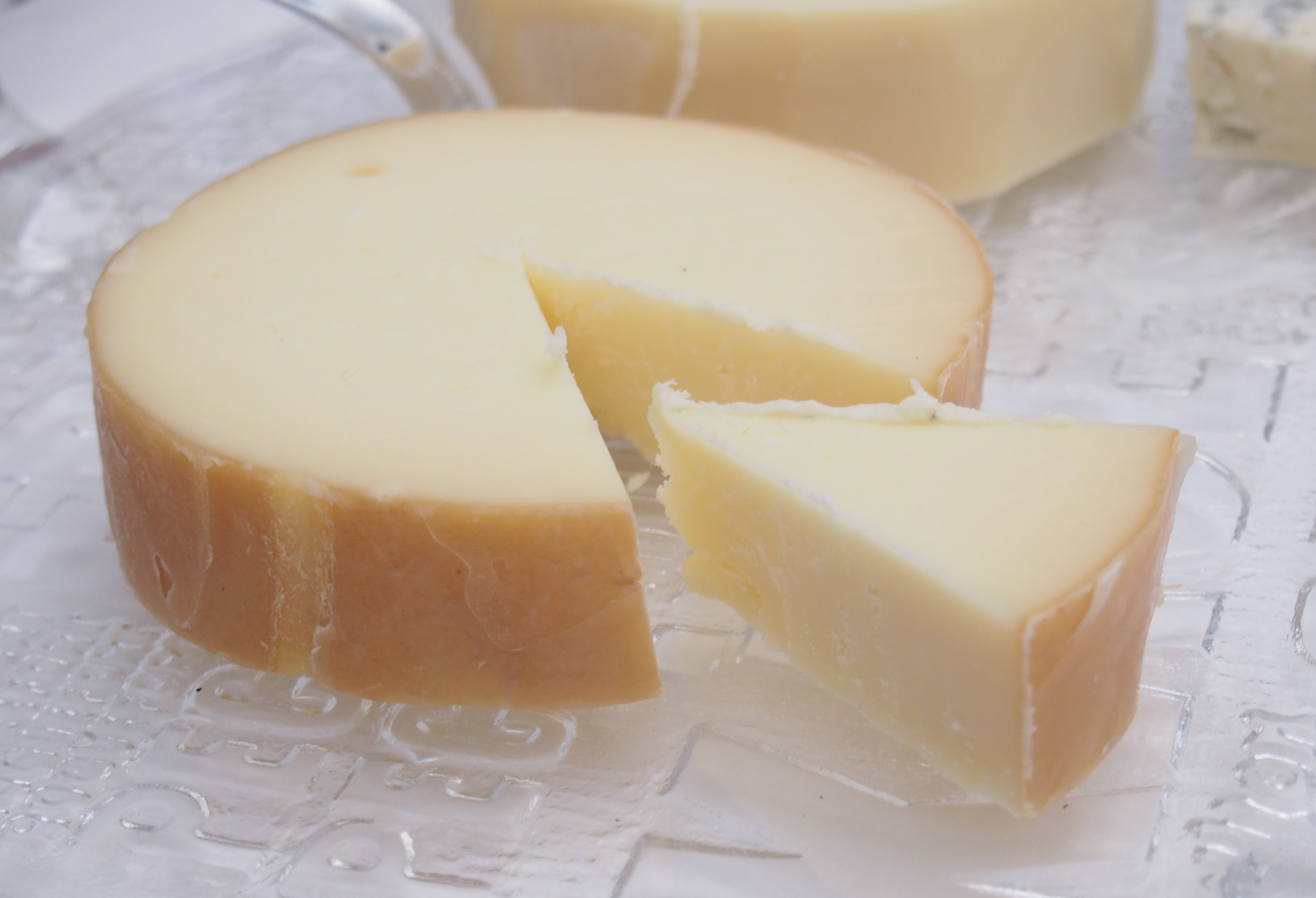
Metsovone

=== Cuisine ===
The town is famous for its local cheeses (Metsovone and Metsovela, among others) and for its winemaking industries, including the Katógi vineyard of the Averoff family.

=== Other ===
A museum named Averoff Gallery is dedicated to Georgios Averoff. Metsovo is a popular winter vacation destination and ski resort town. The Metsovo Ski Centre is situated not far from the centre of Metsovo.

Metsovo is included in the Aromanian traditional song Di la Aminciu pãn' la Ameru ("From Metsovo to Milea").

== Notable people ==
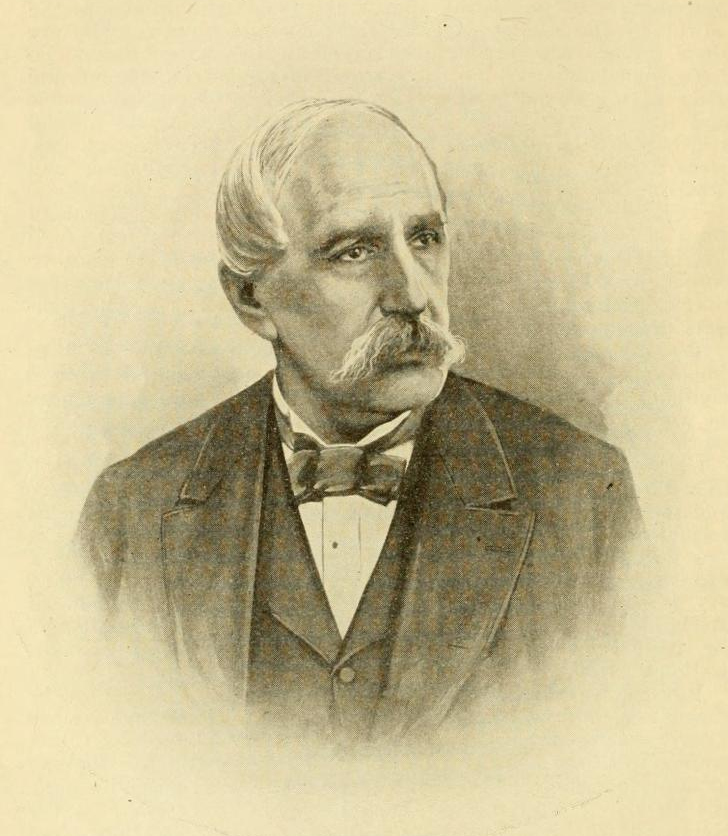
George Averoff, famous benefactor from Metsovo

Notable individuals from Metsovo include:

- George Averoff (1815–1899), benefactor
- Dimitrie Cozacovici (1790–1868), historian and founding member of the Romanian Academy
- Sterie Diamandi (1897–1981), biographer and essayist
- Kyriakos Flokas, local legendary figure
- Dimitrios Ipatros (1788–1821), member of Filiki Eteria
- Nikos Kalofiris (born 1970), skier
- Nikolaos Stournaras (1806–1853), benefactor
- Eleni Tositsa (1796–1866), benefactor
- Michael Tositsas (1787–1856), benefactor
- Timoleon Tsourekas (born 1970), skier and coach
- Nikolaos Zerzoulis (1706–1773), philosopher, mathematician and professor

== Gallery ==
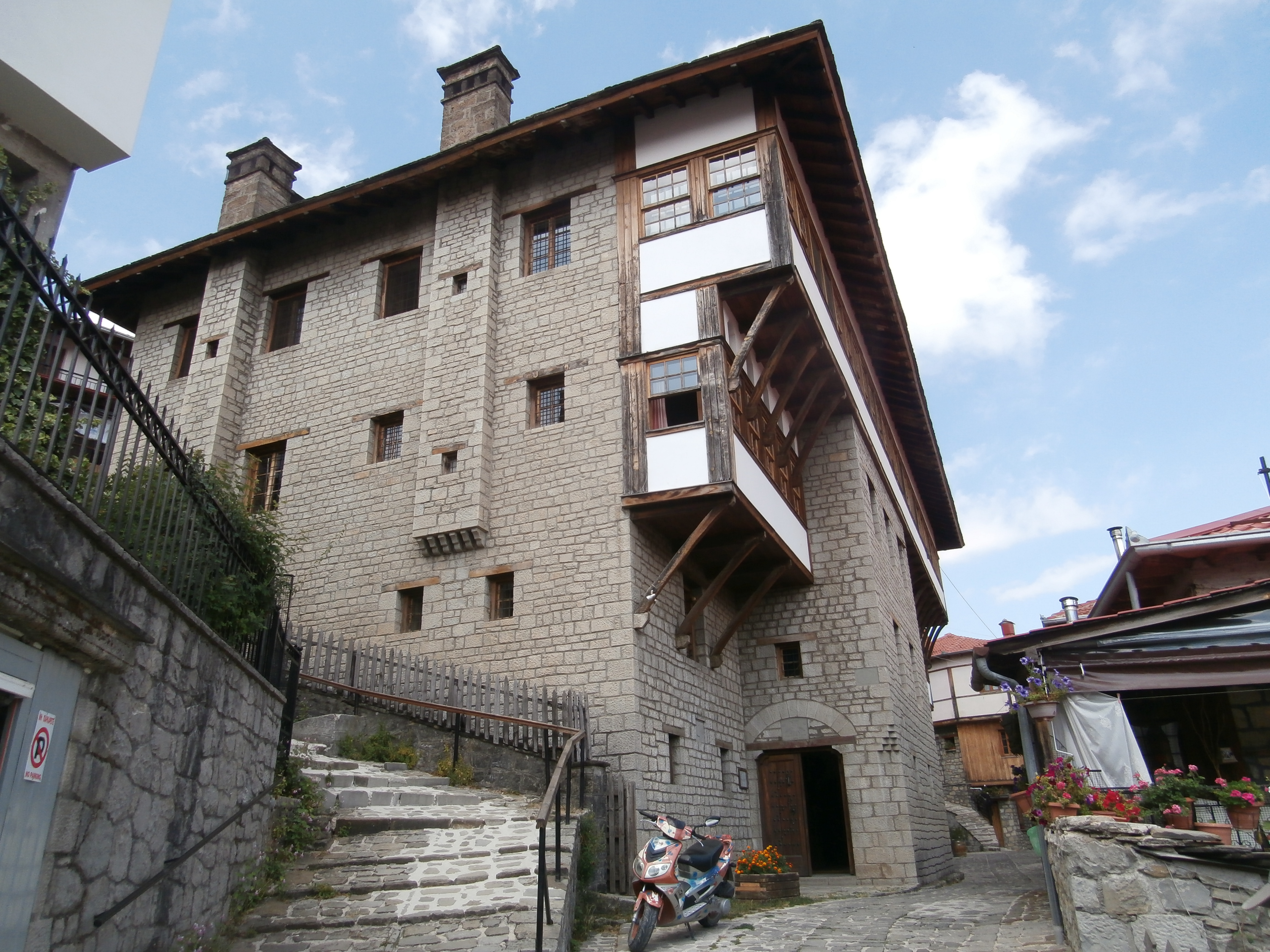
Tositsas mansion

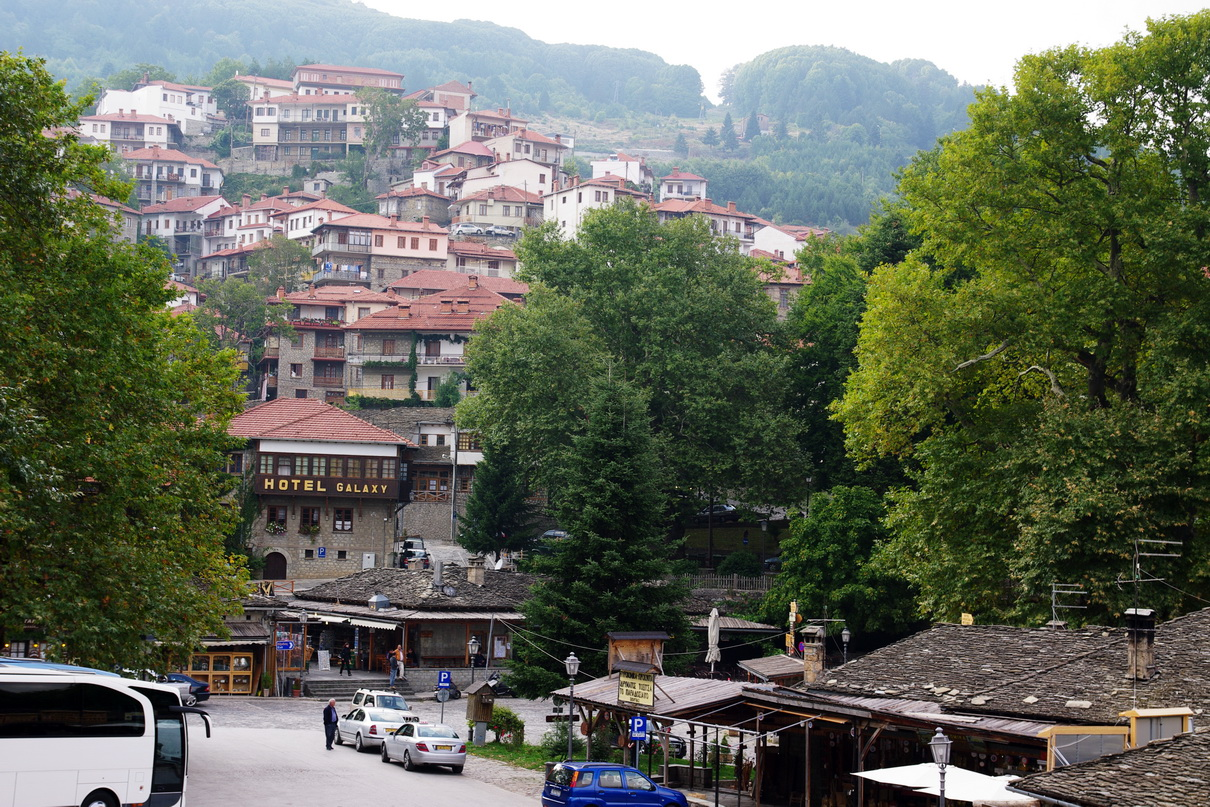
Metsovo's central square

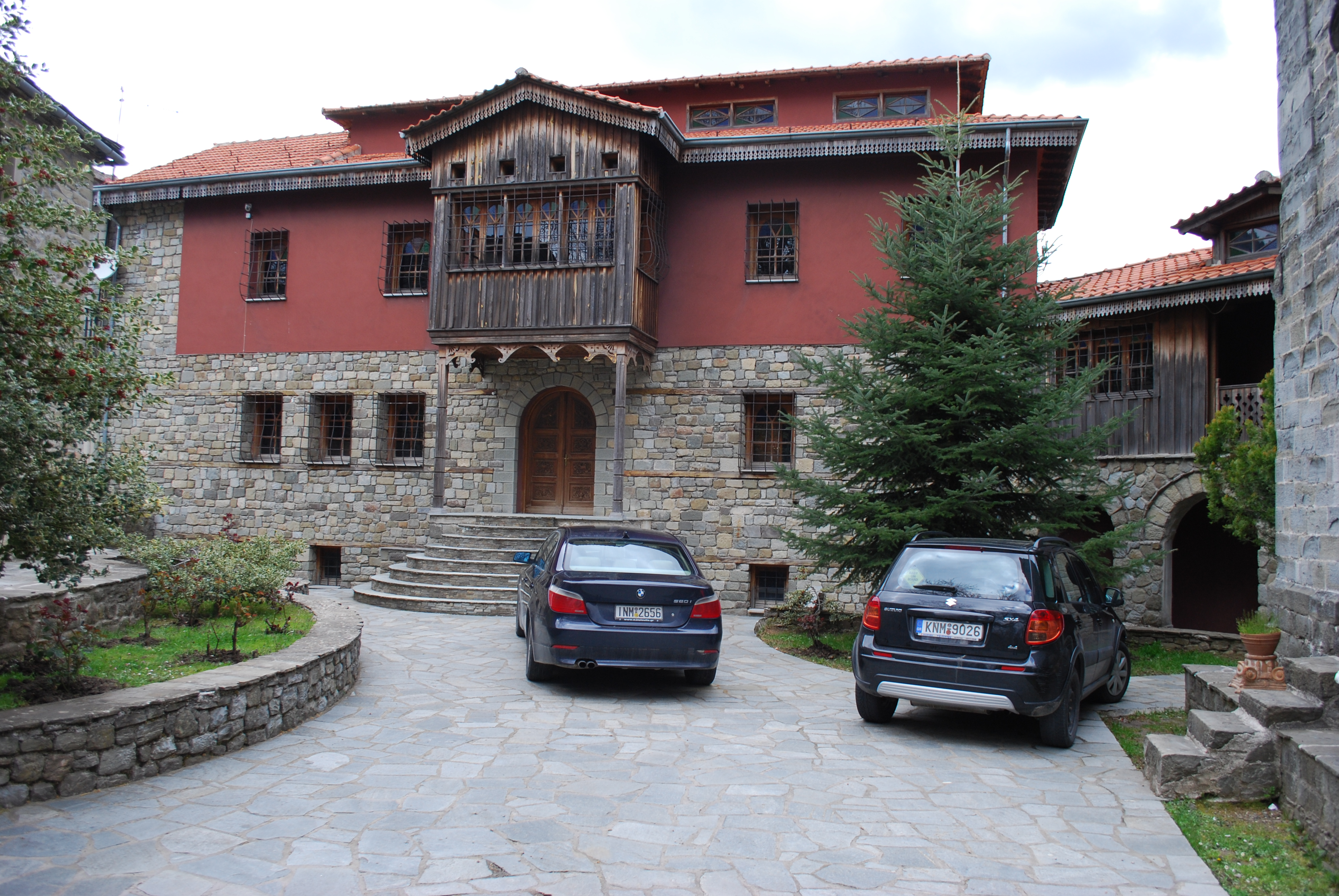
Restored mansion

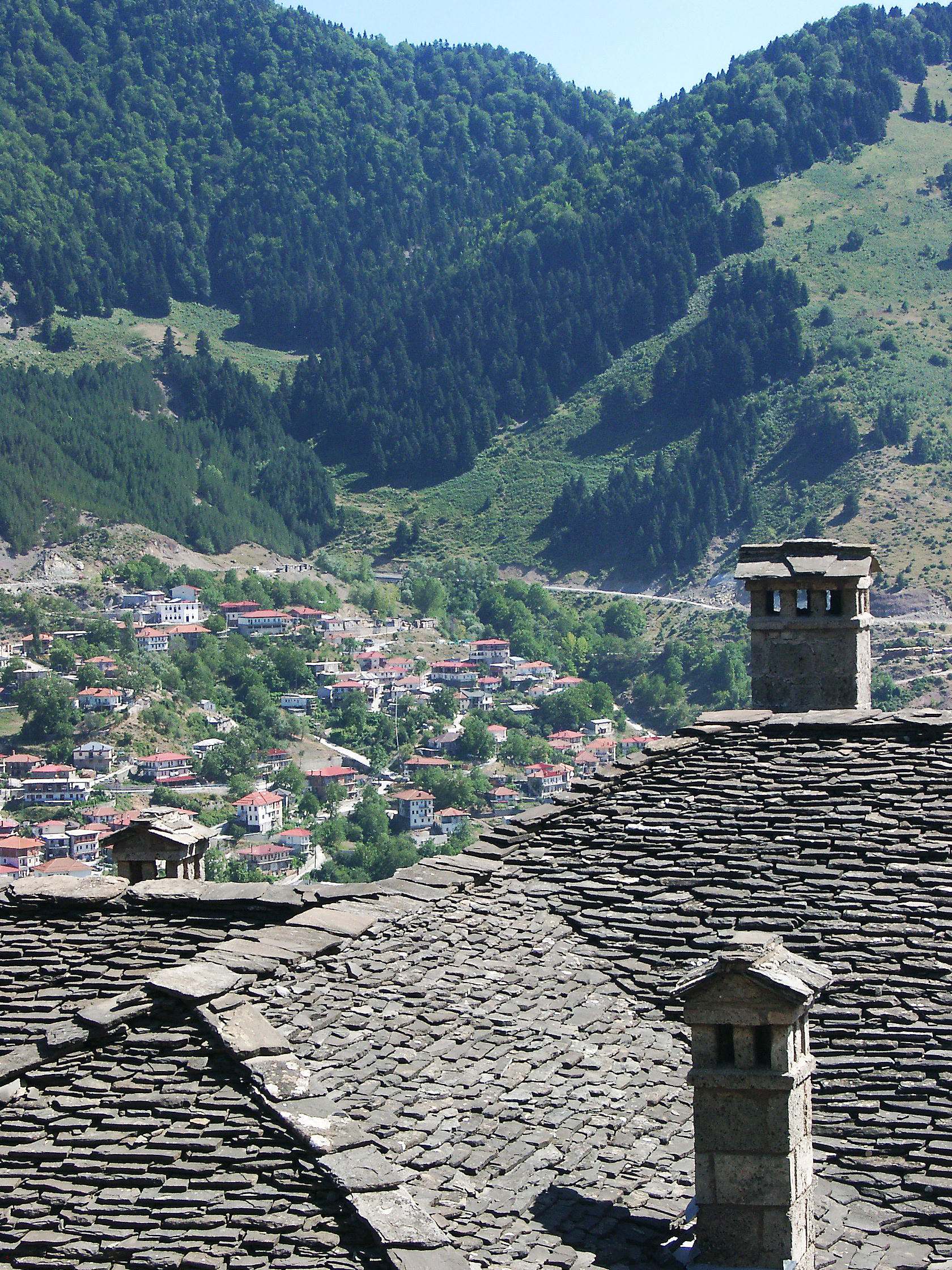
Roofs and valley of Metsovo

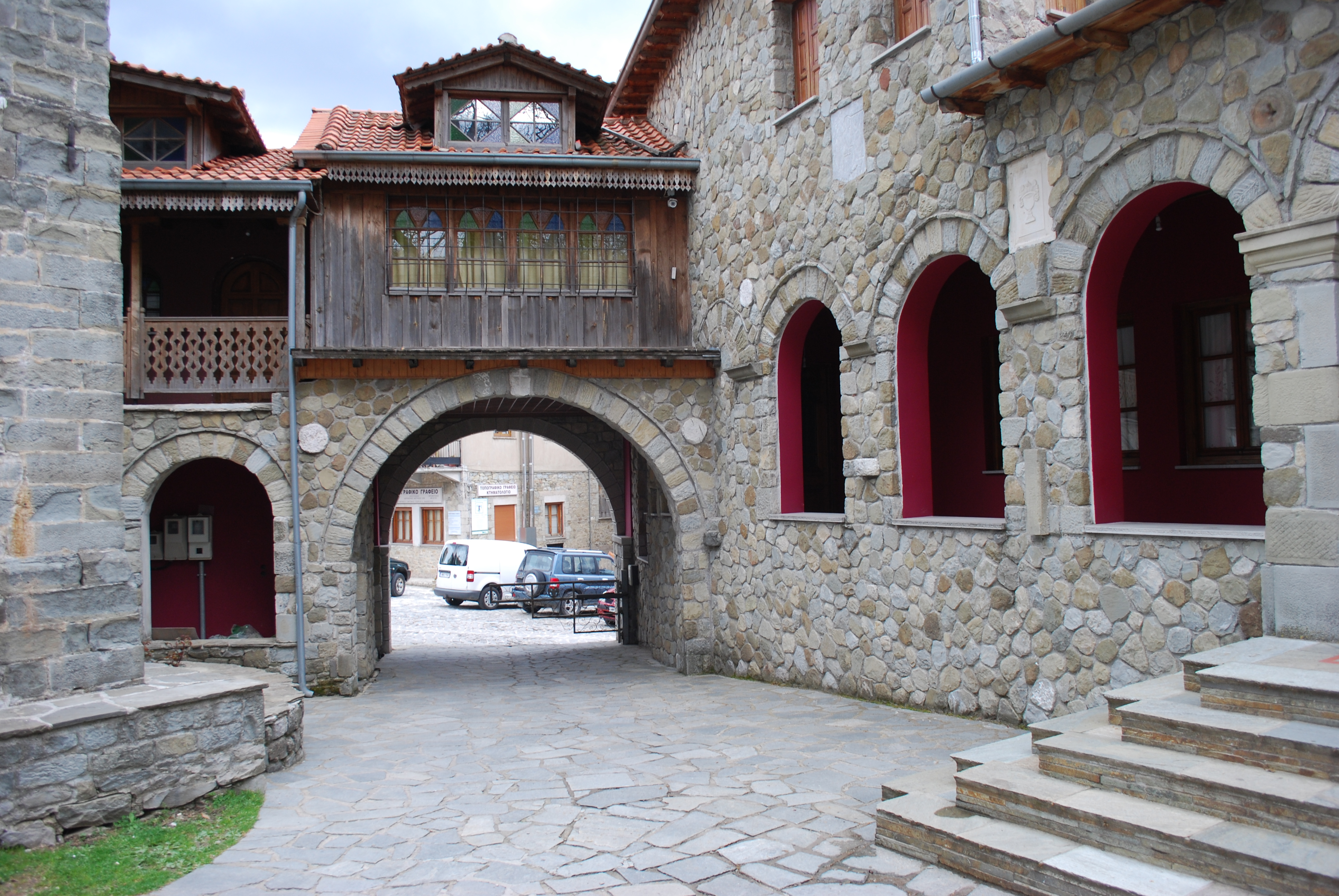
Traditional architecture

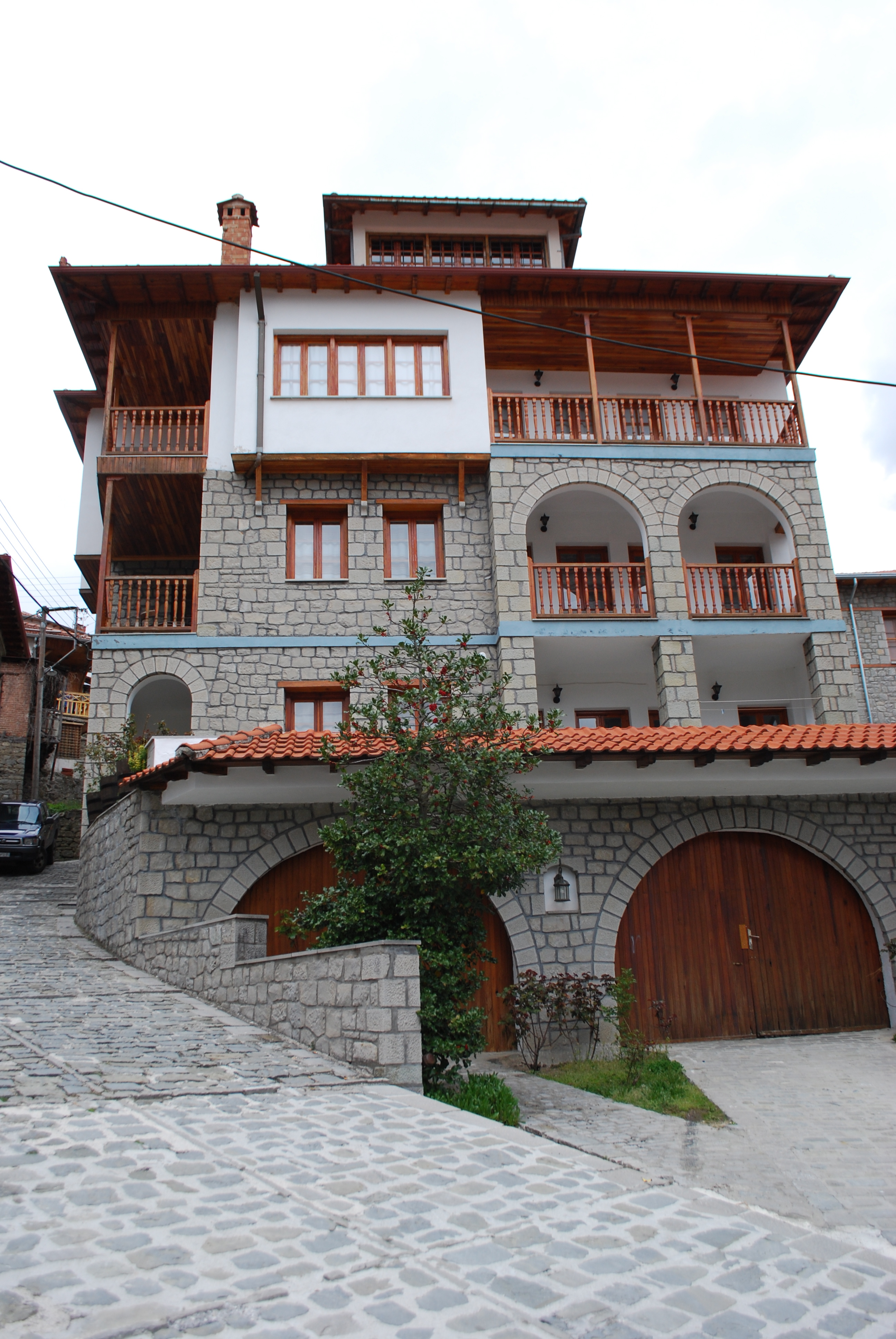
Traditional architecture in Metsovo

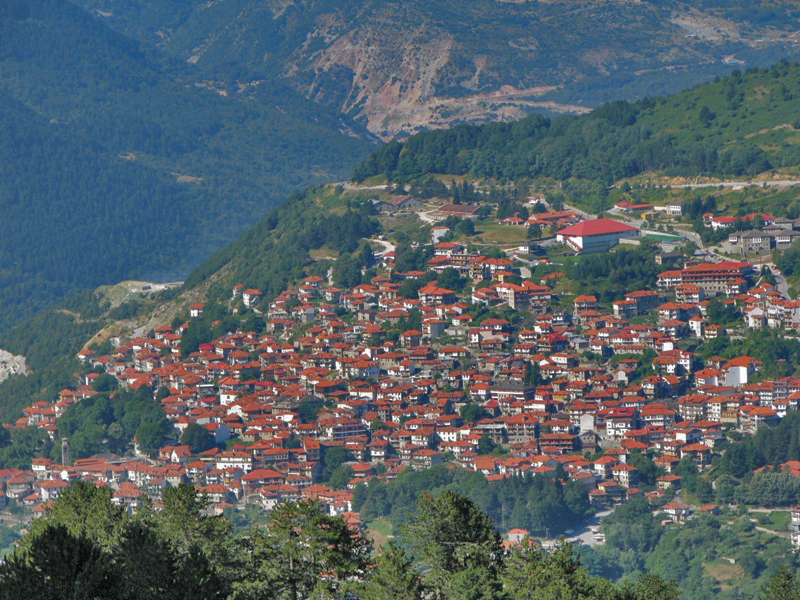
Panorama

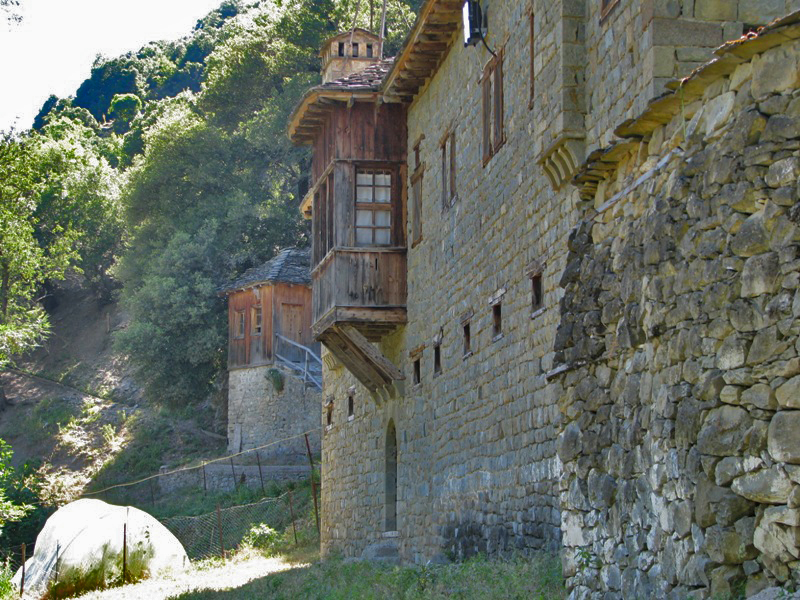
Saint Nicholas monastery

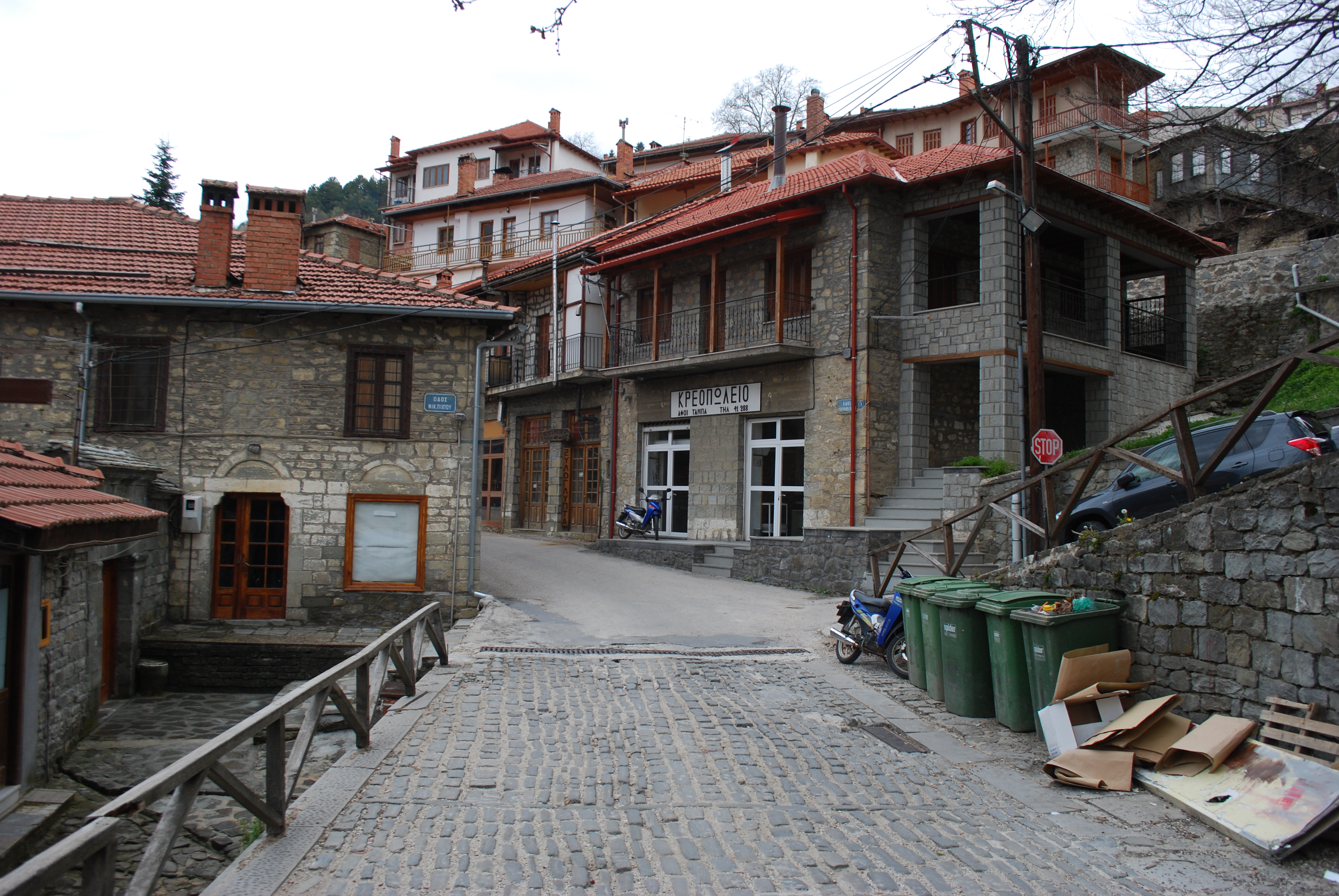
Neighbourhood in Metsovo

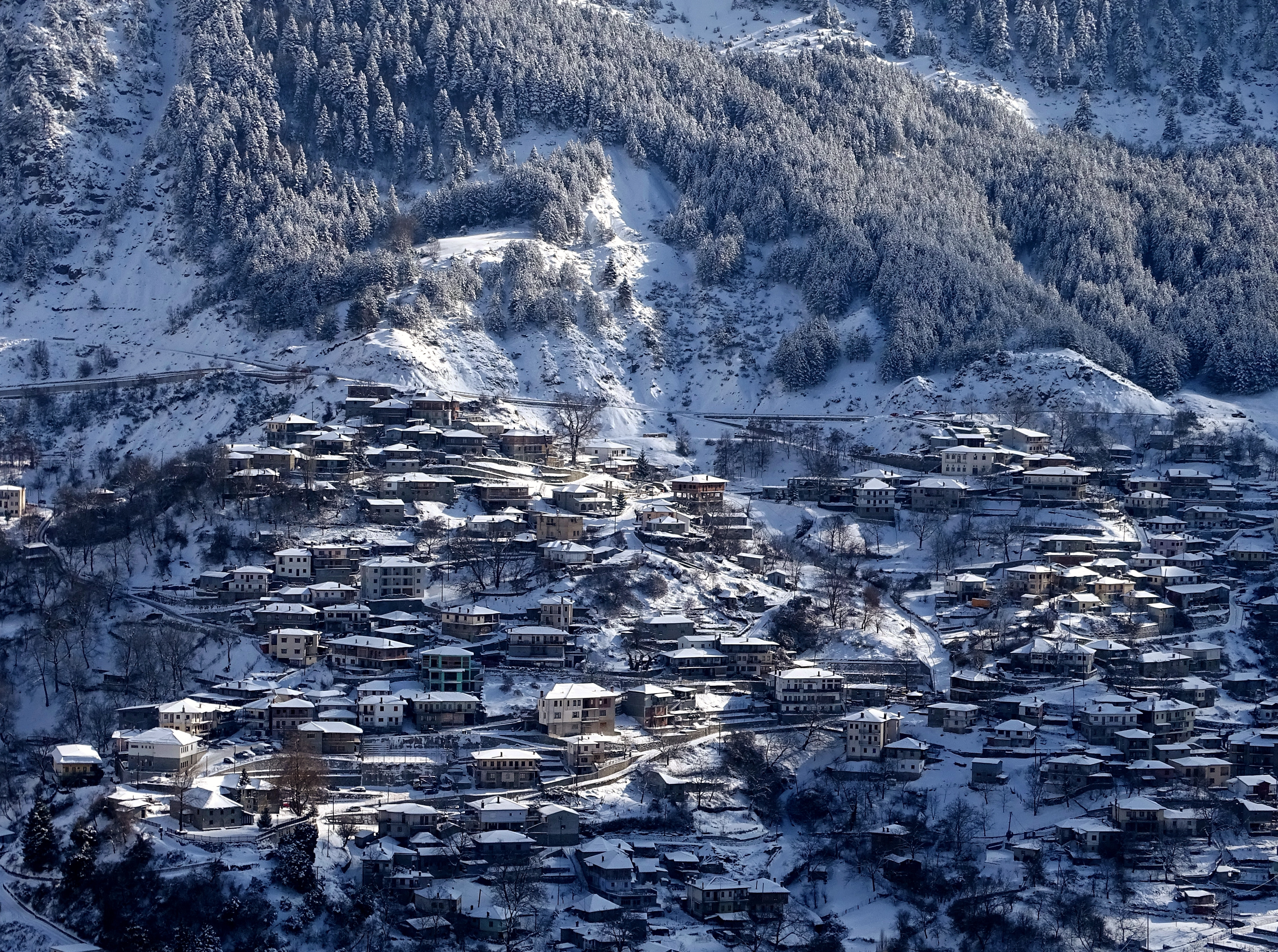
Metsovo in snow

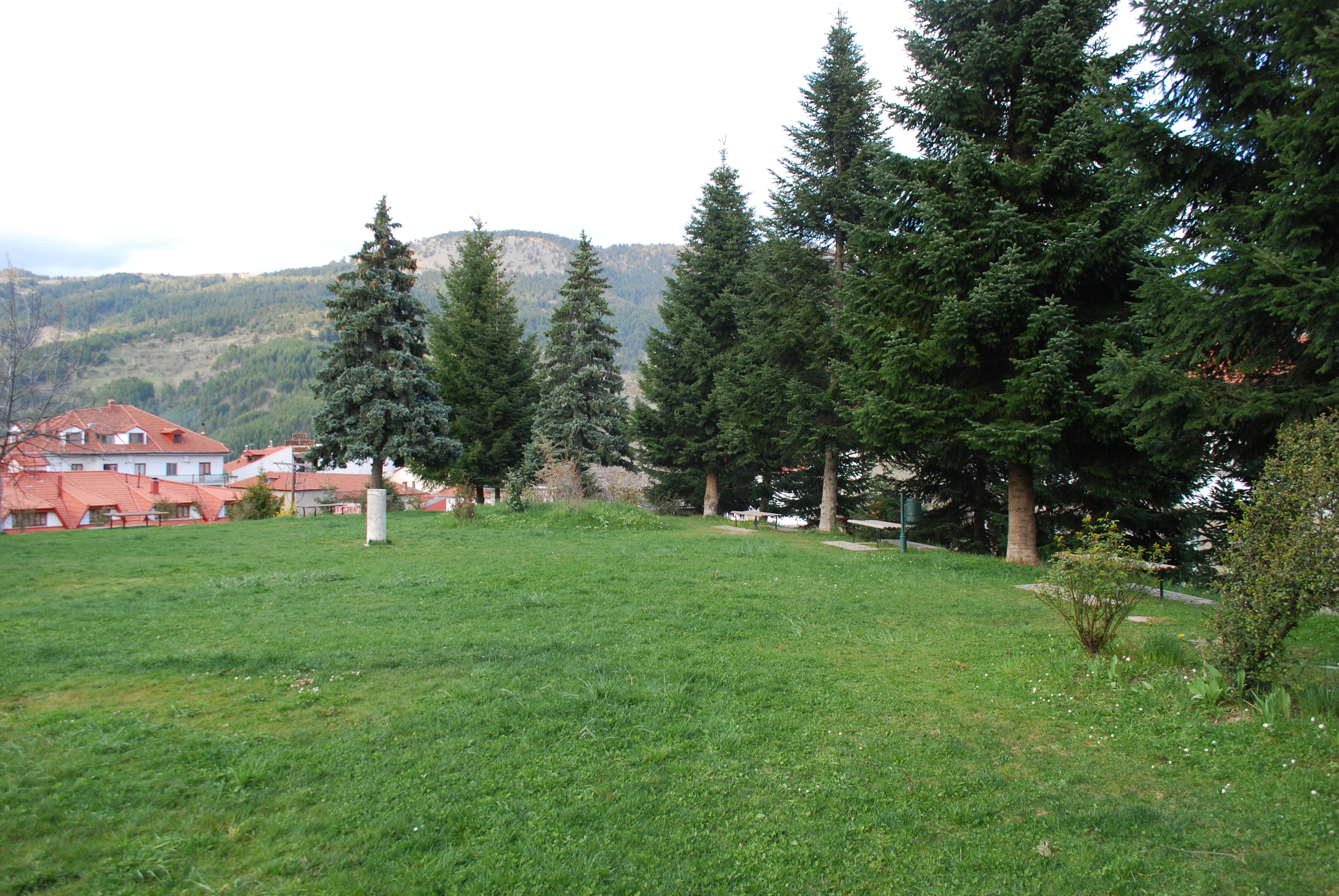
Park in Metsovo

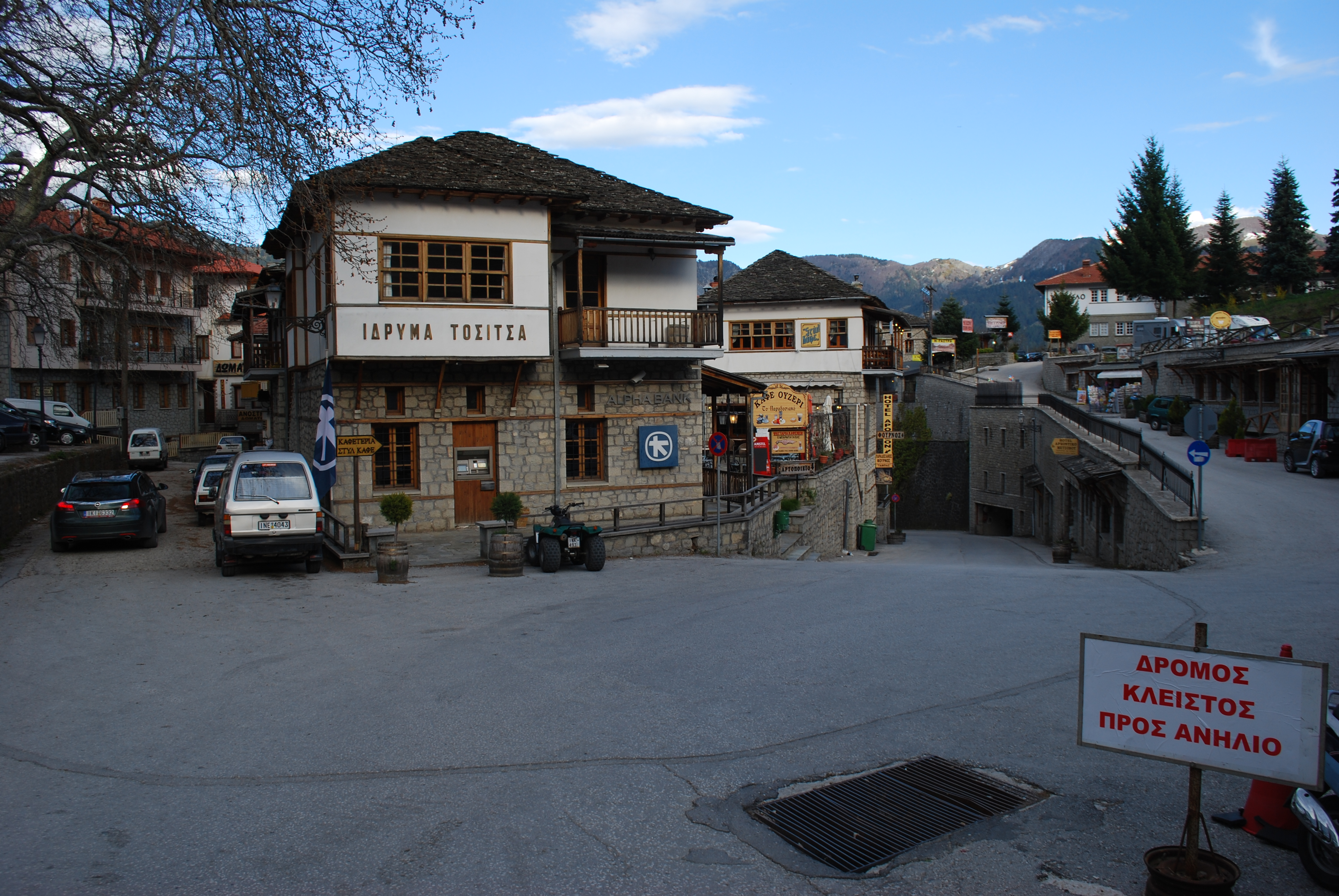
Tositsas Foundation

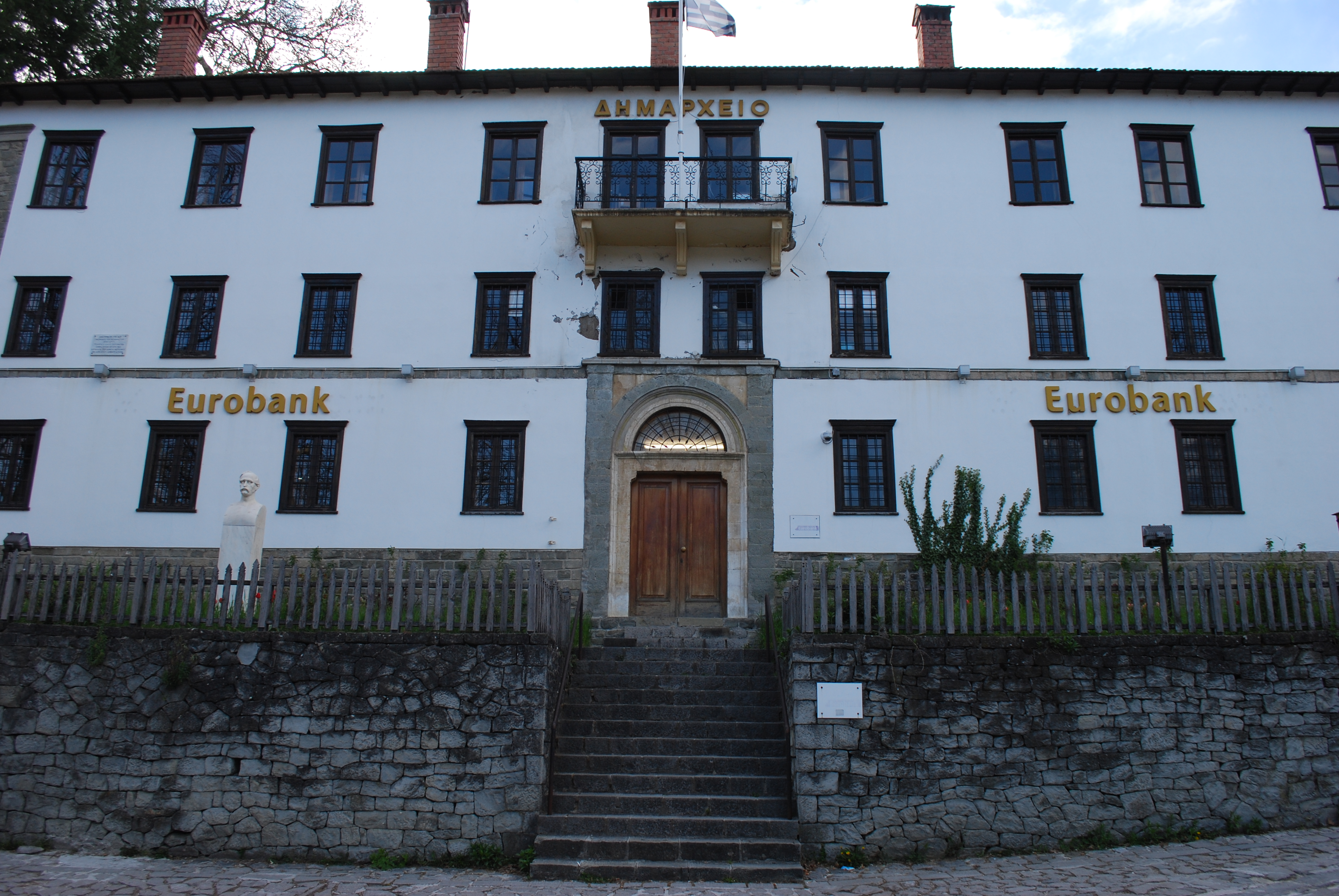
The town hall

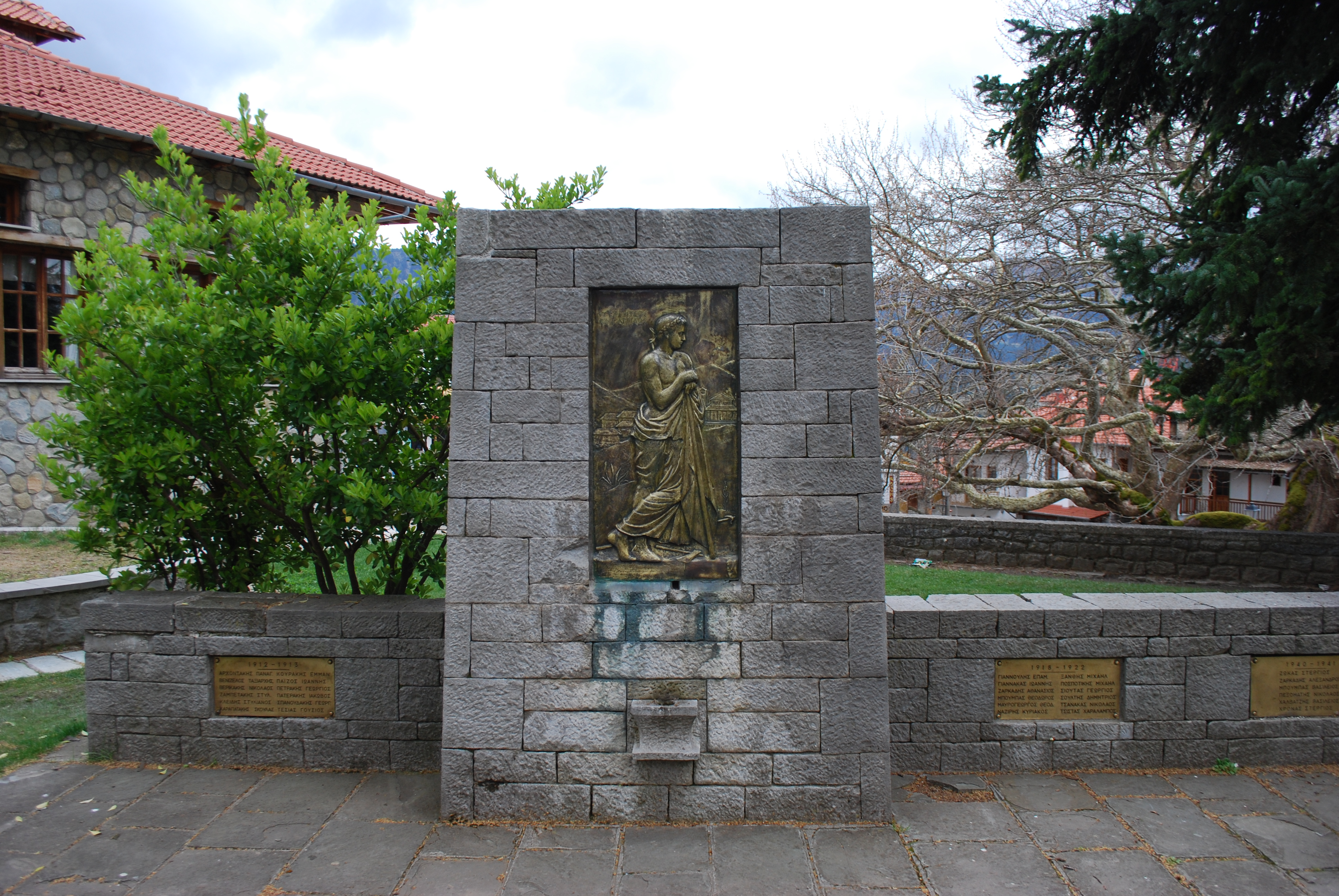
War memorial

== See also ==
- Metsovo lung, endemic mesothelioma

== Sources ==
- Μ.Vasmer, Die Slaven in Griechenland, Leipzic 1970, pp. 41
- K. Oikonomou, Ta oikonymia tou Nomou Ioanninon, Glossologiki Exetasi [Local Names of the Prefecture of Ioannina – Linguistic Approach], publication of the Ioannina Prefecture, Ioannina 2002, pp. 194–199.
- M. Kokolakis, "I tourkiki statistiki tis Epirou sto Salname tou 1895" [Turkish Statistics of Epirus in Salname of 1895], in Plithismoi kai oikismoi tou ellinikou chorou: istorika meletimata [Populations and Settlements of the Greek territories: historic studies], Vasilis Panagiotopoulos, Leonidas Kallivretakis, Dimitris Dimitropoulos, Michalis Kokolakis kai Eudokia Olympiou, publ. Institouto Neoellinikon Ereunon/ Ethniko Idrima Ereunon, 2003, p. 257.
- M. Delibaşi -M. Arikan, Sûret-i Defter-i Sancak-i Tirhala I, Türk Tarih Kurumu, Ankara 2001, pp. 26–27
- G. Weigand, Die Aromunen, Bd. Α΄, J. A. Barth (A. Meiner), Leipzig 1895, p. 149.
- P. Aravantinos, Chronographia tis Epirou [Chronography of Epirus], vol. B', publ. Koultoura, Athens, p. 107 -108
- I. Lampridis, "Malakasiaka", Epirotika Meletimata [Epirote Studies] 5 (1888), publ. 2. Society for Epirote Studies. (EHM), Ioannina 1993, pp. 13–14, 30–37, 40–42, 52–56, 384.
- R.Schlösser, Historische Lautlehre des Aromunischen von Metsovon, Balkan-Archiv, Βd.3, Hamburg 1985, pp. 21–22.
- M. Tritos, "Ta sozomena firmania ton pronomion tou Metsovou" [The surviving firmans about the privileges granted to Metsovo], Minutes of the 1st Conference of Metsovite Studies, Athens 1993, pp. 397–414.
- V. Diamandi, "Meţoviţeanul Floca şi privilegiile obţinute de el", Convorbiri literare (1910), pp. 480–483.
- Th. Dasoulas, "Agrotikes koinonies tou oreinou chorou kata tin othomaniki periodo: o georgikos kosmos tis 'Choras Metzovou'" (18os −19os ai.) [Agrarian society in highland areas during the Ottoman period: farmer's population of the land of Metzovo (18th c. – 19th c.)], publ. EADD (National Archive of PhD Theses, http://hdl.handle.net/10442/hedi/17726), 2009, pp. 127–132, 270-273330-358
- A. Vakalopoulos, Istoria tou Neou Ellinismou [History of Modern Hellenism], vol. B', Thessaloniki 1961, p. 340.
- A. Koukoudis, Oi mitropoleis kai I diaspora ton Vlachon, [Major Cities and Diaspora of the Vlachs], publ. University Studio Press, Thessaloniki 1999, pp. 209–210
- K. Kristallis, Oi Vlachoi tis Pindou [The Vlachs of Pindos], publ. Damianos, Athens 1986 (photographic reprint from the 1915 edition), pp. 21, 49–50
- G. Plataris-Tzimas, Kodikas Diathikon, Meizones kai elassones euergetes tou Metsovou [Log of Wills, Major and Minor Benefactors of Metsovo], Vol. A', pp. 174–207, 285–333, Vol. B', publ. of the Prefecture of Ioannina and the City of Metsovo, Metsovo/Athens 2004, pp. 133, 138, 189–193, 195. Vol. C', pp. 67, 181.
- R. Curzon, "Taksidi stin Epiro to 1834" [Trip to Epirus in 1834], transl. IEA, Epirotiki Estia 90 (1959), p. 774.
- N. Siokis, Endimasia kai koinonia stin Kleisoura tis Kastorias. Meleti vasismeni se photographika tekmiria (teli 19ou-a' miso20ou aiona) [Dress and society in Kleisoura of Kastoria: A study based on photographic evidence] (end of 19th c.-1st half of 20th c.), Thessaloniki 2012, pp. 10–18.
- M. Tritos, I Patriarchiki exarchia Metsovou (1659–1924): I thriskeftiki k' koinoniki tis prosfora [The Patriarchal Exarchate of Metsovo (1659–1924): Its religious and social contribution], publ. IBMT, Ioannina 1991.
- M. Paizi-Apostolopoulou, O thesmos tis Patriarchikis Eksarchias, 14-19os aionas, [The institution of Patriarchical power, 14th – 19th centuries]. National Hellenic Research Foundation, National Hellenic Research Center 54, Athens 1995, pp. 12, 73, 74, 108, 113, 114, 137, 156, 191, 195, 199–204, 221
- F. Oikonomou, I ekklisia tis Epirou: Idrysis, Organosis kai ekseliksis autis [The Church of Epirus: Its founding, organization and development], Athens 1982, pp. 62–63.
- A. Chatzimichali, Oi en to Ellinoscholeio Metsovou didaksantes kai didachthentes [The teachers and students of the Greek School of Metsovo], Ioannina 1940.
- V. Skafidas, "Istoria tou Metsovou" [History of Metsovo], Epirotiki Estia12/135, 138 (1963), pp. 507–509, 657–660, 704–707
- P. Aravantinos, Viographiki Syllogi Logion tis Tourkokratias [Collection of biographies of scholars during the Ottoman rule], publ. Society for Epirote Studies. (EHM), Ioannina 1960, pp. 8, 17, 38,55,62, 63,204,206,208,216.
- I. Maftei, Personalitaţi ieşene I, Omagiu Cercel Nicolae Chiriac (?- 1773), profesor de matematici, Iaşi 1972, pp. 145–146
- G. Plataris – Tzimas, "Anekdota eggrapha pou aforoun tin ekpaideusi sto Metsovo" [Unpublished documents on education in Metsovo] Epirotiko Imerologio 1989, pp. 169–177.
- D Limona.- N.Trandaferescu, Documnte economice din arhiva casei comersiale Ioan St. Stamu ( 714–1875), Direcţia Generală a Arhivelor Statului din Republica Socialistă România, Vol. Ι, ΙΙ, București1983.
- A. Goudas, Vioi Paralliloi ton epi tis anagenniseos tis Ellados diaprepsanton andron [Parallel lives of the men who excelled during the Renaissance, Wealth and Commerce], Vol. D', ek tou typografeiou Ch. N. Philadelpheos, Athens 1871, pp. 148–185.
- G. Plataris, "Oi Tositsides sto Livorno" [The Tositsas family in Livorno], Epirotiko Imerologio, 1984, pp. 199–206.
- G, Ars, "Nea stoicheia gia tin parousia merikon Epirotikon sti Rosia tis arches tou 19ou aiona" [New evidence on the presence of some Epirots in Russia at the beginning of the 19th century], Ioannina-Epirus 19–20 c. History-Society-Culture. Minutes of the 2nd Academic Conference (Ioannina, 2–4 September 1988), Ioannina 1993, pp. 330
- A. Politou, O Ellinismos kai I Neotera Aigyptos, Vol. A', I istoria tou aigyptiotouellinismou apo to 1798 mechri 1927 [Greeks and Modern Egypt, vol. A, the history of Greeks in Egypt from 1798 to 1927], publ. Grammata, Aleksandreia-Athens 1928, pp. 166, 167, 168, 172, 176, 240.
- G. Plataris-Tzimas, Kodikas Diathikon, Meizones kai elassones euergetes tou Metsovou [Log of Wills, Major and Minor Benefactors of Metsovo], Vol. A', B', C', publ. of the Prefecture of Ioannina and the City of Metsovo, Metsovo/Athens 2004,.
- V. Skafidas, "Istoria tou Metsovou" [History of Metsovo], Epirotiki Estia 12/123, 130131 132 135 (1963), pp. 391–399, 107–112, 194–200, 291–300, 502–505
- Th. Dasoulas, Agrotikes koinonies tou oreinou chorou kata tin othomaniki periodo: o georgikos kosmos tis 'Choras Metzovou' (18os − 19os ai.) [Agrarian society in highland areas during the Ottoman period: farmer's population of the land of Metzovo (18th c. – 19th c.)], publ. EADD (National Archive of PhD Theses, http://hdl.handle.net/10442/hedi/17726), 2009, pp. 286– 299
- F. Mpalamoti, Oi vryses tou Metsovou (apo to 18o aiona mehri simera) [The fountains of Metsovo (from the 18th c until today)], publ. Afon Kyriakidi, Thessaloniki 1989.
- G. Plataris-Tzimas, Kodikas Diathikon, Meizones kai elassones euergetes tou Metsovou [Log of Wills, Major and Minor Benefactors of Metsovo], publ. of the Prefecture of Ioannina and the City of Metsovo, Metsovo/Athens 2004, Vol. A', pp. 83–158.
- S. Tositza, Synoptiki pragmateia peri tis ek klirodothmaton kai eteron syneisforon schimatistheisis kai eis diafora meri euriskomenis periousias tis Koinotitos tou Metsovou kai peri tis epofelesteras autis diatheseos [Brief discourse on the donations and other contributions that constitute the assets of the City of Metsovo in various locations and the most beneficial way of managing it], Athens 1868.
- D. Limona – N. Trandaferescu, Documnte economice din arhiva casei comersiale Ioan St. Stamu (714–1875), Direcţia Generală a Arhivelor Statului din Republica Socialistă România, Vol. Ι, București1983, doc. 186, 578, 758, 806, 1083, 2166, 2640, 2641, 3179, 3180, 3321, 3324, 3354.
- G. Plataris, Kodikas Choras Metsovou ton eton 1708–1907 [Land of Metsovou in the years 1708–1907], Athens 1982, doc. 99, 118
- I. Lampridis, "Epirotika Meletimata: Agathoergimata" [Epirote Studies: Charities] I. Lampridis Epirotika Meletimata, Vol. B', pp. 266, 267
- P. Aravantinos, Chronographia tis Epirou [Chronography of Epirus], vol. B', publ. Koultoura, Athens, p. 109
