= Metsovo lung =

Metsovo lung was an epidemic of lung disease resulting from domestic exposure to asbestos in the village of Metsovo in northwest Greece. Most of the inhabitants had previously been exposed to a whitewash derived from local soils containing tremolite asbestos. This caused an epidemic of malignant mesothelioma (MM) that reached an incidence 300 times higher than expected in populations not exposed to asbestos. This was accompanied by pleural calcifications (PCs) in almost half the adult population. Both conditions have declined significantly since the whitewash ceased to be used after 1985.

== Locally high rate of PCs ==
In the early 1980s when the Medical School of Ioannina was established, a group of pneumonologists headed by S.H. Constantopoulos started encountering, almost on a daily basis, X-ray images with extensive PCs in inhabitants of Metsovo. The researchers were told that this was very common to Metsovites and was the result of old tuberculous pleurisy. However, since the picture was not even remotely similar to calcified pleurisy from previous tuberculosis, they began to investigate the precise frequency of PCs, whether their abnormal incidence was in fact confined to Metsovites, and their true cause.

In a field study in Metsovo and other areas around Ioannina, it was confirmed that PCs were very common among Metsovites, around 50% of adult population, increasing to more than 80% in those above 70; and that they were seen only in Metsovo and three neighbouring villages.

== Relation to asbestos ==
The relation to asbestos was identified when, a few months later, two consecutive patients appeared with massive pleural effusions that proved to be malignant mesothelioma. These were only the first of a series of mesotheliomas; seven in five years (1981–1985). This rate is roughly 300-times higher than expected in a non-asbestos exposed community. The combination of PCs and MM can only be attributed to asbestos exposure.

Transbronchial lung biopsies from Metsovites with extensive PCs were then obtained and sent to Mount Sinai Hospital in New York (doctors A. Langer and R. Nolan). Their analysis revealed long thin tremolite asbestos fibers in most biopsies in spite of their minuscule size.

== Source of asbestos ==
The possibility of this exposure being occupational seemed very unlikely, as there are no asbestos mines or factories near Metsovo. The nearest such mine (active until 1990) is located near Kozani, a city 150 miles east of Metsovo. Guided by previous research by Izzettin Baris dealing with not-occupational (domestic) exposure of vast areas in Anatolia (Turkey) from erionite and tremolite, the researchers arranged a meeting with Metsovites where they were told that practically all households in Metsovo were using soil from nearby hills (white soil is louto in the local dialect) for whitewashing. The material was applied more often on walls around fireplaces, because this kept the walls white, unsoiled from the fire. (Note: Asbestos is called αμίαντος in Greek (amiante in French) and means something that is not soiled (e.g. by fire).) This whitewash was used by everybody until 1940-1950 and gradually abandoned, so that in 1980 it was used by only 15% of the households and by 1985 it was completely abandoned.

Samples of the whitewash were sent to Mount Sinai Hospital, and proved to contain fibers of tremolite asbestos identical to the material previously obtained from the lungs of Metsovites.

Louto was obtained by digging soil from hills 5–10 km from Metsovo within the "Pindos serpentine zone". It was shaped like a ball, crushed into powder, boiled and applied to the walls. Crushing the ball released more than 200 fibers/ml of air, when the accepted limits for occupational exposure are lower than one fiber/ml. There were minuscule fiber concentrations during the rest of the process, while no fibers were detected in the ambient atmosphere of Metsovo.

There has never been any commercial use of the soil within the Pindos serpentine zone other than that mentioned (the asbestos mine in Kozani was functioning until the early 1990s), but there have been several areas where soil had been used by small populations in the remote past for various domestic uses, as in Metsovo. In at least two of them there have been small "epidemics" of mesothelioma. The use of this soil has been abandoned for at least 50–60 years. Outside Greece and Turkey, similar use with similar results has been reported in other areas around the Mediterranean Sea, but also as far as New Caledonia in the Pacific Ocean.

== Projected course ==
Having found the most likely cause of PCs and mesotheliomas in Metsovo and the temporal course of its use, from 1940 to 1950 when it was used by all households until 1980-1985 when it was abandoned, it was possible to project the future course of this epidemic. First, other sources of asbestos exposure, after the abandonment of louto, had to be excluded. Two clinical means of measuring exposure were used for this purpose. Both had been positive in practically all exposed Metsovites during the peak of louto use: chest computed tomography (CT) and bronchoalveolar lavage (BAL). A study of Metsovites between the ages of 30 and 50 (Note: They had to be over 30, since this is the time needed for PCs to become apparent radiologically. They also had to be below 50, since older individuals born when louto was still used extensively could have been exposed to it, (even if they claimed that they were not using it at home), from the homes of friends and relatives.) confirmed that louto was the only source of asbestos exposure in Metsovo, as none of the subjects examined had PCs or asbestos fibers.

Finally, after thirty years of research it was possible to examine the dynamics of the frequency of PCs among Metsovites between 1980 and 2010. As expected, their frequency was found to be decreasing and the age when PCs are first seen was increasing. In regard to mesothelioma, after the first study in the 1980s, two studies have shown that the incidence of mesothelioma is also dropping. However, the end of this epidemic cannot be predicted safely. Mesotheliomas appear usually 30–50 years after exposure but this can be prolonged, very rarely, to 70 years. Thus, since the use of louto stopped between 1980 and 1985, a decreasing incidence of mesothelioma may be expected until 2020-2030 and possibly 2040.
