= Derveni (Metsovo) =

In various Turkish firmans, the area of Metsovo is referred to as derbent (Greek: derveni, "passage") and its residents as derbendcis, meaning guards of the passage. Such passages (pl. dervenia) constituted key aspects of the land and road organization system of the Ottoman state. Often, the responsibility for their security and maintenance was undertaken by the residents of a town or area, who in exchange enjoyed reduced taxation.

== The passages ==
The passages of Metsovo were of vital importance for the cohesion of the Ottoman state in this part of the Balkans, as well as for transportation/communication and trade purposes. Especially in the wintertime, the extreme weather conditions at the higher altitudes made it almost impossible to go through, stopping both ordinary travelers and entire military units alike and putting their lives at risk.

== The Sultan’s decree ==
A relevant Sultan firman of the time reads: “Because the people of Metsovo reside in Chora, through which many travelers pass at all times of the year, and in the wintertime they help travelers go through the passages under heavy snow, risking to die from the freezing cold, by wrapping cloths around the legs of the horses and carrying the people on their shoulders, while in the summertime they protect and safeguard the travelers against bandits; for these reasons special privileges and rights are established and ordered for them …”

== The services ==
The services provided by the people of Metsovo as derbentzis include not only the guarding of the passages but also the provision of services to travelers. Besides maintaining an armed band of guards paid by community funds, a network of inns is established along the passages that cross the area. The management and smooth operation of the inns was one of the major issues occupying local authorities.

== Sources ==
- H. Inalcik, I othomaniki autokratoria, I klassiki epochi, 1300-1600 [The Ottoman Empire: The classical age 1330-1600], transl. M Kokolakis, publ. Aleksandreia, Athens, first ed. 1995, pp. 256–257.
- Η. Inalcik, The Οttoman Empire: Conquest, Organisation and Economy (Collected studies, ed. Variorum Reprints) London 1978, pp. 103–129.
- Β. Cvetkova, Villes et porters Balcaniques au XVe-XVIe siècles, Librarie Orientaliste, P. Geuther, Paris 1971, p. 11.
- I Lampridis, “Politiki exartisis kai dioikisis Malakasiou” [Political Dependence and Administration of Malakasion], Parnassos 10 (1886), p. 384.
- V. Rokou, Oreines koinonies kata tin periodo ths Othomanikis kiriarchias sta Valkania [Mountain communities during the time of the Ottoman rule in the Balkans], publ. Erodios, Thessaloniki 2007, pp. 57–62.
- W. M. Leake, Travels in northern Greece, Vol. I, Α. Μ. Ηakkert-Publisher, (photographic reprint Amsterdam 1967), p. 412.
- F. S. N. Douglas, An essay on certain points of resemblance between the ancient and modern Greeks, London 1813, p. 11.
- D. Urquhart, 1839, The Spirit of the East, Vol. 2, H. Colbum, London2, pp. 263–264.
- L. Vranousis, “Istorika tou Metsovou kai tis giro periochis”, (History of Metsovon and the greater area]Minutes of 2nd Conference of Metsovite Studies (Metsovo, 9–11 September 1994), Athens 1997, p. 26.
- Th. Dasoulas, Agrotikes koinonies tou oreinou chorou kata tin othomaniki periodo: o georgikos kosmos tis “Choras Metzovou” (18os -19os ai.) [Agrarian society in highland areas during the Ottoman period: farmer's population of the land of Metzovo (18th c. - 19th c.)], publ. EADD (National Archive of PhD Theses, http://hdl.handle.net/10442/hedi/17726), 2009, pp. 127–132.
