= Anastasius =

Anastasius (Latinized) or Anastasios (Greek: Αναστάσιος, romanized: Anastasios) is a masculine given name of Greek origin derived from the Greek word ἀνάστασις (anastasis) meaning "resurrection". Its female form is Anastasia (Greek: Αναστασία). A diminutive form of Anastasios is Tassos (Greek: Τάσσος) or Tasos (Greek: Τάσος).

== People ==
=== Byzantine emperors ===
- Anastasius I Dicorus, reign 491–518
- Anastasius II (emperor) (died 719), born Artemius, reign 713–715

=== Popes ===
- Pope Anastasius I, papacy 399–401
- Pope Anastasius II, papacy 496–498
- Pope Anastasius III, papacy 911–913
- Pope Anastasius IV, papacy 1153–1154

=== Other Christian saints and clergy ===
- Saint Anastasius, martyr under Nero
- Saint Anastasius the Fuller (died 304), martyr and patron saint of fullers and weavers
- Saint Anastasius of Lleida (c. 263–11 May 305)
- Anastasius of Jerusalem, patriarch of the Church of Jerusalem from 458 to 478
- Anastasius of Suppentonia (died 570), abbot
- Pope Anastasius of Alexandria, Coptic Orthodox Pope of Alexandria (605–616)
- Anastasius of Antioch (disambiguation)
- Saint Anastasius of Persia (died 628), Persian martyr
- Saint Anastasius of Pavia (died 680), bishop of Pavia
- Anastasius of Armenia, successor of Nerses III the Builder as Catholicos of Armenia from 661 to 667
- Saint Anastasius Sinaita (fl. 7th century), theologian, father of the Eastern Orthodox Church, monk, priest, and abbot of the monastery at Mt. Sinai
- Anastasius (abbot of Euthymius) (fl. 8th century)
- Patriarch Anastasius of Constantinople, Patriarch of Constantinople (730–754)
- Anastasius Bibliothecarius (c. 810–878), librarian of the Church of Rome, scholar and statesman, sometimes identified as an Antipope
- Astrik or Saint Anastasius of Pannonhalma, ambassador of Stephen I of Hungary
- Anastasius of S. Clemente, Cardinal-priest of the title of San Clemente, c. 1102–c. 1125
- Anastasius Germonius (1551–1627), Archbishop of Tarantaise and canon lawyer
- Anastasius Crimca (c. 1550–1629), Moldavian Eastern Orthodox clergyman, calligrapher, illuminator and writer
- Anastasius the Melodist (hymnographer), believed to be a name of three or more melodists, one of whom is believed to have been a contemporary of Rhomanos
- Anastasius Hartmann (1803–1886), Capuchin, missionary in India and Titular Bishop and Vicar Apostolic of Patna and Bombay
- Anastasius Gribanovsky (1873–1965), hierarch of the Russian Orthodox Church and First Hierarch of the Russian Orthodox Church Outside Russia
- Anastasios (1929–2025), Greek Orthodox Archbishop of Tirana, Durrës and All Albania

=== Politicians and military ===
- Anastasios Andreou (1877–1947), Cypriot athlete and volunteer in the Greek army for the Greco-Turkish war of 1897
- Anastasios Balkos (1916–1995), Greek politician
- Anastasios Charalambis (1862–1949), Greek officer and interim Prime Minister of Greece
- Anastasios Chatzivasileiou (born 1981), Greek politician
- Anastasios Christopoulos (1805–1854), Greek lawyer and revolutionary of the Greek War of Independence
- Anastasios Dalipis (1896–1949), Greek Army officer and politician
- Anastasius Fétul (1816–1886), Moldavian and Romanian physician, naturalist, philanthropist and political figure
- Anastasios Giannitsis (born 1944), Greek politician, academic and business executive
- Anastasios Karatasos (1764–1830), Greek military commander during the Greek War of Independence
- Anastasios Kourakis (1948–2021), Greek politician, pediatrician and geneticist
- Anastasios Londos (1791–1856), Greek politician and senator
- Anastasios Manakis (c. 1790–1864), Greek revolutionary of the Greek War of Independence
- Anastasios Mavromichalis (1798–1870), Greek revolutionary of the Greek War of Independence and politician
- Anastasios Mitropoulos (born 1957), Greek footballer and politician
- Anastasios Nerantzis (1944–2021), Greek politician
- Anastasios Papaligouras (born 1948), Greek politician
- Anastasios Papoulas (1857–1935), Greek general during the Greco-Turkish War of 1919–1922
- Anastasios Peponis (1924–2011), Greek politician
- Anastasios Pichion (1836–1913), Greek educator and revolutionary of the Macedonian Struggle
- Anastasios Polyzoidis (1802–1873), Greek politician and judicial official
- Anastasios Tsamados (1774–1825), Greek admiral of the Greek War of Independence
- Anastasios Voulgaris (died 1839), Bulgarian-born Greek revolutionary during the Greek War of independence

=== Sports ===
- Anastasios Anastasopoulos (1915–1981), Greek chess player
- Anastasios Andreou (1877–1947), Greek Cypriot athlete and soldier in the Greco-Turkish war of 1897
- Anastasios Antonakis (born 1992), Greek basketball player
- Anastasios Avlonitis (born 1990), Greek footballer
- Anastasios Bakasetas (born 1993), Greek footballer
- Anastasios Bavelas (born 1968), Greek tennis player
- Anastasios Bountouris (born 1955), Greek Olympic medalist in sailing
- Anastasios Chatzigiovanis (born 1997), Greek footballer
- Anastasios Christofileas (born 1988), Greek footballer
- Anastasios Dentsas (born 1982), Greek footballer and coach
- Anastasios Dimas (born 1988), Greek basketball player
- Anastasios Dimitriadis (born 1997), Greek footballer
- Anastasios Donis (born 1996), Greek footballer
- Anastasios Douvikas (born 1999), Greek footballer
- Anastasios Gavrilis (born 1952), Greek sailor
- Anastasios Gousis (born 1979), Greek sprinter
- Anastasios Kakos (born 1970), Greek football referee
- Anastasios Kantoutsis (born 1994), Greek footballer
- Anastasios Karagiozis (born 1997), Greek footballer
- Anastasios Karakoutsis (born 1983), Greek footballer
- Anastasios Karamanos (born 1990), Greek footballer
- Anastasios Katsabis (born 1973), Greek footballer
- Anastasios Kissas (born 1988), Cypriot footballer
- Anastasios Kritikos (footballer, born 1914), Greek footballer
- Anastasios Kritikos (footballer, born 1995), Greek footballer
- Anastasios Kyriakos (born 1978), Greek footballer
- Anastasios Lagos (born 1992) Greek footballer
- Anastasios Lordos (born 1949), Cypriot sport shooter
- Anastasios Markopoulos (born 1949), Greek basketball player and coach
- Anastasios Meletidis (born 1999), Greek footballer
- Anastasios Metaxas (1862–1937), Greek sport shooter and architect
- Anastasios Mitropoulos (born 1957), Greek footballer and politician
- Anastasios Mousidis (1934–2010), Greek wrestler
- Anastasios Pantos (born 1976), Greek footballer
- Anastasios Papachristos (born 1993), Greek footballer
- Anastasios Papakonstantinou (born 1963), Greek bobsledder
- Anastasios Papanastasiou (born 1964), Greek water polo player
- Anastasios Papazoglou (born 1988), Greek footballer
- Anastasios Pastos (born 1978), Greek footballer
- Anastasios Rousakis (born 1985), Greek footballer
- Anastasios Salonidis (born 1979), Greek footballer
- Anastasios Sapountzis (born 2002), Greek footballer
- Anastasios Schizas (born 1977), Greek water polo player
- Anastasios Sidiropoulos (born 1979), Greek football referee
- Anastasios Spyropoulos (born 1995), Greek basketball player
- Anastasios Theodorakis (1902-unknown), Greek water polo player
- Anastasios Triantafyllou (born 1987), Greek weightlifter
- Anastasios Triantafyllou (footballer) (born 1979), Greek footballer
- Anastasios Tselios (born 2002), Greek footballer
- Anastasios Tsikaris (born 1966), Greek water polo player
- Anastasios Tsiou, Greek Paralympian athlete
- Anastasios Tsokanis (born 1991), Greek footballer
- Anastasios Tsoumagas (born 1991), Greek footballer
- Anastasios Vasiliadis (born 1974), Greek tennis player
- Anastasios Vatistas (born 1945), Greek sailor
- Anastasios Venetis (born 1980), Greek footballer
- Anastasios Vogiatzis (born 1936), Greek sailor
- Anastasios Zarkadas (born 1994), Greek footballer

=== Other people named Anastasius ===
- Anastasius the jurist (fl. 5th or 6th century), Roman jurist
- Anastasius (consul 517) (fl. 6th century), Byzantine statesman
- Anastasius (consul 518) (fl. 6th century), Byzantine statesman
- Anastasius of Samaria (fl. 6th century), Byzantine official
- Anastasius Fétul (1816–1886), Moldavian and Romanian physician, naturalist, philanthropist and political figure
- Anastasius Nordenholz (1862–1953), German-Argentine author

=== Other people named Anastasios ===
- Anastasios Bakirtzis (born 1956), Greek electrical and computer engineer
- Anastasios Christomanos (1841–1906), Greek chemist
- Anastasios Christodoulou (1932–2002), Greek Cypriot university administrator
- Anastasios Isaac (1972–1996), Greek Cypriot refugee murdered during a demonstration
- Anastasios John Kanellopoulos, Greek-American eye surgeon
- Anastasios Koulouriotis (1822–1887), Arvanite Greek writer
- Anastasios Kyriakides (born 1946), Greek-American businessman
- Anastasios George Leventis (1902–1975), Greek Cypriot businessman
- Anastasios Melis, Greek-American biologist
- Anastasios Metaxas (1862–1937), Greek architect and sport shooter
- Anastasios Michail (c. 1675–1722), Greek scholar
- Anastasios Nyfadopoulos (born 1992), Greek artist
- Anastasios Orlandos (1887–1979), Greek archeologist and architect
- Anastasios Rouvas (born 1972), Greek singer, actor and businessman
- Anastasios Soulis (born 1987), Swedish actor
- Anastasios Tagis (1839–1900), Greek scholar and philological teacher
- Anastasios Tsonis, Greek-American atmospheric scientist
- Anastasios Venetsanopoulos (1941–2014), Greek-Canadian engineer

=== Pseudonym ===
- Anton Alexander Graf von Auersperg (1806–1876), Austrian poet who wrote under the pseudonym of Anastasius Grün

== See also ==
- Anastasia
- Anastasio
- Anastacia (given name)
- Anastacio (name)
