= List of jurists =

The following lists are of prominent jurists, including judges, listed in alphabetical order by jurisdiction.

== Premodern ==
=== Ancient Near East ===
- Ur-Nammu
- Hammurabi

=== Ancient Egypt ===
- Bakenranef

=== Ancient Israel ===
- Solomon

=== Ancient India ===
- Manu
- Chanakya

=== Ancient Greece ===
- Draco
- Bias of Priene
- Lycurgus
- Lysias
- Solon
- Zaleucus
- Charondas
- Demonax
- Diagoras of Melos

=== Ancient Rome ===
- Numa Pompilius
- Gaius Terentilius Harsa
- Marcus Tullius Cicero
- Gaius
- Herennius Modestinus
- Aemilius Papinianus
- Paulus
- Domitius Ulpianus
- Pamphilus of Caesarea
- Sozomen

=== Byzantine Empire ===
- Enantiophanes
- Tribonian
- Dorotheus
- Theophilus Antecessor
- Michael Choumnos
- Theodore of Dekapolis
- Anastasius

=== Islamic ===
- Muhammad
- Abu Hanifa
- Malik ibn Anas
- Al-Shafi‘i
- Ahmad ibn Hanbal
- Al-Ghazali
- Ibn Taymiyyah
- Ibn Khaldun

=== Medieval Roman Law ===
- Glossators:
  - Irnerius
  - Four Doctors of Bologna:
    - Bulgarus
    - Martinus Gosia
    - Jacobus de Boragine
    - Hugo de Porta Ravennate
  - Placentinus
  - Azo of Bologna
  - Accursius
  - Franciscus Accursius
  - Joannes Bassianus
  - Tancred of Bologna
  - Bernard of Botone
- Cino da Pistoia
- Bartolus de Saxoferrato
- Baldus de Ubaldis
- Matteo D'Afflitto

=== Canon law ===
- Saint Photios the Great
- Gratian (the Monk)
- John Scholasticus
- John Gascoigne
- Johann Georg Reiffenstuel
- Hostiensis
- Raymond of Penyafort

== Modern jurists by country ==
=== Argentina ===
- Luis Moreno Ocampo
- Eugenio Raul Zaffaroni

=== Australia ===
- Sir Edmund Barton (judge)
- Sir Garfield Barwick (judge)
- Sir Gerard Brennan (judge)
- Julian Burnside (Queen's Counsel)
- Sir William Deane (judge, Governor-General)
- Sir Owen Dixon (judge)
- Dr H.V. Evatt (judge, politician)
- Robert French (judge)
- Mary Gaudron (judge)
- Sir Harry Gibbs (judge)
- Murray Gleeson (judge)
- Sir Samuel Griffith (judge)
- H.B. Higgins (judge)
- Sir Isaac Isaacs (judge, Governor-General)
- David Ipp (judge)
- Michael Kirby (judge)
- Sir Adrian Knox (judge)
- Sir Anthony Mason (judge)
- Lionel Murphy (judge)
- Richard O'Connor (judge)
- Geoffrey Robertson (Queen's Counsel)
- Sir Ninian Stephen (judge)
- Julius Stone
- Sir Ronald Wilson (judge)

=== Austria ===
- Ludwig Adamovich Sr., former president of the Austrian Constitutional Court
- Ludwig Adamovich Jr., former president of the Austrian Constitutional Court
- Walter Antoniolli, former president of the Austrian Constitutional Court
- Eugen Ehrlich, legal sociologist
- Hans Kelsen, Constitutional theorist, draftsman of the Austrian constitution and creator of the Pure Theory of Law
- Karl Korinek, former president of the Austrian Constitutional Court
- Franz von Zeiller, draftsman of the final version of the Austrian Civil Code of 1811

=== Bangladesh ===
- A. K. Fazlul Huq
- Radhabinod Pal
- Syed Mahbub Murshed
- Mustafa Kamal
- Azizul Haque
- Kamal Hossain
- Khatun Sapnara

=== Brazil ===
- Pimenta Bueno
- Eusébio de Queirós
- Zacarias de Góis e Vasconcelos
- Cândido Mendes de Almeida
- Viscount of Rio Branco
- Ernesto Carneiro Ribeiro
- Rui Barbosa
- Clóvis Beviláqua
- Baron of Rio Branco
- Joaquim Nabuco
- Heráclito Fontoura Sobral Pinto
- Hermes Lima
- Rosa Weber
- San Tiago Dantas
- Evandro Lins e Silva
- Victor Nunes Leal
- Alfredo Buzaid
- Paulo Brossard
- Raymundo Faoro
- Joaquim Barbosa
- Walter Moraes
- Marco Aurélio Mello
- Celso Lafer
- Celso de Mello
- Francisco Cavalcanti Pontes de Miranda
- Miguel Reale
- Augusto Teixeira de Freitas

=== Brunei ===
- Geoffrey Briggs

=== Canada ===
- Rosalie Abella
- Louise Arbour
- Matthew Baillie Begbie
- Denise Bellamy
- William Hume Blake
- Louise Charron
- Henry Pering Pellew Crease
- Brian Dickson
- John Gomery
- Peter Hogg
- Louis-Hippolyte Lafontaine
- Antonio Lamer
- Bora Laskin
- John McClung
- Beverley McLachlin, first female Chief Justice of Canada (2000–2017)
- Roy McMurtry
- Louis-Philippe Pigeon
- F. R. Scott, also a poet (Francis Reginald Scott, or Frank Scott)
- Robert Taschereau
- Stephen Waddams

=== Colombia ===
- Carlos Medellín Forero
- Carlos Lemos Simmonds

=== Cyprus ===
- Solon Nikitas
- Alecos Markides

=== Czechoslovakia ===
- Emil Hácha
- František Ladislav Rieger

=== Czech Republic ===
- Petra Buzková
- Otakar Motejl
- Petr Pithart
- Cyril Svoboda

=== Denmark ===
- Alf Ross
- Anders Sandøe Ørsted

=== England & Wales ===
- John Selden
- Sir Francis Bacon
- Sir Redmond Barry, QC
- Sir William Blackstone
- Lord Browne-Wilkinson
- Sir Edward Coke
- Lord Denning
- Albert Venn Dicey
- Sir Matthew Hale
- Lord Hutton
- Lord Goff of Chieveley
- Thomas More
- Lord Morris of Borth-y-Gest
- Lord Scarman
- Hartley Shawcross
- Lord Templeman
- Lord Woolf
- Lord Mansfield
- Sir Ronald Waterhouse, QC
- H. L. A. Hart

=== France ===
- Antoine Dadin de Hauteserre
- Charles Aubry
- Jean-Louis Bruguière, investigative magistrate specialized on terrorism cases
- Jean Jacques Régis de Cambacérès, main author of the Napoleonic Code
- Guy Canivet, first president of the Court of Cassation
- Renaud Denoix de Saint Marc, vice-president of the Conseil d'État
- Jean-Jacques Gaspard Foelix (1791–1853) founder of the science of comparative law in France.
- Georges Gurvitch
- Claude Jorda
- Edouard de Laboulaye
- Pierre Mazeaud, president of the Constitutional Council of France
- Jean-Étienne-Marie Portalis
- Jean-Paul Beraudo
- Joseph Dallois
- Jean-François Fournel

=== Germany ===
- Robert Alexy (1945–2026)
- Claus-Wilhelm Canaris
- Philipp Heck, representative of sociological jurisprudence (Interessenjurisprudenz)
- Roman Herzog, President of the German Constitutional Court and later President of Germany
- es: Günther Jakobs
- Rudolf von Jhering, founder of sociological jurisprudence (Interessenjurisprudenz)
- Hermann Kantorowicz, proponent of the Free Law School (Freirechtslehre)
- Burkard Wilhelm Leist (1819–1906)
- Richard Rosendorff (fl. 1875–1941)
- Claus Roxin, founder of the "Tatherrschaftslehre"
- Friedrich Carl von Savigny, 19th century legal scholar of the historical school
- Carl Schmitt, legal theorist
- Bernhard Windscheid, leading drafter of the BGB
- Reinhold Zippelius, German representative of critical rationalism in jurisprudence

=== Hong Kong ===
- Kemal Bokhary (judge)
- Charles Ching (judge)
- Andrew Li (judge)
- Henry Litton (judge)
- Charles Ching
- Denys Roberts
- Robert Ribeiro
- George Phillippo
- Yang Ti-liang
- Patrick Yu

=== India ===
- Dr. B. R. Ambedkar
- Mahatma Gandhi
- C. Rajagopalachari
- Chittaranjan Das
- Rajendra Prasad
- B. N. Rau
- Subodh Markandeya
- K. K. Mathew
- Flavia Agnes
- Upendra Baxi
- P. B. Gajendragadkar
- Justice V.R Krishna Iyer
- Ram Jethmalani
- Fali S. Nariman
- N. R. Madhava Menon
- Nanabhoy Palkhivala
- Justice P. N. Bhagwati
- B.S. Chimni
- M.P. Singh
- K N Chandrasekharan Pillai
- Justice Dhananjaya Y. Chandrachud
- Justice Y. V. Chandrachud
- Radhabinod Pal
- Hari Singh Gour
- B. N. Srikrishna
- Shamnad Basheer
- M. C. Setalvad
- Mandagadde Rama Jois
- Dr. Faizan Mustafa
- Adish C. Aggarwala

=== Iran ===
- Shirin Ebadi

=== Ireland ===
- William Binchy (Regius Professor of Laws in Trinity College, Dublin)
- Declan Costello (former President of the High Court and Attorney-General)
- Susan Denham (Judge of the Supreme Court)
- Thomas Finlay (former Chief Justice)
- Dermot Gleeson (Senior Counsel and former Attorney-General)
- Adrian Hardiman (Judge of the Supreme Court)
- Gerard Hogan (Senior Counsel, Lecturer in Trinity College, Dublin, co-editor of the later editions of "J.M. Kelly: The Irish Constitution")
- Ronan Keane (former Chief Justice)
- John M. Kelly (late Attorney-General and author of the commentary "The Irish Constitution")
- Hugh Kennedy (late Chief Justice and Attorney-General)
- John L. Murray (Chief Justice and former Attorney-General)
- Cearbhall Ó Dálaigh (late Chief Justice, Attorney-General and President of Ireland)
- Thomas O'Higgins (late Chief Justice)
- Mary Robinson (former Barrister, Professor and later President of Ireland)

=== Israel ===
- Miriam Ben-Porat
- Itzhak Nener
- Gabriela Shalev

=== Italy ===
- Thomas Aquinas
- Alberico Gentili
- Niccolò Machiavelli
- Giambattista Vico
- Cesare Beccaria
- Francesco Mario Pagano
- Benedetto Marcello
- Francesco Carrara
- Gaetano Filangieri
- Piero Calamandrei
- Francesco Carnelutti
- Pietro della Vigna
- Vincenzo Caianiello
- Francesco Parisi
- Luigi Ferrari Bravo
- Dionisio Anzilotti
- Bettina d'Andrea
- Riccardo Petroni
- Gino Giugni
- Giovanni Conso
- Enrico De Nicola
- Leopoldo Elia
- Marco Biagi
- Giovanni Maria Flick
- Giuliano Vassalli
- Gustavo Zagrebelsky

=== Lebanon ===
- Choucri Cardahi
- Émile Tyan

=== Macau ===
- Sam Hou Fai – Presidente
- Lai Kin Hong – Presidente
- Tam Hio Wa – Presidente dos Tribunais de Primeira Instancia
- Alice Leonor das Neves Costa – Presidente de tribunal colectivo
- Lau Cheok Va – Presidente

=== Morocco ===
- Amina, bint al-Hajj ʿAbd al-Latif (fl.1802–1812), scribe and scholar

=== The Netherlands ===
- Hugo Grotius
- Gerhard Diephuis
- Tobias Asser, played major role in the formation of the Permanent Court of Arbitration, joint recipient of the 1911 Nobel Prize for Peace
- Johannes Bob van Benthem, first president of the European Patent Office
- Rudolph Cleveringa, professor at Leiden University who publicly protested against the removal of Jewish colleagues from the university by the German occupier
- Pieter Kooijmans, judge on the International Court of Justice
- Henry G. Schermers, professor at Leiden University, founder of Mordenate College and member of the European Commission for Human Rights
- Bert Röling, judge on the International Military Tribunal for the Far East in Tokyo

=== Pakistan ===
- Muhammad Iqbal
- Abul A'la Maududi
- Rashid Rehman
- Ali Ahmad Kurd
- Abdul Hafiz Pirzada
- Agha Rafiq Ahmed Khan
- Shahid Hamid
- S.M. Zafar
- Mian Tufail Mohammad
- Ashtar Ausaf Ali
- Liaquat Ali Khan
- Ghulam Farooq Awan
- Hina Jilani
- Asma Jahangir
- Khurshid Mahmud Kasuri
- Sadiq Khan
- Wasim Sajjad

=== Philippines ===
- Ricardo C. Puno

=== Poland ===
- Aleksandra Kosiorek

=== Portugal ===
- Medieval Period:
  - João Das Regras
- Modern Period:
  - Duarte Nunes de Leão
  - Sebastião José de Carvalho e Melo
  - Jorge de Cabedo
  - Pedro Barbosa
  - Belchior Febos
- Liberalism/Constitucional Monarchy:
  - José Homem Correia Teles
  - Mouzinho da Silveira
  - António Luís de Seabra
  - António Bernardo de Costa Cabral
  - João Franco
  - Manuel da Silva Passos
  - José António de Miranda Pereira de Meneses
  - Henrique O'Neill
  - Guerra Junqueiro
- Contemporary Period:
  - Manuel de Arriaga
  - Ana Maria Guerra Martins
  - Januário Lourenço
  - José Manuel Hespanha
  - José Manuel Durão Barroso
  - Jorge Miranda
  - José Hermano Saraiva
  - José Dias Ferreira
  - Isabel de Magalhães Colaço
  - Fernando Machado Soares
  - António Menezes Cordeiro
  - Miguel Sousa Tavares
  - Paula Escarameia
  - Marcelo Rebelo de Sousa
  - Maria Lúcia Amaral
  - Manuel Lobo Antunes

=== Scotland ===
- Colin Boyd, Lord Advocate
- Lord Cullen of Whitekirk, Lord President of the Court of Session of Scotland
- Lord Brian Gill, Lord Justice Clerk of Scotland
- Sir Neil MacCormick
- Lord Rodger of Earlsferry
- Lord Donald MacArthur Ross

=== Serbia ===
- Slobodan Jovanović
- Milovan Milovanović
- Jovan Sterija Popović
- Smilja Avramov
- Mirko Vasiljević
- Miodrag Majić

=== Russia (Russian Empire - USSR - Russian Federation) ===
- Andrey Vyshinsky
- Evgeny Pashukanis
- Major-General Iola Nikitchenko
- Pavel Yudin
- Ivan Jakovlevich Fojnickij

=== Spain ===
- Ramón Llàtzer de Dou de Bassols
- Gloria Begué Cantón
- Fèlix Maria Falguera
- Eduardo Garcia de Enterria y Martinez-Carande
- Baltasar Garzón
- Juan Sempere y Guarinos

=== Syria ===
- Issam al-Khalif, President of the Supreme Constitutional Court

=== South Africa ===
- Mandisa Maya Chief Justice of the Republic of South Africa
- Raymond Zondo Former Chief Justice of the Republic of South Africa
- Mogoeng Mogoeng Former Chief Justice of the Republic of South Africa
- Dikgang Moseneke Former Deputy Chief Justice of the Republic of South Africa
- Mbuyiseli Madlanga Acting Deputy Chief Justice of the Republic of South Africa
- Zukisa Tshiqi Justice in the Constitutional Court of the Republic of South Africa
- Tembeka Ngcukaitobi Senior Counsel
- Dali Mpofu Senior Counsel

=== Sri Lanka ===
- Christopher Weeramantry
- Mark Fernando
- Neelan Tiruchelvam
- Deepika Udagama

=== Switzerland ===
- Eugen Huber, University of Berne, drafter of the Zivilgesetzbuch, the Swiss Civil Code.
- Walter Kälin

=== United States ===
- Robert Araujo, S.J. International Law Professor at Loyola University Chicago School of Law
- Randy Barnett (born 1952), Law Professor at Georgetown University Law Center
- Paul Butler (professor) (born 1961) is an American lawyer, former prosecutor, and current Law Professor Georgetown University Law Center
- William Brennan (1906–1997), Associate Justice, Supreme Court of the United States
- Louis Brandeis (1856–1941), Associate Justice, Supreme Court of the United States
- Warren E. Burger (1907–1995), Chief Justice of the United States
- Mike Cicconetti (born 1951), judge, Lake County, Ohio
- Benjamin N. Cardozo (1870–1938), Associate Justice, Supreme Court of the United States
- Felix Frankfurter (1882–1965), Associate Justice, Supreme Court of the United States
- Henry Friendly (1903–1986), judge, United States Court of Appeals for the Second Circuit
- John Bannister Gibson (1780-1853), Chief Justice of the Supreme Court of Pennsylvania
- Ruth Bader Ginsburg (1933–2020), Associate Justice, Supreme Court of the United States
- Learned Hand (1872–1961), judge, United States Court of Appeals for the Second Circuit
- Oliver Wendell Holmes Jr. (1841–1935), Associate Justice, Supreme Court of the United States
- John Marshall Harlan (1833–1911), Associate Justice, Supreme Court of the United States
- John Jay (1745–1829), Chief Justice of the United States
- Anthony Kennedy (born 1936), Associate Justice, Supreme Court of the United States
- Alex Kozinski (born 1950), judge, United States Court of Appeals for the Ninth Circuit
- Hans A. Linde (1924–2020), justice, Oregon Supreme Court
- John Marshall (1755–1835), Chief Justice of the United States
- Thurgood Marshall (1908–1993), Associate Justice, Supreme Court of the United States
- Frank Murphy (1890–1949), Associate Justice, Supreme Court of the United States; Judge Recorder's Court.
- Martha Nussbaum (present) Ernst Freund Distinguished Service Professor of Law and Ethics at the University of Chicago
- Richard Posner (1939–2026), judge, United States Court of Appeals for the Seventh Circuit
- Lysander Spooner (1808–1887), Abolitionist, Jurist, Lawyer, Entrepreneur
- Joseph Story (1779–1845), Associate Justice, Supreme Court of the United States
- Roger J. Traynor (1900–1983), Chief Justice, Supreme Court of California
- Earl Warren (1891–1974), Chief Justice of the United States
- John Minor Wisdom (1905–1999), judge, United States Court of Appeals for the Fifth Circuit
- William Rehnquist (1924–2005), Chief Justice of the United States
- Antonin Scalia (1936–2016), Associate Justice, Supreme Court of the United States

== Canon law ==
- Eugenio Corecco—(1931–1995), notable for his contributions to the philosophy, theology, and fundamental theory of Catholic canon law
- John D. Faris—(born 1951), prominent scholar of Eastern Catholic canon law
- Pietro Gasparri—(1852–1934), architect of the 1917 Code of Canon Law
- Edward N. Peters—(born 1957), Referendary of the Apostolic Signatura (legal consultant to the highest canonical court), prominent scholar of canon law

== International Courts at the Hague ==
- Bruno Simma
- Claude Jorda
- Rosalyn Higgins
- Luis Moreno Ocampo
- Carla Del Ponte
