= Tassos =

- Gender: male
- Language: Greek

Origin
- Meaning: resurrection

Other names
- Related names: Anastasius, Anastasia

Tassos is a Greek male given name, which is a diminutive form of Anastasios and means "resurrection". Tassos or Tasos may refer to:

- Anastasios Avlonitis (born 1990), Greek footballer nicknamed "Tasos"
- Anastasios Chatzigiovanis (born 1997), Greek footballer nicknamed "Tasos"
- Tasos Chatzivasileiou (born 1981), Greek politician
- Tasos Chonias (born 1974), Greek painter
- Tassos Denegris (1934–2009), Greek poet
- Anastasios Dentsas (born 1982), Greek footballer nicknamed "Tasos"
- Tasos Diakogiorgis (1924–2007), Greek musician and music teacher
- Tasos Dimas (born 1988), Greek basketball player
- Tasos Dimos (born 1960), Greek painter and sculptor
- Anastasios Donis (born 1996), Greek footballer nicknamed "Tasos"
- Anastasios Douvikas (born 1999), Greek footballer nicknamed "Tasos"
- Tasos Giannitsis (born 1944), Greek politician, economist and business executive
- Tassos Isaac (1972–1996), Greek Cypriot refugee beaten to death by a mob of Turkish far-right ultranationalists
- Tasos Kamateros (born 2000), Greek basketball player
- Anastasios Karagiozis (born 1997), Greek footballer nicknamed "Tasos"
- Anastasios Karakoutsis (born 1983), Greek football goalkeeper nicknamed "Tasos"
- Anastasios Karamanos (born 1990), Greek footballer nicknamed "Tasos"
- Anastasios Kissas (born 1988), Cypriot football goalkeeper nicknamed "Tasos"
- Tasos Konstantinou (1951–2019), Cypriot footballer
- Tasos Kostis (born 1951), Greek film and voice actor
- Tasos Kourakis (1948−2021), Greek pediatrician, geneticist and politician
- Anastasios Kritikos (footballer, born 1914), Greek footballer nicknamed "Tasos"
- Anastasios Kritikos (footballer, born 1995), Greek footballer nicknamed "Tasos"
- Anastasios Lagos (born 1992), Greek footballer
- Tasos Leivaditis (1922–1988), Greek poet, short story writer and literary critic
- Tassos Mantzavinos (born 1958), Greek painter
- Tasos Mitropoulos (born 1957), Greek politician and former footballer
- Tasos Mitsopoulos (1965–2014), Cypriot politician
- Anastasios Nyfadopoulos (born 1992), Greek interdisciplinary artist
- Tassos Papadopoulos (1934–2008), Cypriot politician and president
- Tasos Pappas (born 1984), Greek footballer
- Tasos Stasinos (born 1985), Greek footballer
- Tasos Tasiopoulos (born 1968), Greek footballer
- Tasos Telloglou (born 1961), Greek investigative journalist
- Tasos Tsokanis (born 1991), Greek footballer nicknamed "Tasos"
- Tasos Vasiliou (1938–2018), Greek footballer
- Anastasios Venetis (born 1980), Greek footballer nicknamed "Tasos"
- Tasos Vidouris (1888–1967), Greek poet and author
- Tasos Zachopoulos (born 1975), Greek footballer
