= Anastacio (name) =

Anastacio or Anastácio is a given name and surname. Notable people with that name include

== Given name ==
- Anastácio Artur Ruben Sicato, Angolan politician
- Anastácio Alves (born 1963), Portuguese priest
- Anastacio Caedo (1907–1990), Filipino sculptor
- Anastacio Martínez (born 1978), Dominican baseball pitcher
- Anastacio Reyes (born 1949), Mexican basketball player
- Anastacio Vera (born 1985), Paraguayan footballer

== Middle name ==
- João Anastácio Rosa (1812–1884), Portuguese actor and sculptor
- José Anastácio da Cunha (1744 – 1787), Portuguese mathematician

== Surname ==
- Ignacio Anastacio, Palauan politician
- Sabino Anastacio, Palauan politician
- Maurício de Oliveira Anastácio (born 1962), Brazilian footballer
- Adílson Luíz Anastácio (born 1959), Brazilian footballer

== See also ==
- Anastacio (disambiguation)
- Anastacia (given name)
- Anastacio (disambiguation)
- Anastasio
- Anastasius (disambiguation)
