= Chora Metsovo =

As of the mid-17th century when the Ottomans applied a special tax-administrative regime in the area, the Metsovo region comprises a federation of five mountainous settlements in northern Greece. In various administrative documents surviving from the 18th century onwards, this federation is referred to as Chora Metzovou or Chora Metsovou with its mahalades (meaning including its neighboring settlements).

The word Chora defines the settlement of Metsovo that was the largest one in the area, while the word mahalades means the surrounding settlements of Malakasi, Koutsoufleani (now Platanistos), Milia and Anilio. The borders of the Chora Metzovou initially also included the municipal lands of the settlement Derventista (now Anthohori) which was later on excluded. According to historical signs the establishment of the Chora Metzovou was based on a pre-existing geographical and administrative regime which goes back to at least the early Ottoman period.

Although Metsovo had the economic, land and demographic dominance in the area, decisions were made by the joint assembly of Chora and the Mahalades, which had their own community land and, initially at least, their own municipal authorities. As of the mid-18th century, however, the governance of Chora takes on a more oligarchic form, where the powers were concentrated in the hands of the aristocrats of Metsovo and the political role of the mahalades was limited.

The geographical area that comprised the Chora Metsovou was for many centuries a unified geographical, administrative and religious region, regardless of the changes in its taxation and political regime, especially during the 19th century. The fact that it belonged to a common church authority was a major unifying factor for its residents.

== See also ==
- Valley of Millia, important in the relation of Chora Metsovo with the settlement Milia.

== Sources ==
- G. Plataris, Kodikas Choras Metsovou ton eton 1708-1907 [Chora Metsovou Log of the years 1708-1907], Athens 1982,
- Th. Dasoulas, Agrotikes koinonies tou oreinou chorou kata tin othomaniki periodo: o georgikos kosmos tis “Choras Metzovou” (18os -19os ai.) [Agrarian society in highland areas during the Ottoman period: farmer's population of the land of Metzovo (18th c. - 19th c.)], publ. EADD (National Archive of PhD Theses, ), 2009, pp. 127–148
- M. Tritos, “Ta sozomena firmania ton pronomion tou Metsovou” [The surviving firmans about the privileges granted to Metsovo], Minutes of the 1st Conference of Metsovite Studies, Athens 1993, pp. 411
- V. Skafidas, “Istoria tou Metsovou” [History of Metsovo], Epirotiki Estia 11/117 (1962), p. 318.
- I. Lampridis, “Malakasiaka”, Epirotika Meletimata [Epirote Studies] 5 (1888), publ. 2. Society for Epirote Studies. (EHM), Ioannina 1993, pp. 36, 37
- Source: Th. Dasoulas, Agrotikes koinonies tou oreinou chorou kata tin othomaniki periodo: o georgikos kosmos tis “Choras Metzovou” (18os -19os ai.) [Agrarian society in highland areas during the Ottoman period: farmer's population of the land of Metzovo (18th c. - 19th c.)], publ. EADD (National Archive of PhD Theses, http://hdl.handle.net/10442/hedi/17726), 2009, pp. 476
