= Tsonis =

Tsonis is a Greek surname. Notable people with the name include:

- Anastasios Tsonis (fl. 1976), Greek American atmospheric scientist
- Chris Tsonis (born 1991), American soccer player
- Tas Tsonis (born 1951), Greek computer scientist

== See also ==
- Tsoni, Greek surname
