= Ameru =

Ameru may refer to:

- Milea, Ioannina (Aromanian: Ameru), an Aromanian village in Greece
- Ameru people, a Bantu ethnic group in Meru County, Kenya
