= Crisis (sculpture) =

Sculpture in Greece

Crisis (sculpture) is a public artwork by Anastasios Nyfadopoulos, installed in 2015 on Vouliagmenis Avenue in the municipality of Elliniko–Argyroupoli, Athens, Greece. The sculpture depicts the impact of the Global Financial Crisis on individuals and communities.

== Background ==
Crisis was conceived in the early 2010s during a period of economic and social crisis in Greece, and Nyfadopoulos worked on the public work for approximately 18 months. The sculpture, has been described by multiple outlets as the first public sculpture in the world to address the Global Financial Crisis and its impact on humanity.

After its completion, Crisis was donated to the municipality of Elliniko–Argyroupoli and installed in a prominent roadside location on Vouliagmenis Avenue 602A, a major thoroughfare linking central Athens with its southern coastal districts.

== Description ==
Crisis depicts a human figure positioned to jump from a steeply descending economic indicator resembling a stock market graph, which fractures upon impact with the ground. Contemporary accounts emphasized the duality of the figure’s movement, which has been interpreted either as a fall or as a jump to start anew, allowing for multiple readings of the scene.

The sculpture measures approximately 6.8 metres in length, 3.4 metres in width, and 3.7 metres in height. It is constructed from industrial materials including carbon fibre, fiberglass, epoxy resins, iron, and concrete.

The sculpture is permanently installed near a bridge along Vouliagmenis Avenue, a setting described as deliberately exposed to everyday public life rather than a museum or enclosed exhibition space. The sculpture’s visibility encourages spontaneous interaction by pedestrians and motorists.

Public reactions to the sculpture included moments of quiet observation and placing flowers at its base, suggesting its role as a site of informal collective reflection.

== Interpretation and themes ==
Crisis has been interpreted as focusing on the human consequences of economic collapse rather than on abstract financial systems. Commentary has emphasized the sculpture’s deliberately dual symbolism, particularly the movement of the figure, which some critics have interpreted both as a gesture of despair and as a step toward renewal. Greek cultural coverage has noted that this openness allows the work to be understood either as a depiction of irreversible decline or as a moment of transition.

Cultural commentators have also drawn attention to the division of the sculpture’s base into two symmetrical sections, one occupied by the figure and the other left empty, as well as the presence of two identical left shoes on the fractured base, which have been cited as reinforcing these contrasting interpretations.

== Reception and critical response ==
Following its unveiling in April 2015, Crisis received significant coverage in both Greek and international media. The Guardian described it as Greece’s first monument explicitly addressing the financial crisis and noted its emergence as a focal point in public space during a period of political and economic instability.

Reports by Associated Press and Xinhua News Agency presented the sculpture as a symbolic response to the wider European debt crisis and emphasized its accessibility as a public artwork.

Greek national newspapers and cultural outlets documented sustained public engagement with the sculpture and situated it within broader discussions of contemporary public art and collective memory.

In 2018, the artist, Nyfadopoulos, received a Global Arts Award from the UK-based organization Red Line Artworks for his Crisis artwork.

== Later context ==
In later years, Crisis continued to be referenced in retrospective reporting marking anniversaries of the Global Financial Crisis. Articles published around the sculpture’s tenth anniversary described it as a recurring point of reference in discussions of crisis-related art and public memory.

On the occasion of the sculpture’s tenth anniversary, artists from Austria, Canada, the Cayman Islands, England, Greece, Italy, and the United States participated in the exhibition Art about the Here and Now, which focused on contemporary issues.
