= Bakirtzis =

Bakirtzis (Greek: Μπακιρτζής) is a Greek surname, from Turkish bakırcı, "coppersmith". Notable persons with this name include:

- Anastasios Bakirtzis (born 1956), Greek engineer
- Evripidis Bakirtzis (1895–1947), Greek soldier
