= Anastasio =

Anastasio is both a given name and a surname. Notable people with the name include:

== People with the given name ==
- Anastasio Alfaro (1865–1951), Costa Rican zoologist, geologist and explorer
- Anastasio Aquino (1792–1833), Salvadoran indigenous leader
- Anastasio Ballestrero (1913–1998), Italian prelate of the Roman Catholic Church
- Anastasio Bustamante (1780–1853), President of Mexico
- Anastasio Cuschieri (1872–1962), Maltese poet, politician, and philosopher
- Anastasio Somoza Debayle (1925–1980), President of Nicaragua
- Anastasio Somoza García (1896–1956), President of Nicaragua
- Anastasio Somoza Portocarrero (20th century), Nicaraguan anti-communist

== People with the surname ==
- Albert Anastasia (1902–1957), born Albert Anastasio, American mobster
- Anthony Anastasio (1906–1963), American mobster and labor racketeer
- Armando Anastasio (born 1996), Italian footballer
- Michael R. Anastasio (born 1948), director of the Los Alamos National Laboratory
- Trey Anastasio (born 1964), American guitarist, composer, and vocalist
- Marco Anastasio (born 1997), simply known as Anastasio, Italian rapper and singer

== See also ==
- José Anastasio Torrens
- Anastasia
- Anastacio (name)
- Anastasia (surname)
- Anastasius (disambiguation)
