= Peter the Patrician =

Byzantine historian

Peter

Magister officiorum of the Byzantine Empire
- In office 539–565
- Monarch: Justinian I
- Preceded by: Basilides
- Succeeded by: Anastasius

Personal details
- Born: c. 500
- Died: 565

Peter the Patrician (Latin: Petrus Patricius, Greek: Πέτρος ὁ Πατρίκιος, Petros ho Patrikios; c. 500–565) was a senior Byzantine official, diplomat, and historian. A well-educated and successful lawyer, he was repeatedly sent as envoy to Ostrogothic Italy in the prelude to the Gothic War of 535–554. Despite his diplomatic skill, he was not able to avert war, and was imprisoned by the Goths in Ravenna for a few years. Upon his release, he was appointed to the post of magister officiorum, head of the imperial secretariat, which he held for an unparalleled 26 years. In this capacity, he was one of the leading ministers of Emperor Justinian I (r. 527–565), playing an important role in the Byzantine emperor's religious policies and the relations with Sassanid Persia; most notably he led the negotiations for the peace agreement of 562 that ended the 20-year-long Lazic War. His historical writings survive only in fragments, but provide unique source material on early Byzantine ceremonies and diplomatic issues between Byzantium and the Sassanids.

== Biography ==
=== Early career: envoy to Italy ===
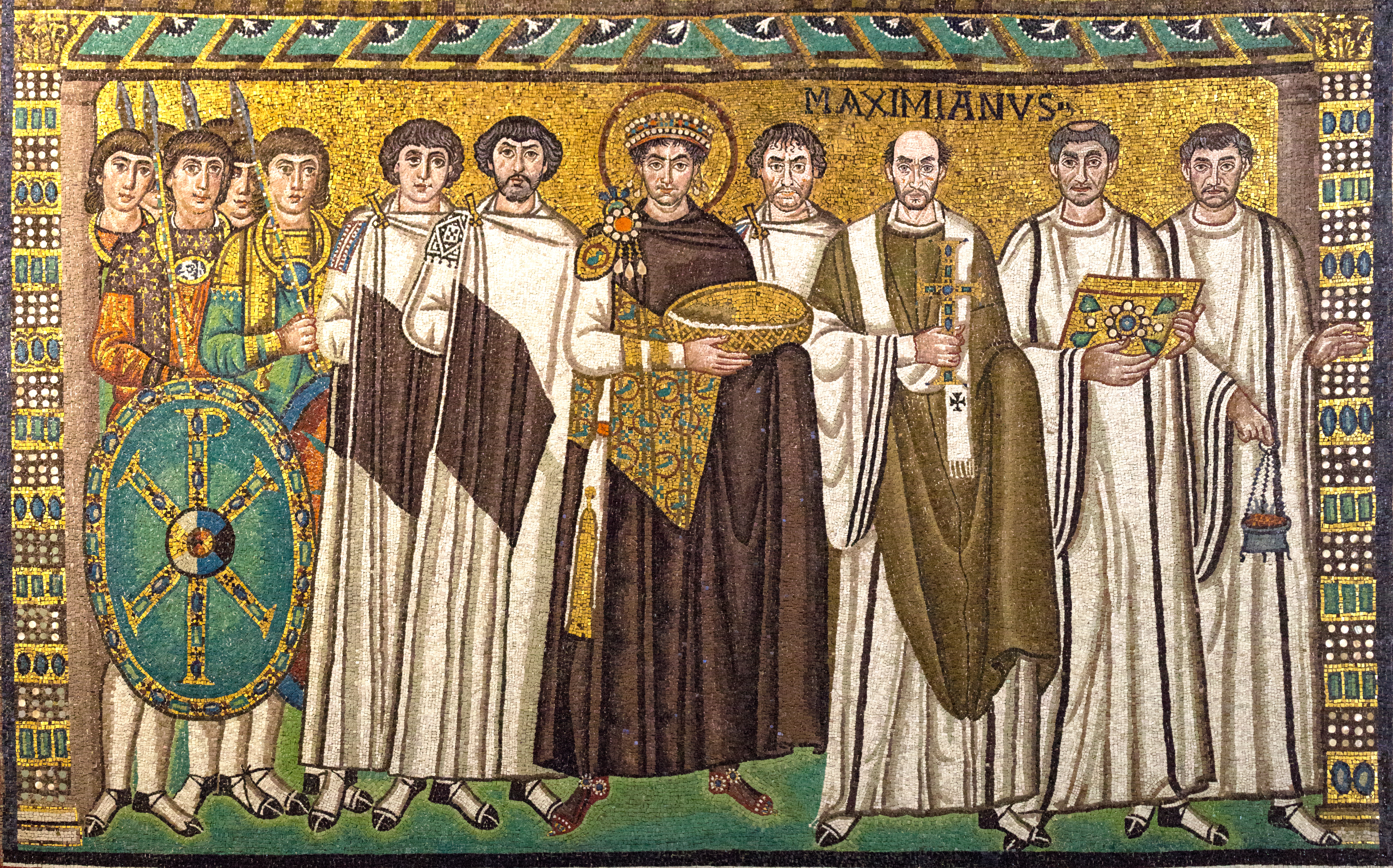
Emperor Justinian I (r. 527–565) and his entourage, mosaic from the Basilica of San Vitale in Ravenna

Peter was born in Thessalonica about the year 500, and was of Illyrian origin according to Procopius; according to Theophylact Simocatta, however, his origin was from Solachon, near Dara in Mesopotamia. After studying law, he embarked on a successful career as a lawyer in Constantinople, which brought him to the attention of Empress Theodora. During his time in Constantinople, Peter lived in the so-called "old Petrin" house that was later named after himself. In 534, on account of his rhetorical skills, he was employed as an imperial envoy to the Ostrogothic court at Ravenna. At the time, a power struggle was developing there between Queen Amalasuntha, regent to the young king Athalaric, and her cousin Theodahad. Following the death of Athalaric, Theodahad usurped the throne, imprisoned Amalasuntha, and sent messages to Emperor Justinian hoping for recognition. Peter met the envoys at Aulon, on his way to Italy, and notified Constantinople, seeking new instructions. Emperor Justinian ordered him to convey the message to Theodahad that Amalasuntha was under the Emperor's protection and not to be harmed. Nevertheless, at the time Peter arrived in Italy, Amalasuntha had been killed; Procopius's narrative in the Gothic War is ambiguous here, but in his Secret History, he explicitly claims that Peter arranged the murder of Amalasuntha on instructions from Theodora, who feared her as a potential rival for Justinian's attentions. Whatever assurances might have been privately given by Theodora to Theodahad, in public, Peter strongly condemned the act, and declared that there would be "war without truce between the emperor and themselves" as a result.

Peter then returned to Constantinople with letters from Theodahad and the Roman Senate to the imperial couple, bearing pleas for a peaceful solution, but by the time he reached the imperial capital, Emperor Justinian had resolved on war and was preparing his forces. Consequently, Peter returned to Italy in the summer of 535 conveying an ultimatum: only if Theodahad abdicated and returned Italy to imperial rule, could war be averted. A two-pronged Byzantine offensive followed soon thereafter, attacking the outlying possessions of the Ostrogothic kingdom: Belisarius took Sicily, while Mundus invaded Dalmatia. Upon hearing these news, Theodahad despaired, and Peter was able to secure wide-ranging concessions from him: Sicily was to be ceded to the Byzantine Empire; the Gothic king's authority within Italy was severely restricted; a gold crown was to be sent as an annual tribute and up to 3,000 men were to be provided for the imperial army, underlining Theodahad's subject status. Theodahad, however, fearing that his first offer would be rejected, then instructed Peter, under oath, to offer the cession of all Italy, but only if the original concessions were rejected by Justinian. In the event, Justinian rejected the first proposal, and was delighted to learn of the second one. Peter was sent back to Italy with Athanasius, bearing letters to Theodahad and the Gothic nobles, and for a time it seemed as if the cradle of the Roman Empire would return peacefully to the fold. It was not to be: upon their arrival in Ravenna, the Byzantine envoys found Theodahad in a changed disposition. Supported by the Gothic nobility and buoyed up by a success against Mundus in Dalmatia, he resolved to resist, and imprisoned the ambassadors.

=== Magister officiorum ===
Peter remained imprisoned in Ravenna for three years, until released in June/July 539 by the new Gothic king, Witigis, in exchange for Gothic envoys. As a reward for his services, Emperor Justinian then appointed Peter to the post of magister officiorum ("Master of the Offices"), one of the highest positions in the state, heading the palace secretariat, the imperial guards (the Scholae Palatinae), and the Public Post with the dreaded agentes in rebus. He would hold this post for 26 consecutive years, longer by a wide margin than any other before or after. At about the same time or shortly thereafter, he was raised to the supreme title of patrician and the supreme senatorial rank of gloriosissimus ("most glorious one"). He was also awarded an honorary consulship. As magister, he took part in the discussions with Western bishops in 548 on the Three-Chapter Controversy, and was repeatedly sent as an envoy in 551–553 to Pope Vigilius, who opposed the emperor on the issue. Peter is also recorded as attending the Second Council of Constantinople in May 553.

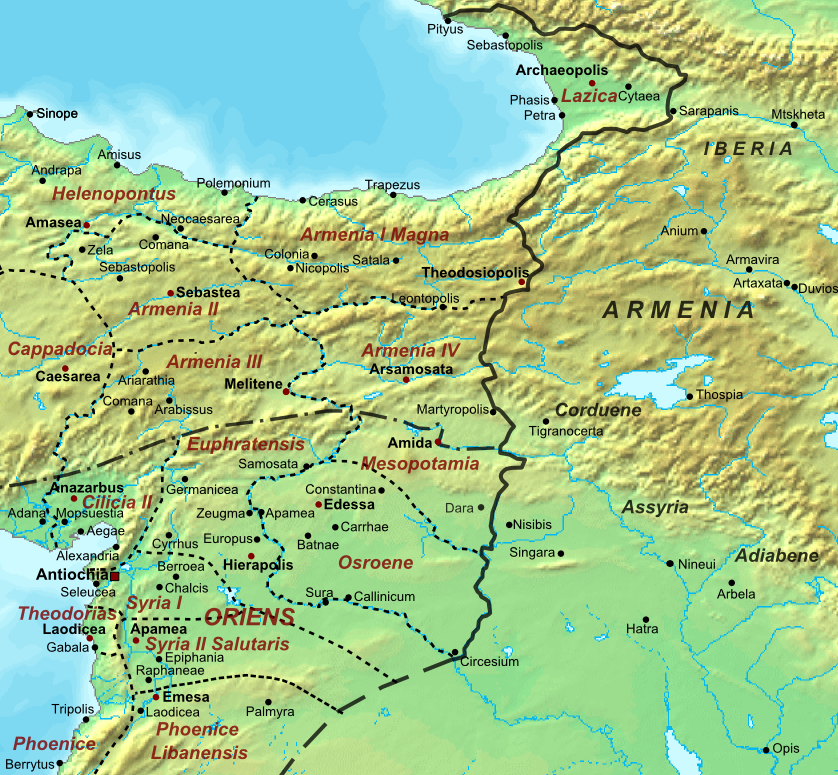
The Roman–Persian border as agreed in 561–562

In 550, he was sent as envoy by Justinian to negotiate a peace treaty with Persia, a role he reprised in 561, when he met the Persian envoy Izedh Gushnap at Dara, to end the Lazic War. Reaching an agreement over the Persian evacuation of Lazica and the delineation of the border in Armenia, the two envoys concluded a fifty-year peace between the two empires and their respective allies. The annual Roman subsidies to Persia would resume, but the amount was lowered from 500 to 420 pounds of gold. Further clauses regulated cross-border trade, which was to be limited to the two cities of Dara and Nisibis, the return of fugitives, and the protection of the respective religious minorities (Christians in the Persian Empire and Zoroastrians in Byzantium). In exchange for Persian recognition for the existence of Dara, whose construction had originally sparked a brief war, the Byzantines agreed to limit their troops there and remove the seat of the magister militum per Orientem from the city. As disagreements remained on two border areas, Suania and Ambros, in spring 562, Peter travelled to Persia to negotiate directly with the Persian Shah, Chosroes I, without however achieving a result. He then returned to Constantinople, where he died sometime after March 565.

His son Theodore, nicknamed Kontocheres or Zetonoumios, would succeed him as magister officiorum in 566 under Justin II, after a brief interval where the post was held by the quaestor sacri palatii ("Quaestor of the Sacred Palace") Anastasius. He held the post until some time before 576, being appointed as comes sacrarum largitionum ("Count of the Sacred Largess") thereafter; in the same year, he also led an unsuccessful embassy to Persia to end the ongoing war over the Caucasus.

== Assessment ==
As one of the leading officials of the age, Peter was a controversial figure, receiving greatly differing assessments from his contemporaries. To John Lydus, a mid-level bureaucrat of the praetorian prefecture of the East, Peter was a paragon of every virtue, an intelligent, firm but fair administrator and a kind man. Procopius in his public histories attests his mild manners and desire to avoid giving insult, but in his private Secret History he accuses him of "robbing the scholares" (the members of the Scholae) and being "the biggest thief in the world and absolutely filled with shameful avarice", as well as being responsible for the murder of Amalasuntha. In the Patria of Constantinople, Peter is said to have been called "Barsymios the Syrian, who held many honours with distinction."

From quite early in his career, Peter was renowned for his learning, his passion for reading, and his discussions with scholars. As a speaker, he was eloquent and persuasive; Procopius calls him "fitted by nature to persuade men", while Cassiodorus, who witnessed his embassies to the Ostrogoth court, also praises him as vir eloquentissimus and disertissimus ("most eloquent man"), and as sapientissimus ("most wise"). On the other hand, the late 6th-century historian Menander Protector, who relied on Peter's work for his own history, accuses him of boastfulness and of rewriting the records to enhance his own role and performance in the negotiations with the Persians.

== Writings ==
Peter wrote three books, all of which survive only in fragments: a history of the first four centuries of the Roman Empire, from the death of Julius Caesar in 44 BC to the death of Emperor Constantius II in 361 AD, of which about twenty fragments are extant (it has been suggested that the third-century material in this was taken from Philostratus); a history of the office of magister officiorum from its institution under Constantine the Great (r. 306–337) to the time of Justinian, containing a list of its holders and descriptions of various imperial ceremonies, several of which are reproduced in chapters 84–95 of the first volume of the 10th-century De Ceremoniis of Emperor Constantine VII Porphyrogennetos (r. 913–959); and an account of his diplomatic mission to the Persian Empire in 561–562, which was used as a source by Menander Protector, and is found in Constantine's Excerpta. Until recently, Peter was also ascribed the authorship of the 6th-century Peri Politikes Epistemes ("On Political Science"), a six-volume book discussing political theory, drawing extensively from Classical texts such as Plato's The Republic and Cicero's De re publica. It too survives only in fragments.

Peter was the first late Roman/Byzantine author to write on imperial ceremonies, beginning a tradition that lasted unto the 14th century. His histories are also an important historical source; for instance, his work alone preserves the negotiations and provisions of the Roman–Persian treaty of 298 between Galerius and Narseh.

The Lost History of Peter the Patrician, published by Routledge in 2015, is an annotated translation from the Greek by Thomas M. Banchich of the fragments of Peter's History, including additional fragments which used to be considered the work of the Roman historian Cassius Dio's so-called Anonymous Continuator, the Anonymus post Dionem.

== Sources ==
- Bury, John Bagnell (1923) [1889]. History of the Later Roman Empire: From Arcadius to Irene (395 A.D. to 800 A.D.), Volume II. New York and London: Macmillan & Company.
- Dignas, Beate; Winter, Engelbert (2007). Rome and Persia in Late Antiquity: Neighbours and Rivals. Cambridge: Cambridge University Press. ISBN 978-0-521-61407-8.
- Evans, James Allan Stewart (1996). The Age of Justinian: The Circumstances of Imperial Power. New York: Routledge. ISBN 0-415-02209-6.
- Kazhdan, Alexander, ed. (1991). The Oxford Dictionary of Byzantium. Oxford and New York: Oxford University Press. ISBN 0-19-504652-8.
- Lee, A. D. (1993). Information and Frontiers: Roman Foreign Relations in Late Antiquity. Cambridge: Cambridge University Press. ISBN 978-0-521-39256-3.
- Maas, Michael (2005). The Cambridge Companion to the Age of Justinian. Cambridge: Cambridge University Press. ISBN 0-521-81746-3.
- Martindale, John R., ed. (1992). The Prosopography of the Later Roman Empire: Volume III, AD 527–641. Cambridge: Cambridge University Press. ISBN 0-521-20160-8.
- Potter, David S. (1990). Prophecy and History in the Crisis of the Roman Empire: A Historical Commentary on the Thirteenth Sibylline Oracle. Oxford: Clarendon Press.
