= Anastacio (disambiguation) =

Anastacio or Anastácio may refer to the following:

- Anastacio (name)
- Anastácio, Brazilian municipality
- Santo Anastácio, Brazilian municipality
- Santo Anastácio River, Brazilian river

== See also ==
- Los Anastacios, Panamanian subdivision
- Casa-Museu Dr. Anastácio Gonçalves
