= Tsoni =

Tsoni is a Greek surname. Notable people with the surname include:

- Mary Tsoni (1987–2017), Greek actress and singer
- Maria Tsoni (born 1963), Greek sprinter

== See also ==
- Tsonis, Greek surname
- Liara T'Soni, fictional character from the Mass Effect franchise
