= Valley of Millia =

The peaks that surround the settlement of Milia, located 19 kilometers northeast of Metsovo in northern Greece, form an open valley which gradually ends in a narrow passage.

This important passageway between Epirus and Macedonia was also known as "Mpougazi tis Milias" and had been used since ancient times. The creeks that spring from the slopes of the mountains surrounding the valley converge to form one of the western arms of the river Venetiko, one on the main tributaries of Aliakmonas river.

The settlement of Milia is located at an altitude of 1,260 meters at the point where the three first springs of the river meet. There are indications that the settlement had been there as early as the beginning of the 14th century while its existence is certified from the mid-15th century. The historic relation of the settlement of Millia with Chora Metsovo is closely associated with the safeguarding of this important passage that crossed the valley and the Mpougazi tis Milias.

The task of serving the travelers passing through the narrow passage involved everyone in the settlement, which reflects the immediate association of the management of the inns located in the valley and the obligations undertaken by the local residents as guards of the passage in exchange for certain privileges.

== Sources ==
- S. Pournaras, I Vlachomilia tis Pindou “AMEROU” [Vlachomilia of Pindos ‘AMEROU’], publ. Maiandros-Sillogos Milias, Thessaloniki 1987
- Livy, 43, chapter 21 par.4, Harvard University Press 1961
- St. Aristarchis, “Ekthesis epi ton diagonismaton Thessalias kai Epirou”, [Report on the examinations in Epirus and Thessaly] O en Konstantinoupolei Ellinikos Filologikos Sillogos 13-15 (1867), pp. 31–34.
- Μ. Delibaşi.–M. Arikan., Sûret-i Defter-i Sancak-i Tirhala I, Türk Tarih Kurumu, Ankara 2001, pp. 26–27
- A. Koukoudis, Oi mitropoleis kai I diaspora ton Vlachon, [Major Cities and Diaspora of the Vlachs], publ. University Studio Press, Thessaloniki 1999, pp. 57, 58
- G. Plataris, Kodikas Choras Metsovou ton eton 1708-1907 [Chora Metsovou Log of the years 1708-1907], Athens 1982, pp. 27, 34, 35, 68, 69, 87.
- W. M. Leake, Travels in northern Greece, Vol. 1, Α.Μ.Ηakkert-Publisher, (photographic reprint Amsterdam 1967), p. 297
- Th. Dasoulas, Agrotikes koinonies tou oreinou chorou kata tin othomaniki periodo: o georgikos kosmos tis “Choras Metzovou” (18os -19os ai.) [Agrarian society in highland areas during the Ottoman period: farmer's population of the land of Metzovo (18th c. - 19th c.)], publ. EADD (National Archive of PhD Theses, http://hdl.handle.net/10442/hedi/17726), 2009, pp. 197 – 204
- F. C. H. L. Pouqueville, Taksidi stin Ellada, Makedonia-Thessalia [Voyage de la Grece: Macedonie-Thessalie], transl. N. Molfeta, publ. Afon Tolidi, Athens 1995, p. 216
