= Anastasios Voulgaris =

Bulgarian-born Greek revolutionary during the Greek War of independence

Anastasios Voulgaris Αναστάσιος Βούλγαρης
- Died: 1839

Anastasios or Athanasios Voulgaris (Greek: Αναστάσιος, Αθανάσιος Βούλγαρης; Bulgarian: Атанас Българин) was a Greek revolutionary of Bulgarian origin, from Piyanets, a hero of the Greek War of Independence. Anastasios Voulgaris died in 1839, leaving a widow, a daughter and a son, Leonidas Voulgaris.
