= Anastasios Manakis =

Greek revolutionary (c. 1790 – 1864)

- Αναστάσιος Μανάκης-Μιχάλογλου
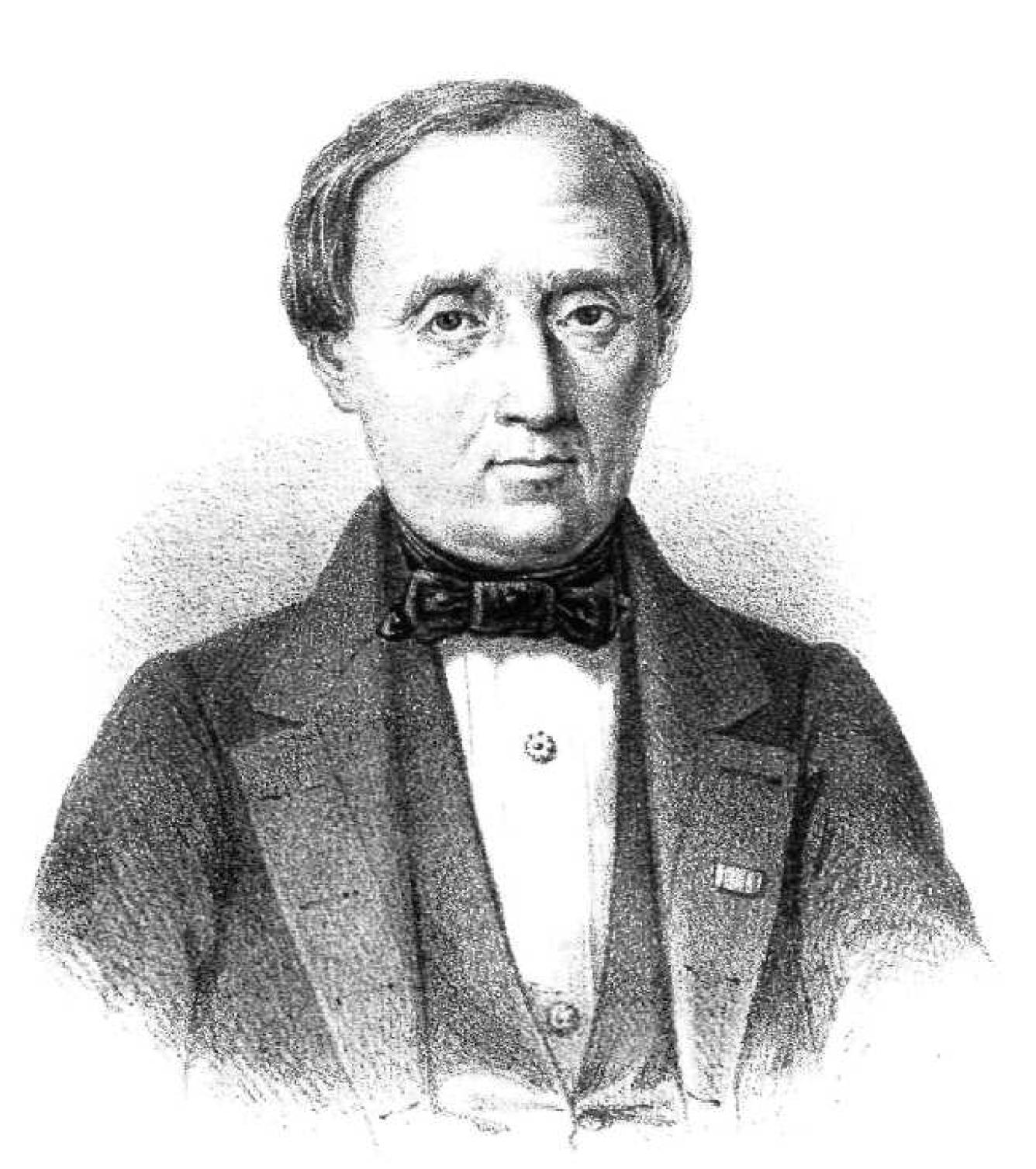
- A portrait of Anastasios Manakis
- Born: 1790; Anilio, Pashalik of Yanina, Ottoman Empire (now Greece)
- Died: 27 July 1864 (aged 73–74); Athens, Kingdom of Greece
- Military career
- Allegiance: (Greece) First Hellenic Republic
- Branch: Hellenic Army
- Unit: Sacred Band
- Conflicts: Greek War of Independence; Wallachian Uprising; Battle of Drăgășani; Battle of Dervenakia; Third Siege of Missolonghi
- Other work: Member of the Filiki Etaireia; Greek consul to Belgrade

Anastasios Manakis or Michaloglou (Greek: Αναστάσιος Μανάκης-Μιχάλογλου; c. 1790 – 27 July 1864) was a Greek revolutionary of the Greek War of Independence.

== Biography ==
Manakis was an Aromanian. He born in about 1790 in Epirus. He was from the Aromanian village of Anilio but at an early age moved to Constantinople and worked as an animal merchant. In 1818 he was initiated into the Filiki Eteria. In 1820, Alexandros Ypsilantis commissioned him to either free or murder Aristeidis Papas, who had been sent to Serbia to encourage the Serbs to rise up against the Ottomans and held secret documents of the Filiki Etairia. His mission failed.

After the outbreak of the revolution in the Danubian Principalities in 1821, he attacked, along with Diamantis Serdaris and Ioannis Solomontas against Jovan Rogobeci, killing him. Together with Giorgakis Olympios, they saved the remaining Sacred Band revolutionaries after the Battle of Drăgășani. Subsequently, he was besieged by the Ottomans. Following the forced submission of other chieftains, he escaped in disguise to the Austrian Empire. Although he was jailed for violating Austrian neutrality, he managed to escape and flee to the Peloponnese in 1825.

He fought in the Battle of Dervenakia and in the Third Siege of Missolonghi. He then fled to Belgrade, returning to Greece in 1826 where he served under Ioannis Kolettis. After the liberation, he founded schools and libraries in Athens and the provinces, and supplied the police with uniforms and guns in Athens and Piraeus. In 1844 he became consul of Greece in Belgrade until 1849.

He died in 1864.
