= Anastasios John Kanellopoulos =

Greek-American eye surgeon

Anastasios John Kanellopoulos (born in Chicago, USA) is a Greek-American eye surgeon specializing in corneal transplantation, cornea crosslinking for keratoconus, complicated cataract surgery and complicated glaucoma. Widely known for research and clinical contributions in micro-incision cataract, customized laser refractive surgery and corneal cross-linking propagation and most innovations, reducing corneal transplants for advanced keratoconus.

== Education ==
His background includes medical degree from Southern Illinois University, Ophthalmology Residency at the State University of New York at Stony Brook / Nassau County Medical Center and clinical fellowships: Corneal and Refractive Surgery at Cornell University in New York, Glaucoma at Harvard University School and keratoprosthesis fellowship training with Claes Dohlman at Harvard University.

== Career ==
Kanellopoulos is the founder and medical director of the LaserVision Clinical & Research Eye Institute based in Athens, Greece. Since 2010 he has been advanced to Clinical Professor of Ophthalmology at New York University School of Medicine (associate in 2001). He has served as President of International Society of Refractive Surgery (ISRS) in 2016 & 2017 (the refractive surgery arm and partner of the American Academy of Ophthalmology). In 2019, he was the first Greek Ophthalmologist to receive the Life Achievement Award by the American Academy of Ophthalmology.
