= Johann Georg Reiffenstuel =

Canon law expert (1641–1703)

Johann Georg Reiffenstuel (1641–1703), also known as Anaklet Reiffenstuel, was a canon law expert.

He was born in Kaltenbrunn, Bavaria on 2 July 1641, and died in Freising, Bavaria on 5 October 1703. He was a member of the Franciscan (Reformed) Order, and taught philosophy at Freising, Landshut, and Munich, and canon law at Freising. His works on moral theology and canon law were recognised for their distinction between the two fields.
