= Richard Rosendorff =

Richard Rosendorff (31 July 1875 — 20 April 1941) was a German lawyer, who worked in Berlin. He emigrated to Australia in 1939. He died in Perth in 1941.

== Publications ==
- Das Wechselblanket. 1899.
- The New German Company Law and the English Companies Act, 1929
- Die rechtliche Organisation der Konzerne. Berlin/Vienna 1927. 209 S. - Seite 11-101 mit Bleistiftanstreichungen - Berlin, Spaeth und Linde, 1927. 209 S. OKart. (306-4-0573) Wichtige Schrift! Vortrag, gehalten von einem Berliner Rechtsanwalt und Notar.
- Die Reform des englischen Aktienrechts durch den Companies Act 1929. Ein Beitrag zur Reform des deutschen Aktienrechts - Berlin, Heymanns, 1930. VIII, 156 S. Hlwd (St.a.Titelrückseite).
- Das Internationale Steuerrecht des Erdballs. Zurich: Verlag fur Recht und Gesellschaft, 1936-39.
- "New German company law and the English directors". — Scot.Law R., N., 348-9.
- The British Year Book of International Law - 1921 German law receives just emphasis in articles by Dr. Rudolf Kahn, Dr. Richard Rosendorff, and Dr. E. Haskin.
- Was müssen die Aktionäre und Verwaltungen vom neuen Aktien-recht wissen?, Berlin et al.: Spaeth & Linde (1932).
- Treuhandgesellschaften und ihre Funktionen
- Window-dressing in German interwar balance sheets by Mark Spoerer (University of Hohenheim
- Das internationale Steuerrecht des Erdballs nebst sämtlichen Abkommen zur Vermeidung der Doppelbesteuerung: ... Hrsg. von Richard Rosendorff u. Jos. Henggeler (Umschl.-Tit.): Rosendorff-Henggeler: Das internat. Steuerrecht des Erdballs. Verlag für Recht u. Gesellschaft. 1946.

== See also ==
- German company law
- UK company law
