= Anilio, Ioannina =

Anilio Ανήλιο (Greek) Kiare (Aromanian)
- Community
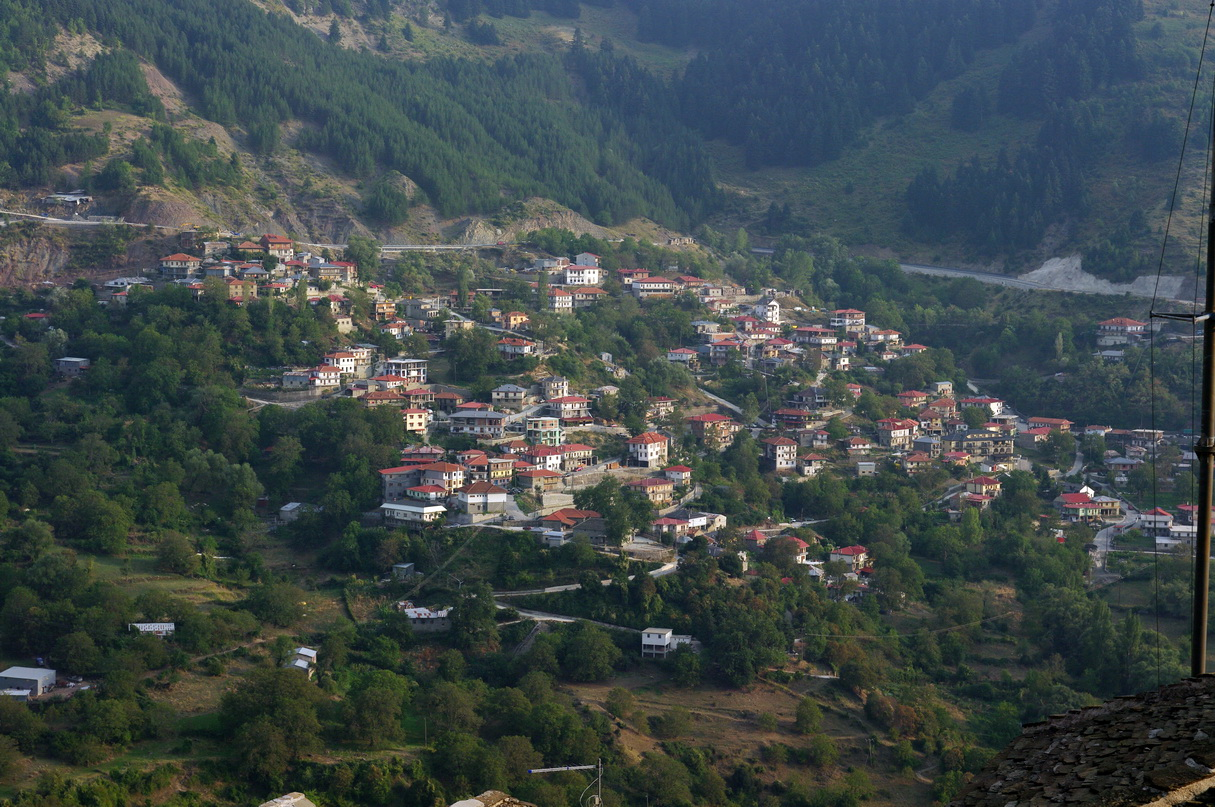
- A view of Anilio.

- Location within Greece
- Coordinates: 39°45.55′N 21°11.3′E
- Country: Greece
- Administrative region: Epirus
- Regional unit: Ioannina
- Municipality: Metsovo
- Municipal unit: Metsovo

Area
  - Community: 42.637 km^{2} (16.462 sq mi)
- Elevation: 1,050 m (3,440 ft)

Population (2021)
  - Community: 548
  - Density: 12.9/km^{2} (33.3/sq mi)
- Time zone: UTC+2 (EET)
  - Summer (DST): UTC+3 (EEST)
- Postal code: 442 00
- Area code: +30-2656
- Vehicle registration: ΙΝ

Anilio (Greek: Ανήλιο, Aromanian: Kiare) is a village and a community of the Metsovo municipality. Since the 2011 local government reform it is part of the municipality Metsovo, of which it is a municipal district. The 2021 census recorded 548 residents in Anilio. The community of Anilio covers an area of 42.637 km^{2}. Anilio is located nearby to Metsovo.

== Name ==
The village name in Aromanian is Kiare and stems from the noun keare, from the verb ker meaning 'to perish, to die' and derived from Latin perire 'to be consumed, to perish', with a change of the Latin p into k in Aromanian. The linguist Kostas Oikonomou stated the Greek toponym Anilio is likely a translation of the Aromanian name Kiare. Due to its position opposite Metsovo, another name in Greek for the village is Prosilio.

== Demographics ==
Anilio has an Aromanian population and is an Aromanian speaking village. In the early 21st century, elderly people were bilingual in the community language and Greek, whereas younger residents under 40 might have understood the community language but did not use it.

== Notable people ==
- Anastasios Manakis (1790–1864), revolutionary of the Greek War of Independence

== See also ==
- List of settlements in the Ioannina regional unit
