= Anastasios Meletidis =

Greek footballer

Personal information
- Date of birth: 20 January 1999 (age 27)
- Place of birth: Thessaloniki, Greece
- Height: 1.74 m (5 ft 9 in)
- Position: Midfielder

Youth career
- 2011–2019: PAOK

Senior career*
| Years | Team | Apps | (Gls) |
| 2019– | PAOK | 0 | (0) |
| 2019–2020 | → Karaiskakis (loan) | 2 | (0) |
| 2020–2021 | → Onisilos Sotira (loan) | 1 | (0) |
| 2021–2023 | PAOK B | 36 | (0) |
| 2023–2024 | Makedonikos | 25 | (0) |
| 2024–2025 | Anagennisi Karditsa | | |
| 2025 | Kavala | 1 | (0) |
- * Club domestic league appearances and goals as of 1 July 2025

Anastasios Meletidis (Greek: Αναστάσιος Μελετίδης; born 20 January 1999) is a Greek professional footballer who plays as a midfielder.
