= Anastacio Vera =

Paraguayan footballer (born 1985)

Personal information
- Full name: Anastacio Daniel Vera Jara
- Date of birth: 5 October 1985 (age 41)
- Place of birth: Lambaré, Paraguay
- Height: 1.81 m (5 ft 11 in)
- Position: Defender

Youth career
- Olimpia

Senior career*
| Years | Team | Apps | (Gls) |
| 2006–2008 | Olimpia | 1 | (0) |
| 2007 | → Everton (loan) | 3 | (0) |
| 2009 | San José | | |
| 2009–2010 | Humaitá | | |
- * Club domestic league appearances and goals

Anastacio Daniel Vera Jara (born 5 October 1985 in Lambaré, Paraguay) is a Paraguayan former footballer who played as a defender.

== Teams ==
- (Paraguay) Olimpia 2006–2007
- (Chile) Everton 2007
- (Paraguay) Olimpia 2008
- (Bolivia) San José 2009
- (Paraguay) Humaitá 2009–2010
