= Isabel de Magalhães Colaço =

First Portuguese female Doctor of Law

- Born: Isabel Maria Moreira de Almeida Tello de Magalhães Colaço; 23 September 1926; Coimbra, Portugal
- Died: 1 November 2004 (aged 78); Lisbon, Portugal
- Occupation: Law professor

Isabel de Magalhães Colaço (1926 – 2004) was a Portuguese lawyer and university professor who was the first woman to obtain a doctorate of law in Portugal and the first woman to sit on the country's Constitutional Court.

== Early life ==
Isabel Maria Moreira de Almeida Tello de Magalhães Colaço was born in Coimbra, Portugal on 23 September 1926, the daughter of João Maria Tello de Magalhães Colaço a senior professor of public law at both Coimbra and Lisbon universities. She graduated in law in 1948, obtaining almost the highest mark possible, and in 1954 was the first woman to obtain a PhD in law in Portugal, from the faculty of law of the University of Lisbon. It would be four more decades before another woman in Portugal would obtain the same qualification.

== Career ==
Hired by the University of Lisbon faculty of law in 1957, Colaço specialized in civil law, international private law, and European Economic Community law. Her desire to lecture was for a time blocked by Marcelo Caetano, her professor and second-in-command in the dictatorial Estado Novo regime in Portugal, who wanted her to work for him and help represent Portugal on international missions. It was not until Caetano left the faculty to concentrate on government matters that she was able to start lecturing, which she continued to do until she retired in 1996. She taught courses on private international law, introduction to the study of law, general theory of civil law, family law, comparative law, European community law, international trade law, international civil procedure law, and international private arbitration. She became the chair of the scientific council of the faculty of law. Over the years her students included three future Portuguese presidents, Mário Soares, Jorge Sampaio, and Marcelo Rebelo de Sousa, a finance minister, António de Sousa Franco, a minister of justice, António de Almeida Santos, and Professor José Hermano Saraiva, who became a minister of education and also a well-known broadcaster on Portugal's history.

After Portugal's Carnation Revolution that overthrew the Estado Novo, Colaço became the President of the Commission charged with restructuring the Faculty of Law. Nationally, she was the first woman to perform legal and constitutional functions in Portugal, first as a member of the State Council (1974–1975) and then, after being elected by the Assembly of the Republic, as a member of the Constitutional Commission, precursor body to the current Constitutional Court. As a constitutional judge, one of her most important contributions was the introduction, within the revision of the Civil Code, of equal rights for children born in and out of marriage. Internationally she became a member of the Rome-based International Institute for the Unification of Private Law (UNIDROIT).

Colaço died on 1 November 2004. On 24 June 2005, she was posthumously awarded the Grand Cross of the Military Order of Saint James of the Sword. On 8 March 2017, she was posthumously awarded the Grand Cross of the Order of Prince Henry.
