= Anastasius (abbot of Euthymius) =

Anastasius (Greek: Ἀναστάσιος) was abbot of Euthymius in Palestine, around 741 CE. He wrote in Greek a work against the Jews, a Latin version of which by Turrianus is printed in the Antiquae Lectiones of Henricus Canisius. The translation is very imperfect. A manuscript of the original work is still extant.
