= Anastasios Tsikaris =

Greek water polo player

Personal information
- Born: September 28, 1966 (age 59)

Sport
- Sport: Water polo

Anastasios Tsikaris (born 28 September 1966) is a Greek former water polo player who competed in the 1988 Summer Olympics, where the Greek water polo team finished in ninth place.
