= Anastácio Artur Ruben Sicato =

Angolan politician

Anastácio Artur Ruben Sicato is an Angolan politician for the UNITA and a member of the National Assembly of Angola.
