= Michael Cicconetti =

American judge

Michael A. Cicconetti

8th Ohio Municipal Court Judge for Painesville, Ohio
- In office January 1994 – September 22, 2019
- Governor: George Voinovich; Nancy Hollister; Bob Taft; Ted Strickland; John Kasich; Mike DeWine
- Preceded by: Neil R. Wilson
- Succeeded by: James R. O'Leary

President of the American Judges Association
- In office 2005–06

President of the Northern Ohio Municipal Judges' Association
- In office 1997–98

Personal details
- Born: Michael Anthony Cicconetti; April 24, 1951 (age 75)
- Party: Republican (since February 2020)
- Other political affiliations: Democratic (before February 2020)
- Spouse: Kelly Cicconetti
- Children: 5
- Education: Saint Leo University, Cleveland State University
- Awards: American Judges Association’s Chief Justice Richard W. Holmes Award of Merit
- Nickname: Judge Chick

Michael A. Cicconetti (born April 24, 1951) is a retired Municipal Court judge who presided in Painesville, Lake County, Ohio, United States. He is known for having dispensed unique sentences, which he has described as "creative justice". He often left the choice of penalty to the defendant, who was faced with spending time in jail or undergoing one of Cicconetti's unusual punishments. These often involved placing the defendant in a similar position to that of the defendant's victim at the time of the crime.

In February 2019, Cicconetti announced that he planned to retire later in the year. He retired from being a judge on September 22, 2019.

== Accolades and legacy ==
Due in part to the popularity of his actions, Cicconetti won the presidency of the American Judges Association.

He has held a four-year term on the Painesville Township Board of Education and has spent fourteen years as a Painesville Township Trustee. He was previously a member of the Coalition of Justice Associations, and served as president of the Northern Ohio Municipal Judges' Association.

Sentences such as Cicconetti's are becoming more popular across the United States, and one judge has cited him specifically as being the influence for one of her own sentences.

== Early life and education ==
Cicconetti is originally from Italy.

He is an Eagle Scout, earning the award in 1964 as a member of Scout Troop 64 in Painesville, Ohio. He was the oldest of nine siblings who had to work on ore boats throughout the Great Lakes as a deckhand and deckwatch to fund himself through college. After graduating from St. Leo University, he became Clerk of the Painesville Municipal Court while attending Cleveland State University Law School at night.

== Personal life ==
Cicconetti has five children and six grandchildren.

Formerly having been a lifelong member of the Democratic Party, he switched to the Republican Party, so he could vote for his son, Gabe, who ran for Recorder of Lake County, Ohio in 2020. In that same statement, he said that he did not regret the choice, citing comments made by then-Senate Minority Leader Chuck Schumer "attacking the Justices of the United States Supreme Court".

== Unusual sentencings ==
- Cicconetti's first "creative" sentence, involving a defendant passing a stopped school bus, occurred in the mid-1990s, where he made the defendant "take a day off of work and ride with the school bus driver so they could see first-hand what happens when a car goes around a school bus, and what the dangers could be".
- In 2005, he offered 26-year-old Ohio housewife Michelle Murray the option of spending a night in the woods for abandoning 35 kittens in a forest in wintertime in return for a reduced prison sentence.
- Two teenagers who scrawled 666 on a nativity figure of Jesus had to lead a donkey through the streets, with a sign saying: "Sorry for the jackass offense, but he is soooo cute!"
- Teenagers who flattened tires on school buses were ordered to throw a picnic for the primary school children whose outing was cancelled due to the prank.
- A man who committed a traffic violation while shouting "pigs" at police officers was made to stand on a street corner with a 350-pound pig and a sign that said "This is not a police officer."
- An 18-year-old male who stole pornography from an adult book store was ordered to sit outside the store wearing a blindfold and holding a sign that read "See no evil."
- Three men soliciting sex were ordered to wear chicken suits holding signs that read "No Chicken Ranch in Painesville".
- In January 2008, Cicconetti sentenced a man who stole a red collection kettle holding about $250 from the Salvation Army to spend 24 hours homeless.
- A woman who was convicted of stealing from a church was ordered to spell out the sentence "I stole coins from this church" entirely in coins and apologize to each worshipper as they entered the church.
- A woman who skipped out on a cab fare was ordered to walk 30 miles in 48 hours. Thirty miles was the distance the cab driver had driven her before she skipped out on the fare.
- A woman who pleaded guilty to assault for using pepper spray on a woman was given the choice to serve 30 days in jail or serve three days of community service and shoot herself with pepper spray. After agreeing to the latter she was sprayed and found out it was only water.
- A woman who pleaded guilty to animal cruelty and neglect for abandoning a dog in an uninhabitable house was given a choice of serving 90 days in jail or picking up garbage for 8 hours in the Lake County Landfill. The defendant chose to work in the landfill.
- A nanny accused of hitting a boy with a belt was compelled to read articles on the consequences of child abuse, and then discuss them in the courtroom in front of the judge, the victim's mother, and spectators.
