= Vamvakofyto =

Vamvakofyto Βαμβακόφυτο
- Community
- Location within the regional unit

- Location within Greece
- Coordinates: 41°10′44″N 23°23′38″E
- Country: Greece
- Administrative region: Central Macedonia
- Regional unit: Serres
- Municipality: Sintiki
- Municipal unit: Sidirokastro
- Elevation: 120 m (390 ft)

Population (2021)
  - Community: 825
- Time zone: UTC+2 (EET)
  - Summer (DST): UTC+3 (EEST)
- Postal code: 623 00
- Vehicle registration: ΕΡ

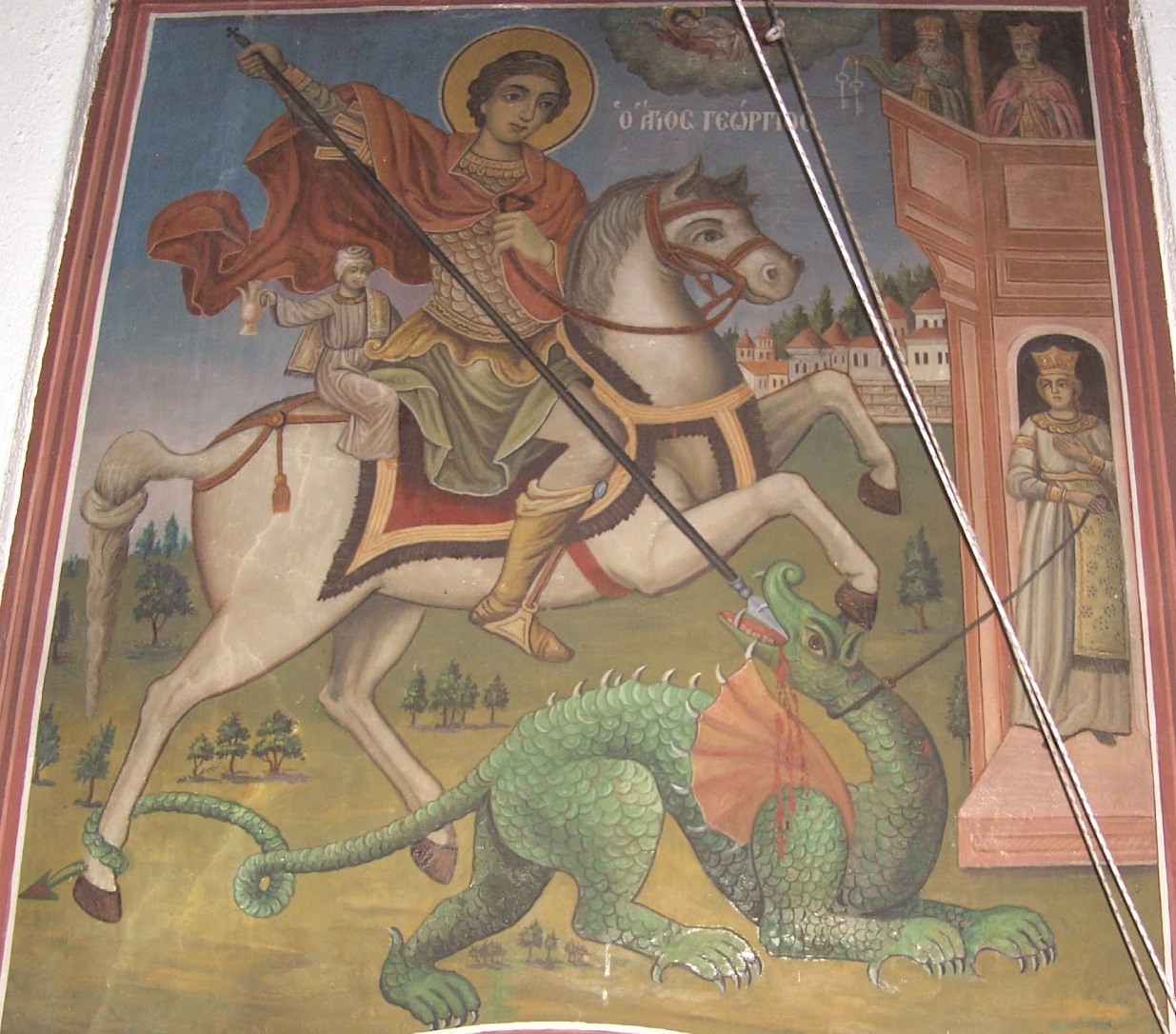
Saint George Fresco in Saint Seorge Church in Vamvakofyto

Vamvakofyto (Greek: Βαμβακόφυτο; Medieval Greek: Σαβίακον, Saviakon; Bulgarian: Савяк, Savyak) is a village in the municipal unit Sidirokastro, in the northern part of Serres regional unit, Greece.

Its altitude is 120 meters.
