= Theophilus Antecessor =

Theophilus Antecessor (Ancient Greek: Θεόφιλος Ἀντικήνσωρ; fl. 6th century) was a Byzantine jurist, translator from Latin to Greek and teacher.

== Biography ==
Theophilus lived in Constantinople during the 6th century. Nothing is known of his life except that he was a comes sacri consistorii (member of the Crown Council) and professor of law at the University of Constantinople (ἀντικήνσωρ). He is last mentioned in AD 533.

== Works ==
Theophilus, working with Tribonian and Dorotheus, authored the Institutiones, the first section of the Corpus Juris Civilis, by authority and order of the emperor Justinian. He also was heavily involved in the compilation of the Codex vetus and the Digesta.

Const. Tanta also informs that he was the compiler of a Greek paraphrase of the Institutiones as well as the indices to at least the first 19 volumes (out of 50) of the Digesta.

His paraphrase is the only juridical work in Greek from the times of Justinian to have survived almost in its entirety.

== Bibliography ==
- Lokin, J.H.A.; Meijering, Roos; Stolte, Bernard H.; van der Wal, Nicolaas, eds. (2010). Theophili Antecessoris Paraphrasis Institutionum. Translated by Murison, Alexander Falconer. Groningen: Chimaira. ISBN 9789076892191.
