= Belchior Febos =

Portuguese jurist

Belchior Febos, also called Phoebus (died 1632) was one of the leading Portuguese jurists of his time.

In the early 17th century, Febos practiced law before Portugal's supreme civil and administrative courts, the Casa da Suplicação and the Desembargo da Paço. His principal work, the two-volume Decisiones Senatus Regnus Lusitaniae (1619), a compilation of commented decisions of the supreme courts, was among Portugal's most significant contributions to the European scholarly discourse about the ius commune.
