= Anastasius of Samaria =

Byzantine official

Anastasius (Greek: Αναστάσιος) was a Byzantine official, active in the reign of Justin II (r. 565–578). He held the positions of magister officiorum and quaestor sacri palatii. He seems to have died by the mid-570s.

Anastasius was a native of Samaria, as recorded by John of Ephesus. The same primary source calls Anastasius both a Samaritan and a Palestinian, presumably as geographic terms.

He is first mentioned as the subject of a panegyric composed by Flavius Cresconius Corippus. The poem is dated to late 565 or early 566. It describes Anastasius as holding the offices of magister officiorum and quaestor sacri palatii. This indicates that Anastasius had been appointed by Justin II, soon after the latter rose to the throne (14–15 November 565). He was presumably a loyal supporter or political ally of Justin. He probably succeeded Constantine as quaestor and Peter the Patrician as magister. Both men were long-serving ministers of Justinian I (r. 527–565) and Justin would want to replace them with his own loyalists.

By the time Corippus wrote In laudem Justini minoris, his 566 panegyric in honour of Justin II, Anastasius had been replaced as magister officiorum. His immediate successor was apparently Theodore "Kondocheres" ("Shorthand"), a son of Peter the Patrician. On the other hand, Anastasius still held the position of quaestor into the 570s. Corripus keeps mentioning him as a quaestor in the second panegyric. John of Ephesus mentions him as the active quaestor in 571/572.

Corippus credits Anastasius with measures aimed to help the Praetorian prefecture of Africa. John of Ephesus lists him as one of the officials opposed to Justin's amendments to the edict of the faith, c. 570. The amendments were considered favourable to the Monophysites and scandalised the Chalcedonians. His opposition to the amendments and John criticizing him as a false Christian, probably means that Anastasius himself was a Chalcedonian. The narrative of John contains a tale where Justin terrorizes Anastasius. The emperor reportedly ordered the quaestor to have twenty copies of the amended text by nightfall, or else face execution by decapitation.

In 571, Anastasius was sent by Justin to discuss reconciliation terms with the monophysites. Their representatives refused to co-operate and Anastasius reported the failure to Justin. This ended the brief pro-monophysite period of Justin. On 22 March, 571, Justin started a new persecution of the monophysites. Anastasius was prominent among the senators conducting trials of monophysite bishops in 571 and 572. The trials took place at Constantinople, with most of the accused sentenced to exile. He co-operated closely with John Scholasticus, Patriarch of Constantinople. John of Ephesus accuses Anastasius of being in the Patriarch's payroll.

A particularly hostile chapter of John of Ephesus alleges that Anastasius was a crypto-pagan, struggling to prevent the Christian Church from ever unifying. Anastasius' constant harassment of monophysites probably explains the hostility of the historian. John of Ephesus cites that when Samaritans came under religious persecution, Anastasius bribed officials to drop the charges. A minority of modern historians have suggested that Anastasius could have been an adherent of Samaritanism, posing as a Christian. Most consider him a genuine Chalcedonian, the charges against him being purely political.

Anastasius reportedly suffered a seizure during "the day of the adoration of the Holy Cross". This could have been a Good Friday. Both 15 April 572 (Good Friday, 572) and 7 April 573 (Good Friday, 573) have been suggested as the date of the event. This sign of failing health was a precursor to his death, taking place "a year and a half" later. By 575, Anastasius seems to have died.

== Sources ==
- Martindale, John R.; Jones, A.H.M.; Morris, John (1992), The Prosopography of the Later Roman Empire, Volume III: AD 527–641, Cambridge University Press, ISBN 0-521-20160-8
