= José Anastácio da Cunha =

Portuguese mathematician (1744–1787)

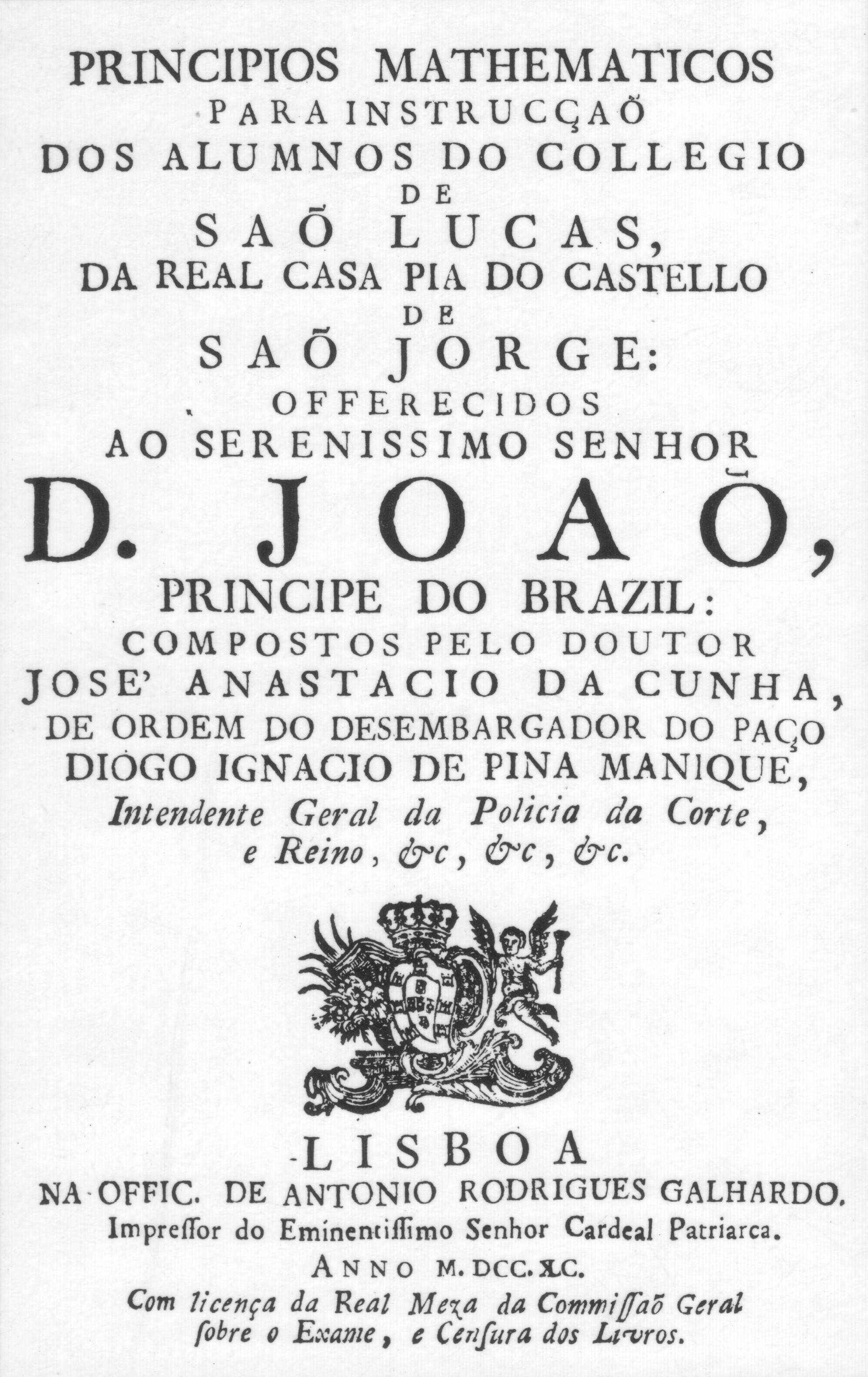
Principios Mathematicos

José Anastácio da Cunha (11 May 1744 – 1 January 1787) was a Portuguese mathematician and educator whose work anticipated nineteenth‑century developments in analysis by several decades. He is best known for his work on the theory of equations, algebraic analysis, plain and spherical trigonometry, analytical geometry, and differential calculus.

== Early life and education ==
Anastácio da Cunha was born in Lisbon to a humble family and received his early schooling in grammar, rhetoric and logic from the Oratorian fathers at the Casa das Necessidades. By his own account, he pursued physics and mathematics por sua curiosidade e sem mestre (out of curiosity and without a teacher). In 1762, during the closing stages of the Seven Years' War, he secured a commission as a lieutenant in the Portuguese artillery. His mathematical reputation led the Marquês de Pombal to appoint him to the newly created chair of geometry at the University of Coimbra in October 1773. After a period of imprisonment by the Portuguese Inquisition for alleged heterodox opinions, he was pardoned and in 1781 took up the task of organising mathematics instruction at the Real Casa Pia in Lisbon.

== Mathematical works ==
Cunha's principal work, the Princípios Matemáticos, was issued in Lisbon from 1782 and published complete in 1790. Divided into twenty‑one "books", it covered Euclidean geometry, arithmetic, algebra, differential and integral calculus, infinite series and the calculus of variations in a strict axiomatic sequence of definitions, propositions and mathematical proofs. In Book IX he introduced the notion of a convergent series—one in which the remainder beyond any given term can be made arbitrarily small—mirroring the modern Cauchy criterion by defining the sum of infinitely many terms as the finite limit approached by its partial sums. He then defined exponentiation and logarithm via infinite series, extending these definitions to complex exponents and deriving Euler's formula e^{i_z_} = cos z + i sin z. In Book XV he gave an analytic definition of the differential by treating it as a linear approximation whose error term vanishes as the increment becomes infinitesimal, a clear forerunner of the modern derivative concept.

== Legacy ==
Although Cunha's work remained little known in his lifetime, his Princípios Matemáticos was translated into French in 1811 and drew attention—sometimes critical—in contemporary European journals. Carl Friedrich Gauss praised his definition of logarithm in correspondence, and modern historians regard him as a pioneer in rigorously grounding analysis well before Cauchy's French: Cours d'Analyse of 1821.

== Reception ==
In the years following its posthumous publication, Princípios Matemáticos drew notice across Europe. A French translation in 1811 prompted reviews in France, Germany and Britain, and in March–April 1816 a further recension appeared in the Italian Giornale di Fisica, Chimica, Storia Naturale, Medicina ed Arti. Although published anonymously, this Italian review is now attributed to Vincenzo Brunacci, who commended Cunha's "robust and fervid" intellect and the elegance of his demonstrations—for instance, the factorisation of $x^n \pm a^n$. Brunacci did suggest that the first three books could benefit from smoother pedagogical links and questioned the dependence of arithmetic on geometric axioms. Overall, however, he concluded that the volume "is very valuable" and bears witness to Cunha's ingenuity

Brunacci paid particular attention to Cunha's treatment of fluxions—his term for infinitesimal increments—which he found fundamentally equivalent to the Lagrangian differential then coming into vogue. He observed that, despite Cunha's more geometric language, the fluxion behaved exactly as the first term in the power series expansion of a function's increment, foreshadowing modern notions of derivative. This endorsement from a leading Italian mathematician of the Napoleonic era underlines the work's forward‑looking rigour at a time when European analysis was only just moving towards the ε–δ definitions later formalised by Cauchy.
