= Anastasios Zarkadas =

Greek professional footballer

Personal information
- Full name: Anastasios Zarkadas
- Date of birth: 11 April 1994 (age 32)
- Place of birth: Greece
- Height: 1.79 m (5 ft 10 in)
- Position: Midfielder

Team information
- Current team: AO Karavas

Youth career
- Anagennisi Stanos
- 2010–2014: Panetolikos

Senior career*
| Years | Team | Apps | (Gls) |
| 2014–2016 | Panetolikos | 1 | (0) |
| 2015 | → Fokikos F.C. (loan) | 8 | (0) |
| 2016–2018 | A.E. Mesolonghi | | |
| 2018– | AO Karavas | | |
- * Club domestic league appearances and goals as of 15:11, 29 November 2015 (UTC)

Anastasios Zarkadas (Greek: Αναστάσιος Ζαρκάδας; born 4 November 1994) is a Greek professional footballer who plays for AO Karavas.

== Career ==
Zarkadas began his career with the youth club of Panetolikos F.C. He signed his first professional contract in August 2014, but made no appearances with the first team. He spent the second half of the 2014–2015 on loan to Fokikos F.C. making 8 appearances in the Greek Football League.

He made his Panetolikos debut on 29 November 2015, coming in as a substitute in the game against AEK.
