= Jean-Jacques Gaspard Foelix =

Jean-Jacques Gaspard Foelix (1791–1853) was a French jurist and the founder of the science of comparative law in France.

After studies in Koblenz, Foelix practiced law in Paris, a profession which he saw mainly as a means to engage in his study of European legislation. His reputation as a scholar of comparative law rested chiefly on his 1833 founding of the journal Revue du droit français et étranger. He wrote about 150 articles for the journal, many of which were concerned with German law.

In 1838, the University of Freiburg awarded him an honorary doctorate for his efforts to mediate between the legal cultures of France and Germany.
