= Enantiophanes =

Byzantine jurist of uncertain date

Enantiophanes was a Byzantine jurist whose exact identity is uncertain. The period when the jurist lived who bears this name has also been a subject of much dispute among scholars.

== Identity ==
John Thomas Graves, writing in 1870, states the following:

Cujacius, in his Preface to the 60th book of the Basilica, prefixed to the 7th volume of Fabrot's edition of that work, supposes Enantiophanes to be the assumed name of a Graeco-Roman jurist, who wrote peri enantiophanôn, or concerning the explanation of apparent legal inconsistencies. Suarez (Notit. Basil. § 35) says that Photius, in his Nomocanon, mentions having written such a work. Fabricius, in a note upon the work of Suarez (which is inserted in the Bibliotheca Graeca,) states that Balsamo, in his Preface to the Nomocanon of Photius, refers to Enantiophanes. Assemanni, however, shows (Bibl. Jur. Orient. ii. 18, p. 389) that there is no reason for attributing a work peri enantiophanôn to Photius, that there is no passage in his Nomocanon relating to such a work, and that the sentence in which Balsamo is supposed by Fabricius to refer to Enantiophanes has no such meaning. The Ennantiophanôn biblion is cited in Basil. v. p. 726. Enantiophanes (Basil. vi. p. 250) cites his own book de Legatis et Mortis Causa Donationibus, and the Paragraphê, or annotation, of Enantiophanes is cited in Basil. vii. p. 496.

== Period ==
As to Enantiophanes's lifetime, Graves relates what follows:

Reiz (ad Theophilum, pp. 1234, 1236) thinks that Enantiophanes wrote before the composition of the Basilica, and marks his name with an asterisk as an ascertained contemporary of Justinian. In Basil. iii. p. 318 Enantiophanes calls Stephanus his master; but this is by no means conclusive. Assemanni, misled by Papadopoli, thinks that the Stephanus here meant lived under Alexius Comnenus, and was not the Stephanus who was one of the compilers of Justinian's Digest. The contemporary of Justinian, however, was undoubtedly the person intended; but Stephanus was one of those early Graeco-Roman jurists who, like Domninus, Patricius, and Cyrillus, are thought by Zachariae (Anecdota, p. viii.) to have been called by subsequent jurists masters or teachers in a general sense. (Compare Basil. 11. tit. i. s. 67, sch. ed. Heimbach, i. p. 646.) Zachariae places Enantiophanes among the jurists who lived before the time of Basileius Macedo (Hist. Jur. Gr. Rom. Deiius, § 20. 1, 2.) That he lived before the formation of the present text of the Basilica, appears from his being several times named in the text itself, as in iii. p. 258, where he cites Theophilus; ii. p. 560, where he cites the Code of Justinian; i. 99, where he cites the Novells of Justinian. According to the Scholium on the Basilica (ii. p. 548, ed. Heimbach), he seems to have written notes upon the Digest. That he was alive after the death of Justinian appears from Basil. iii. p. 230 (ed. Heimbach), where he cites a Novell of Justin. On the other hand, Assemanni thinks that he wrote after the composition of the Basilica, which, in the Scholium, Basil. i. p. 262, he appears to cite; but it is very likely that here, as in many other places, that which was originally a citation from the Digest has been subsequently changed for convenience into a reference to the Basilica. In Basil. iii. p. 440, he cites Gregorius Doxapater, whom Pohl (followed by Zachariae), on the supposed authority of Montfaucon, places in the first half of the 12th century; but we have shown that there is no ground for identifying Gregorius Doxapater with the Doxapater mentioned by Montfaucon. An eminent jurist of the time of Justinian is frequently cited in the Basilica, and in the Scholia on that work by the appellation of the Anonymous. This writer composed an Index or abridgment of the Novells of Justinian, and was the author of Paratitla (a comparison of parallel passages) in the Digest. To this work the treatise on apparently discordant passages would form a natural sequel; and Mortrenil (Histoire du Droil Byzantin, i. p. 296) makes it probable that Enantiophanes and the Anonymous were the same persons; for in Basil. vi. p. 251 Schol., a passage is ascribed to Enantiophanes, which, in Basil. vi. p. 260, Schol., is attributed to the Anonymous. Biener (Geschichte der Novellen Justinians, p. 56) threw out the conjecture, that the Anonymous was no other than Julianus, the author of the Latin Epitome of the Novells; and Zachariae (Anecdota, p. 204–7) attempts to establish this conjecture. Mortreuil seems disposed to identify the three. In order to facilitate investigation, we subjoin a list (formed from Reiz and Fabricius) of passages in the Basilica where the name of Enantiophanes occurs: Basil. i. pp. 70, 99, 100, 109, 260, 408, 262, 265, 266, ii. pp. 540, 560, 609, 610, 628, iii. pp. 43, 170, 258, 318, 393, 394, 412, v. p. 726, vi. 250, 251, 260, vii. 496, 499, 565, 640, 641. (Heimbach, de Basil. Orig. pp. 76–79.)
