= Walter Moraes =

Brazilian jurist and philosopher (1934–1997)

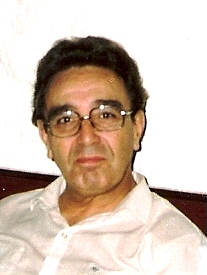

Walter Moraes (13 November 1934 in Catanduva, São Paulo, Brazil – 17 November 1997 in Diadema, São Paulo), was a Brazilian jurist, Catholic thinker, professor of the University of São Paulo Faculty of Law, judge at the High Court of São Paulo. Studied in the minor seminary of the Divine Word Missionaries. He married Sonia dos Santos Moraes in 1959, with whom he had two children. Graduated in Law and Philosophy by the University of São Paulo. He began his career as Judge in municipalities of Casa Branca, Quatá and Campos do Jordão. Pioneered many fields of juridical science in Brazil including copyright, inheritance and family law. Reformer of the Brazilian Children's code together with Prof. Antonio Chaves. Important supporter and theorist of the Brazilian pro-life movement. Spoke against legal abortion in his famous conference "The Farce of Legal Abortion", given in the Chamber of Deputies of Brazil on 24 September 1997, less than two months before his death.

Secretary of the Inter-American Copyright Institute , director of the Revista Interamericana de Direito Intelectual (Inter-American Journal of Intellectual Law), Brazilian correspondent of the European Intellectual Property Review member of Societé de Legislation Comparée, Internationale Gesellschaft für Urheberrecht, International Association of Family Right and Inheritance, Instituto dos Advogados de São Paulo (Lawyer's Institute of São Paulo), Instituto Brasileiro de Propriedade Intelectual (Brazilian Copyright Institute).

Author of many books and articles on adoption law, copyright, Civil Society, Philosophy of Right and abortion: "Adoption and Truth" (Adoção e Verdade), "Artists Interpreters and Performers" (Artistas Intérpretes e Executantes), "Strict Civil Society" (Sociedade Civil Estrita), "General Theory of Legitimate Inheritance" (Teoria Geral da Sucessão Legítima), "Thomist Conception of Person" (Concepção Tomista de Pessoa), "The Problem of Judicial Authorization for Abortion" (O problema da autorização judicial para o aborto).
