= Alice Leonor das Neves Costa =

Alice Leonor das Neves Costa is a judge. She is the Presidente de tribunal colectivo under the Tribunal Judicial de Base, a court within the judicial structure in Macau.

Preceded by TBD	President of the Tribunal Judicial de Base; 1999-	Succeeded by incumbent
