= Anastasius of Antioch =

Anastasius of Antioch may refer to:

- Anastasius of Antioch (martyr) (died 302), Christian martyr
- Anastasius I of Antioch, called "the Sinaite", Patriarch of Antioch in 561–571 and 593–599
- Anastasius II of Antioch, Patriarch of Antioch in 599–609
- Anastasius III of Antioch, Patriarch of Antioch in 620–628
