= Tam Hio Wa =

Macau judge

Tam Hio Wa(譚曉華) is the Presidente dos Tribunais de Primeira Instancia, a court within the judiciary of Macau.

Preceded by TBD	President of the Tribunais de Primeira Instancia; 1999-	Succeeded by incumbent
