= Lai Kin Hong =

President of the Tribunal de Segunda Instancia
- Incumbent
- Assumed office 1999

Personal details
- Born: Macau
- Occupation: judge
- Profession: judge

Lai Kin Hong(賴健雄) is the President of the Tribunal de Segunda Instancia, an appellate court within the judiciary of Macau.

Mr. Justice Lai is also a member of the Conselho dos Magistrados Judiciais.

Preceded by TBD	President of the Tribunais de Segunda Instancia; 1999-	Succeeded by incumbent
