= Anastasios Dentsas =

Greek footballer

Tasos Dentsas
Personal information
- Full name: Anastasios Dentsas
- Date of birth: 19 March 1982 (age 44)
- Place of birth: Vamvakofyto, Greece
- Height: 1.82 m (6 ft 0 in)
- Position: Midfielder

Team information
- Current team: Panserraikos U17 (manager)

Senior career*
Years	Team	Apps	(Gls)
1997–2002	Panserraikos	48	(1)
2002–2006	OFI	99	(2)
2006–2007	Iraklis	15	(0)
2007–2012	Panetolikos	110	(8)
2012–2013	Platanias	33	(1)
2013–2015	Ethnikos Gazoros	24	(0)
2015–2017	Kavala	0	(0)
2017–2019	Apollon Paralimnio	0	(0)

International career
2003	Greece U21	6	(0)

Managerial career
- 2019–2023: Panserraikos U19
- 2023–: Panserraikos U17
- * Club domestic league appearances and goals as of 1:03, 31 October 2015 (UTC)

Anastasios 'Tasos' Dentsas (Greek: Αναστάσιος 'Τάσος' Δέντσας; born 19 March 1982) is a Greek retired footballer and coach. He has been capped with the Greek U-21 squad.

== Club career ==
Born in Vamvakofyto, Dentsas began playing football for local side Panserraikos in the Beta Ethniki. He played for OFI and Iraklis in the Super League Greece. In the summer of 2007, Dentsas joined Panetolikos, which was playing in the Gamma Ethniki at the time, and was an integral part and a captain of the squads that led Panetolikos to the Super League Greece in the summer of 2011. On 2 January 2012, he was released from Panetolikos. On the same day, his transfer to Platanias was announced.
