= Anastacio Reyes =

Mexican basketball player (born 1949)

Personal information
- Nationality: Mexican
- Born: 19 November 1949 (age 75)

Sport
- Sport: Basketball

Anastacio Reyes (born 19 November 1949) is a Mexican basketball player. He competed in the men's tournament at the 1976 Summer Olympics.
