= Milea, Ioannina =

Milea Μηλέα (Greek) Ameru (Aromanian)
- Municipal unit
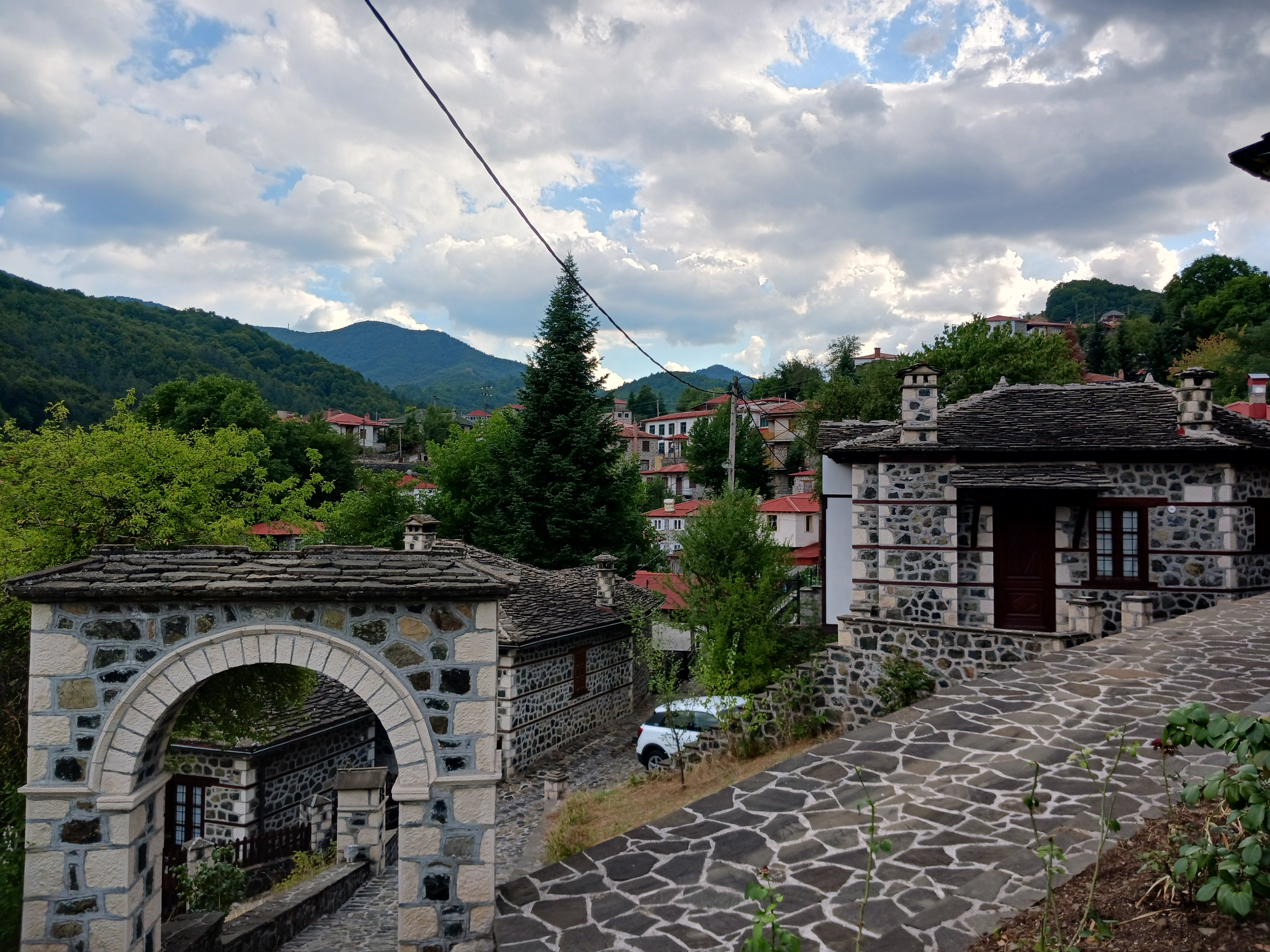
- View of Milea

- Location within the regional unit

- Location within Greece
- Coordinates: 39°51′N 21°14′E
- Country: Greece
- Administrative region: Epirus
- Regional unit: Ioannina
- Municipality: Metsovo

Area
  - Municipal unit: 54.556 km^{2} (21.064 sq mi)
- Elevation: 1,160 m (3,810 ft)

Population (2021)
  - Municipal unit: 311
  - Municipal unit density: 5.70/km^{2} (14.8/sq mi)
- Time zone: UTC+2 (EET)
  - Summer (DST): UTC+3 (EEST)
- Postal code: 442 00
- Area code: +30-2656
- Vehicle registration: ΙΝ

Milea (Greek: Μηλέα; Aromanian: Ameru) is a village and a former community in the Ioannina regional unit, Epirus, Greece. Since the 2011 local government reform it is part of the municipality Metsovo, of which it is a municipal unit. The 2021 census recorded 311 residents in Milea. The community of Milea covers an area of 54.556 km^{2}. Milea is 15 km away from Metsovo.

== Name ==
In Aromanian, the village name Ameru is derived from the Aromanian masculine noun mer, plural merou, meaning 'apple tree', with the development of an initial a- sound. Local tradition attributes the name to an apple tree located near the village inn. In Greek, the village name is Milia meaning 'apple tree'.

== Demographics ==
Milia has an Aromanian population and is an Aromanian speaking village. In the early 21st century, elderly people were bilingual in the community language and Greek, whereas younger residents under 40 might have understood the community language but did not use it.

== See also ==
- List of settlements in the Ioannina regional unit
- Valley of Millia
