= Anastasios Tsonis =

Greek-American atmospheric scientist

Anastasios A. Tsonis
- Born: Elefsis, Greece
- Education: B.S., Aristotelian University (1976), Ph.D., McGill University (1982)
- Scientific career
- Fields: Atmospheric science, mathematics
- Institutions: University of Wisconsin–Milwaukee
- Thesis: The evaluation of extrapolation schemes for the growth or decay of rain area and applications (1982)

Anastasios Tsonis is a Greek-American atmospheric scientist and an emeritus professor at the University of Wisconsin-Milwaukee. He is also an adjunct scientist at the Hydrologic Research Center in San Diego, California.

== Education ==
Tsonis was born in the Greek city of Elefsis. He received his BS from Aristotelian University in 1976 and his PhD from McGill University in 1982.

== Academic career ==
After receiving his PhD, Tsonis became a postdoctoral fellow at the Atmospheric Environmental Service in Canada from 1982–1985. He then joined the University of Wisconsin–Milwaukee.

== Research ==
Tsonis is the author of more than 130 peer reviewed publications and nine books. Tsonis's career began focusing on mathematical models of atmospheric processes, such as vertical wind speeds.

Tsonis has performed research pertaining to global warming, especially natural influences on global temperatures. In 2009, Tsonis, with Kyle Swanson, published a paper reporting that natural climate shifts are superimposed on the warming trend observed during the 20th century. They concluded that "a break in the global mean temperature trend from the consistent warming over the 1976/77–2001/02 period may have occurred." The authors also argued that "there are times when different types of natural variation in the climate synchronize, which shifts the climate to a new state", and that this may explain the supposed cessation of warming that, according to him, began in 2001 or 2002. They contend that this shift changed the climate state from "warming" to "cooling". Tsonis has argued that natural factors, especially ocean currents, may contribute more to climate change than human activity, and that the Earth is "now in a period of cooling that could last up to fifty years." In 2013, he reiterated his view that this cooling trend was occurring, and might continue for the next 15 years. That year, shortly after the IPCC Fifth Assessment Report was released, he also criticized the reliability of climate models, saying that they "don't agree with each other – and they don't agree with reality."
