= Anastasius (jurist) =

Anastasius (Greek: Ἀναστάσιος) was a Graeco-Roman jurist, ostensibly from the city of Dara, living in the 5th or 6th century CE. He was written of as an interpreter of the Roman compendium of laws known as the Digest. He is cited in the later Basilika, in which, on one occasion, his opinion is placed in opposition to that of Stephanus of Byzantium. Aside from this, there is little evidence in his surviving fragments to guess at the century in which he lived or suppose him to have been a contemporary of the Byzantine Emperor Justinian I (r. 527–565). Classical scholar Reitz, however, considered it certain that he was so, and accordingly marked his name with an asterisk in the list of jurists appended to his edition of Theophilus. The name "Anastasius" is so common that it is difficult to identify him with others possessing the name, but it may be stated that among more than forty persons mentioned with the name, the scholar Johann Albert Fabricius mentions one who was Roman consul in 517. Procopius relates that Anastasius, who had quelled an attempt to usurp imperial power in Anastasius's native city of Dara, and had acquired a high reputation for intelligence, was sent on an embassy to the Persian shah Khosrau I in 540. This Anastasius was at first detained against his will by Khosrau, but was sent back to Justinian, after Khosrau had destroyed the city of Sura.
