= Anastasios Bakirtzis =

Greek professor of electrical and computer engineering

Anastasios Bakirtzis is a Professor of electrical and computer engineering at the Aristotle University of Thessaloniki, Greece. He was named Fellow of the Institute of Electrical and Electronics Engineers (IEEE) in 2015 for contributions to optimization of power systems operation and scheduling.

Bakirtzis was born in 1956 in Serres, Greece. He attended the National Technical University of Athens where he got his diploma in mechanical and electrical engineering in 1979. He then immigrated to the United States where he attended Georgia Tech, graduating with M.S.E.E. and Ph.D. degrees in 1981 and 1984 respectively. After graduation, Bakirtzis became a consultant to Southern Company in Atlanta, Georgia and in 1986 joined the Department of Electrical and Computer Engineering of the Aristotle University of Thessaloniki. Bakirtzis served as head of the Division of Electric Energy of the ECE Department of the Aristotle University of Thessaloniki from 1997 to 1999 and from 1999 to 2004 served as Deputy Chairman of the Department of Energy Resource Management of the same institution. In 2008, he returned to the post of the head of the Division of Electric Energy, serving as such until 2010.
