= Anastasios Karakoutsis =

Greek footballer (born in 1983)

Tasos Karakoutsis
Personal information
- Full name: Anastasios Karakoutsis
- Date of birth: 29 October 1983 (age 42)
- Place of birth: Giannitsa, Greece
- Height: 1.85 m (6 ft 1 in)
- Position: Goalkeeper

Youth career
- 2001: Paniliakos

Senior career*
Years	Team	Apps	(Gls)
2001–2007	Paniliakos	36	(0)
2007–2008	Polykastro	24	(0)
2008–2012	Pierikos	48	(0)
2012–2013	Niki Volos	7	(0)
2013–2015	AEL	0	(0)
2015	Panargiakos		
2015–2016	Ermis Zoniana		
2016–2017	AE Alexandreia		
2018	Aris Palaiochori		
2019	Aris Palaiochori		
- * Club domestic league appearances and goals as of 9 December 2014

Anastasios "Tasos" Karakoutsis (Greek: Αναστάσιος "Τάσος" Καρακούτσης; born 29 October 1983) is a Greek former footballer who played as a goalkeeper.

== Career ==
Karakoutsis comes from Krya Vrysi, Pella, and has previously played in Paniliakos, Polykastro, Pierikos and Niki Volos.
