= Anastasios Karagiozis =

Greek footballer

Tasos Karagiozis
Personal information
- Full name: Anastasios Karagiozis
- Date of birth: 20 June 1997 (age 29)
- Place of birth: Katerini, Greece
- Height: 1.95 m (6 ft 5 in)
- Position: Goalkeeper

Team information
- Current team: Pannaxiakos

Youth career
- Levadiakos

Senior career*
Years	Team	Apps	(Gls)
2015–2016	Levadiakos	0	(0)
2016–2019	Aiginiakos	34	(0)
2019–2020	Volos	3	(0)
2021	Niki Volos	6	(0)
2021–2022	Ierapetra	22	(0)
2022–2024	Kozani	42	(0)
2024–2025	Ethnikos Neo Keramidi	21	(0)
2025–2026	Panargiakos	19	(0)
2026–	Pannaxiakos		
- * Club domestic league appearances and goals as of 15 February 2026

Anastasios "Tasos" Karagiozis (Greek: Αναστάσιος 'Τάσος' Καραγκιόζης; born 20 June 1997) is a Greek professional footballer who plays as a goalkeeper for Gamma Ethniki club Pannaxiakos.
