= Tasos Dimas =

Greek professional basketball player

Koropi
- Position: Shooting guard / small forward
- League: Greek B League

Personal information
- Born: April 10, 1988 (age 38) Thessaloniki, Greece
- Listed height: 6 ft 6 in (1.98 m)
- Listed weight: 205 lb (93 kg)

Career information
- NBA draft: 2010: undrafted
- Playing career: 2006–present

Career history
- 2006–2011: Megas Alexandros
- 2011–2016: Aris Thessaloniki
- 2013–2014: → Ikaroi Serron
- 2016–2017: Koropi
- 2017–present: Doxa Pefkon

Anastasios "Tasos" Dimas (alternate spelling: Tassos) (Greek: Αναστάσιος "Τάσος" Δήμας; born April 10, 1988) is a Greek professional basketball player. He is a 1.98 m (6 ft 6 in) tall shooting guard-small forward.

== Professional career ==
Dimas began playing basketball with the junior teams of Megas Alexandros Thessaloniki in 1998. In 2006, he moved up to the senior men's team of Megas Alexandros, and he played there from the 2006–07 season, through the 2010–11 season. With Megas Alexandros, Dimas first played in the Greek minors, playing in the 4th-tier level Greek C League, from 2006 to 2009, and then in his last two seasons with the club (2009–10 and 2010–11), he played in the 3rd-tier Greek B League.

Dimas signed with the professional level 1st-tier Greek Basket League club Aris, in 2011. He spent the 2011–12 and 2012–13 seasons with Aris. With Aris, he played for the first time in both the Greek first division and in the European 2nd-tier level EuroCup in 2011.

Dimas then spent the 2013–14 season playing in the Greek 2nd division with Ikaroi Serron on loan. He returned to Aris for the 2014–15 season.
