= Anastasios Nyfadopoulos =

Greek artist

- Αναστάσιος Νυφαδόπουλος
- Born: May 22, 1992 (age 34); Athens, Greece
- Known for: Visual art, contemporary art
- Website: www.nyfadopoulos.com

Anastasios Nyfadopoulos (Greek: Αναστάσιος Νυφαδόπουλος; born 22 May 1992) is a Greek interdisciplinary artist whose work is particularly known for exploring the themes of interconnectivity and perpetual change. He has exhibited his work in numerous exhibitions in Greece and abroad. One of his most notable works, the sculpture "Crisis", became known as the first public sculpture referring to the reverberations of the socio-economic crisis on humanity.

== Artworks ==
Nyfadopoulos has shown his work at exhibitions in various European countries, in particular in Greece, Spain and United Kingdom. In an interview given to the Greek newspaper Naftemporiki, Nyfadopoulos said: "Thousands of fibers intertwine together in my sculpture, creating an optimized single body. Any single fiber cannot withstand significant pressure, but thousands of fibers can, due to the synergy they create. The new body has new and superior properties than the sum of the parts. It is the same with us humans, and the realization of this by a critical mass will radically change humanity. With steady steps we move forward and up; every adversity we overcome with love. Love drives me to create the new right now."

=== Sculpture "Crisis" ===
The sculpture "Crisis", created by Nyfadopoulos, is the first public sculpture worldwide to refer to the reverberations of the socioeconomic crisis on humanity and the significant accelerating increase in the suicide rate in Greece since the beginning of the crisis, as reported by the Hellenic Statistical Authority. This is one of his most notable works. The artwork depicts a financial index sloping downwards, crashing its base, and a human figure on the index ready to jump. Two left-footed shoes on its base hint at the fall. Whether the human is jumping to end his life or to start a new one, depends on the observer. The sculpture is 6.8 meters long, 3.4 meters wide, and 3.7 meters high. It was made of modern materials such as carbon fibre.

Nyfadopoulos created the sculpture "Crisis" at the age of 22. He worked on the creation of this sculpture for 18 months. According to the artist, the sculpture "Crisis" can be interpreted in two main ways: negative and positive. The first interpretation is a public tribute to the people who committed suicide because of the crisis, while the second interpretation is that the man who is on the index can, amidst all the difficulties that surround and affect him, come out as a new man, and can be led to a "catharsis".

The sculpture was reported by major international media including the Associated Press, The Guardian and the Chinese News Agency Xihnua. In 2015, the British newspaper The Guardian compared the people of Greece, who are in financial trouble, to Nyfadopoulos's "dangling man, once again staring in to the abyss". The sculpture stands at the southern Athens municipality of Elliniko-Argyroupoli.

== Art showroom ==
In September 2021, Nyfadopoulos opened his art gallery, in Maroussi, Athens, Greece. The gallery is located at the same place where the artist opened his atelier in 2013 and created the sculpture "Crisis".

== Selected exhibitions ==
- 2021: Group Exhibition “Dynamic Silence” (Europe, United Kingdom, Brighton)
- 2021: Group Exhibition “Dream of” (Europe, Greece, Kifissia)
- 2021: Group Exhibition “MyheArt” (Europe, Greece, Athens)
- 2020: Group Exhibition “Retrospectiva” (Europe, Greece, Kifissia)
- 2019: Group Exhibition “Exposing Violence” (Kifissia, Greece)
- 2019: Duo Exhibition “Blue like Blue” (Europe, Greece, Kifissia)
- 2018: Group Exhibition “Mesogeios” (Europe, Greece, Piraeus)
- 2018: Group Exhibition of the Chamber of Fine Arts of Greece (Europe, Greece, Athens)
- 2018: Group Exhibition “Scenes from the past and the future” (Europe, Greece, Kifissia)
- 2018: Art Athina 2018 (Europe, Greece, Athens)
- 2017: “Refuge: in search of safety” (Europe, United Kingdom, Bath)
- 2017: Group Exhibition “Regard” (Europe, United Kingdom, London)
- 2016: Solo Exhibition “Blue. It is not from around here” (Europe, Greece, Athens)

== Awards ==
- 2018 Annual Global Arts Awards, Redline Artworks, United Kingdom

== See also ==
- Contemporary Greek art
- Modern Greek art
