= Egyptian Greeks =

Greek community in Egypt

Έλληνες της Αιγύπτου

Total population
- 200,000 (1920) 300,000+ (c. 1940) estimates vary between 7,000–60,000 (today)

Regions with significant populations
- Alexandria, Cairo

Languages
- Greek · Egyptian Arabic · French · English

Religion
- Greek Orthodox Patriarchate of Alexandria

Related ethnic groups
- African Greeks · Ethiopian Greeks, Sudanese Greeks · Roman Africans

The Egyptian Greeks, also known as Egyptiots (Greek: Αιγυπτιώτες, romanized: Eyiptiótes) or simply Greeks of Egypt (Greek: Έλληνες της Αιγύπτου, romanized: Éllines tis Eyíptou), are the ethnic Greek community in Egypt with a history dating back to the Hellenistic period. Historically concentrated in Alexandria, the community was one of the largest and most influential foreign populations in the country. Following the Egyptian revolution of 1952 and subsequent nationalization policies, the population declined significantly; however, a small community remains in Cairo and Alexandria today.

== Antiquity ==
Greeks have been present in Egypt since at least the 7th century BC. Herodotus visited ancient Egypt in the 5th century BC and claimed that the Greeks were one of the first groups of foreigners that ever lived there. Diodorus Siculus claimed that Rhodian Actis, one of the Heliadae, built the city of Heliopolis before the cataclysm; likewise the Athenians built Sais. Siculus reports that all the Greek cities were destroyed during the cataclysm, but the Egyptian cities including Heliopolis and Sais survived.

=== First historical colonies ===
According to Herodotus (ii. 154), King Psammetichus I (664–610 BC) established a garrison of foreign mercenaries at Daphnae, mostly Carians and Ionian Greeks.

In the 7th century BC, after the Greek Dark Ages from 1100 to 750, the city of Naucratis was founded in Ancient Egypt. It was located on the Canopic branch of the Nile river, 45 mi (72 km) from the open sea. It was the first and, for much of its early history, the only permanent Greek colony in Egypt; acting as a symbiotic nexus for the interchange of Greek and Egyptian art and culture.

At about the same time, the city of Heracleion, the closest to the sea, became an important port for Greek trade. It had a famous temple of Heracles. The city later sank into the sea, only to be rediscovered recently.

From the time of Psammetichus I onwards, Greek mercenary armies played an important role in some of the Egyptian wars. One such army was led by Mentor of Rhodes. Another such personage was Phanes of Halicarnassus.

=== Hellenistic times ===
==== Rule of Alexander the Great (332–323 BC) ====
Alexander the Great conquered Egypt at an early stage of his conquests. He respected the pharaonic religions and customs and he was proclaimed Pharaoh of Egypt. He established the city of Alexandria. After his death, in 323 BC, his empire was divided among his generals. Egypt was given to Ptolemy I Soter, whose descendants would establish Egypt's last royal dynasty. This dynasty was composed solely of ethnic Greeks and produced dynasts such as Cleopatra. Its capital was Alexandria. Ptolemy added legitimacy to his rule in Egypt by acquiring Alexander's body. He intercepted the embalmed corpse on its way to burial, brought it to Egypt, and placed it in a golden coffin in Alexandria. It would remain one of the famous sights of the town for many years, until probably destroyed in riots in the 3rd century AD.

==== The Ptolemaic Empire (323–30 BC) ====
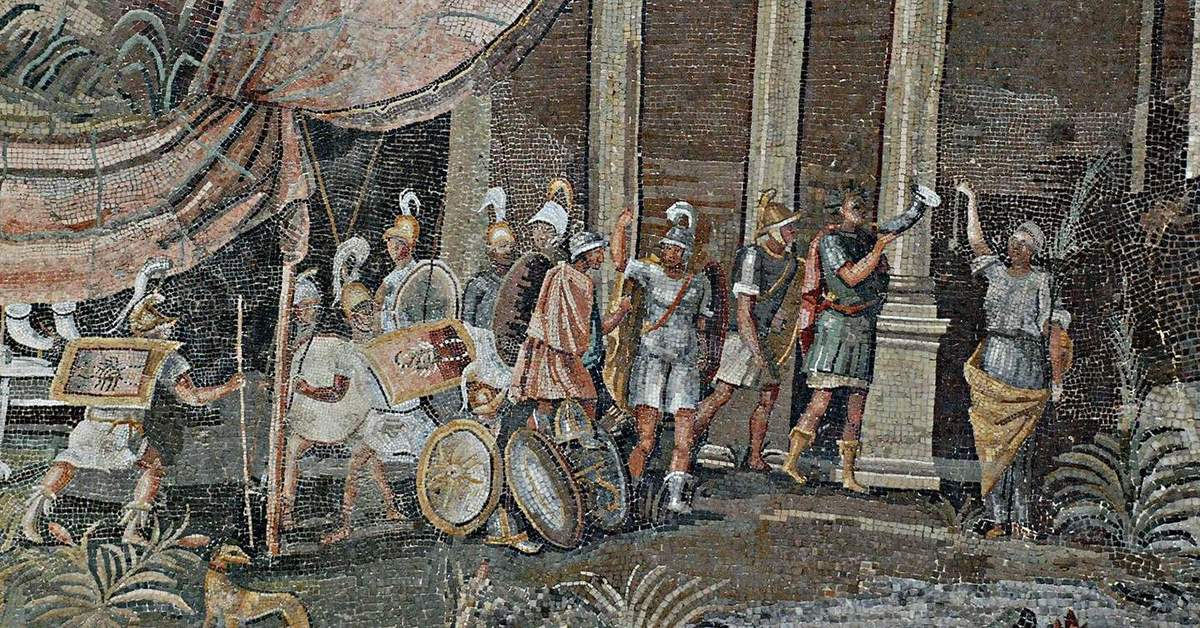
Ptolemaic soldiers in tunic, 100 BC, detail of the Nile mosaic of Palestrina

The initial objective of Ptolemy's reign was to establish firm and broad boundaries to his newly acquired kingdom. That led to almost continuous warfare against other leading members of Alexander's circle. When these conflicts were over, he was firmly in control of Egypt and had strong claims (disputed by the Seleucid dynasty) to Palestine. He called himself king of Egypt from 306 BC. By the time he abdicated in 285 BC, in favour of one of his sons, the Ptolemaic dynasty was secure. Ptolemy and his descendants showed respect to Egypt's most cherished traditions – those of religion – and turned them to their own advantage. At times Ptolemies held Cyprus, Cyrenaica and parts of Greece and Anatolia.

Alexandria became the centre of the Greek and Hellenistic world and the centre of international commerce, art and science. The Lighthouse of Alexandria was one of the Seven Wonders of the Ancient World while during the reign of Ptolemy II Philadelphus, the Library of Alexandria was the biggest library in the world until it was destroyed. The last Pharaoh was a Greek princess, Cleopatra VII, who took her own life in 30 BC, a year after the battle of Actium.

=== Roman and Byzantine Egypt ===
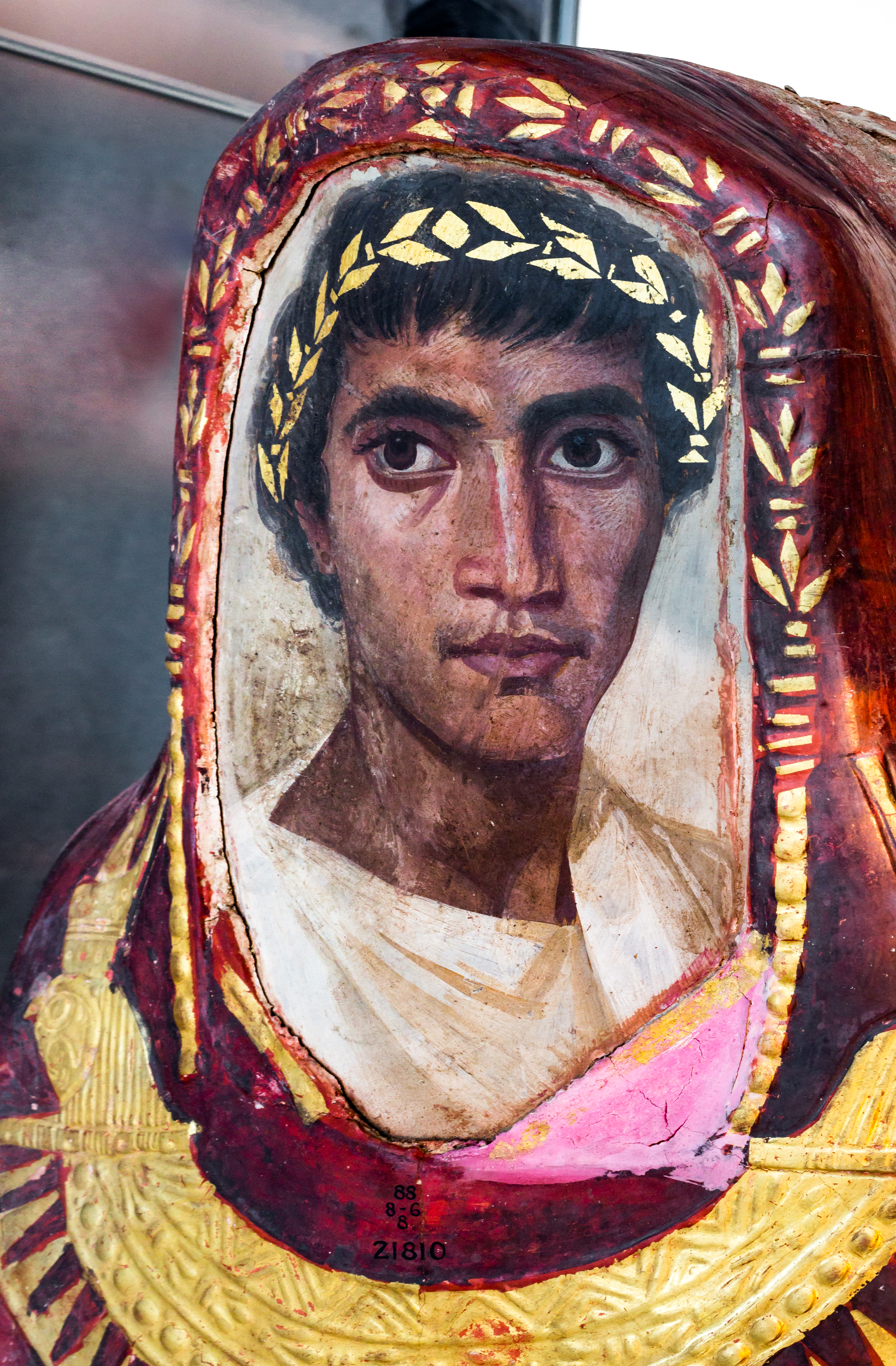
Mummy portrait of a youth with the Greek inscription "Artemidorus, Farewell", 2nd c. AD

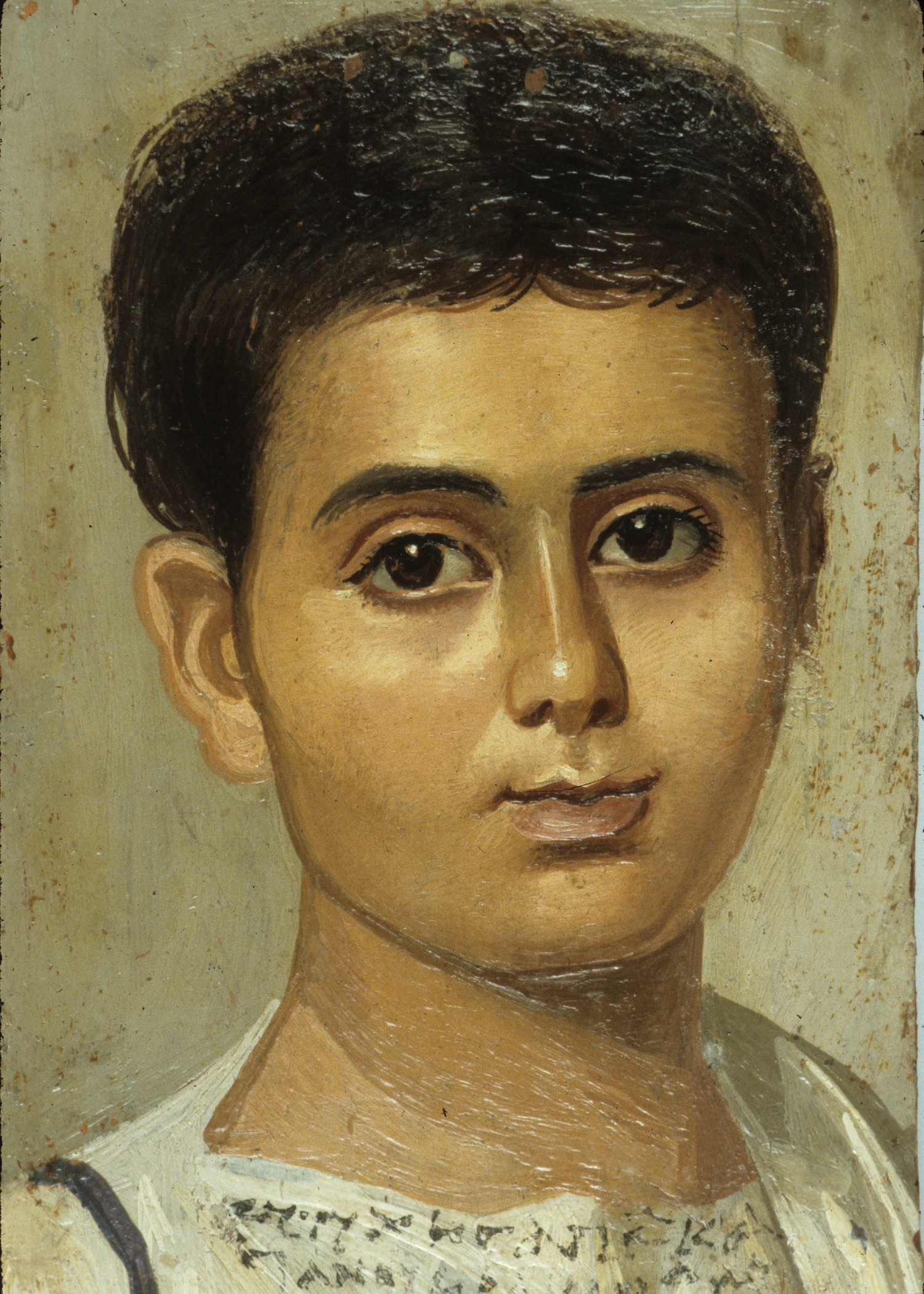
Mummy portrait of a boy named Eutyches (Εὐτυχής), 2nd c. AD

Under Greco-Roman rule, Egypt hosted several Greek settlements, mostly concentrated in Alexandria, but also in a few other cities, where Greek settlers lived alongside some seven to ten million native Egyptians. Faiyum's earliest Greek inhabitants were soldier-veterans and cleruchs (elite military officials) who were settled by the Ptolemaic kings on reclaimed lands. Native Egyptians also came to settle in Faiyum from all over the country, notably the Nile Delta, Upper Egypt, Oxyrhynchus and Memphis, to undertake the labor involved in the land reclamation process, as attested by personal names, local cults and recovered papyri.

==== Coptic Greeks ====
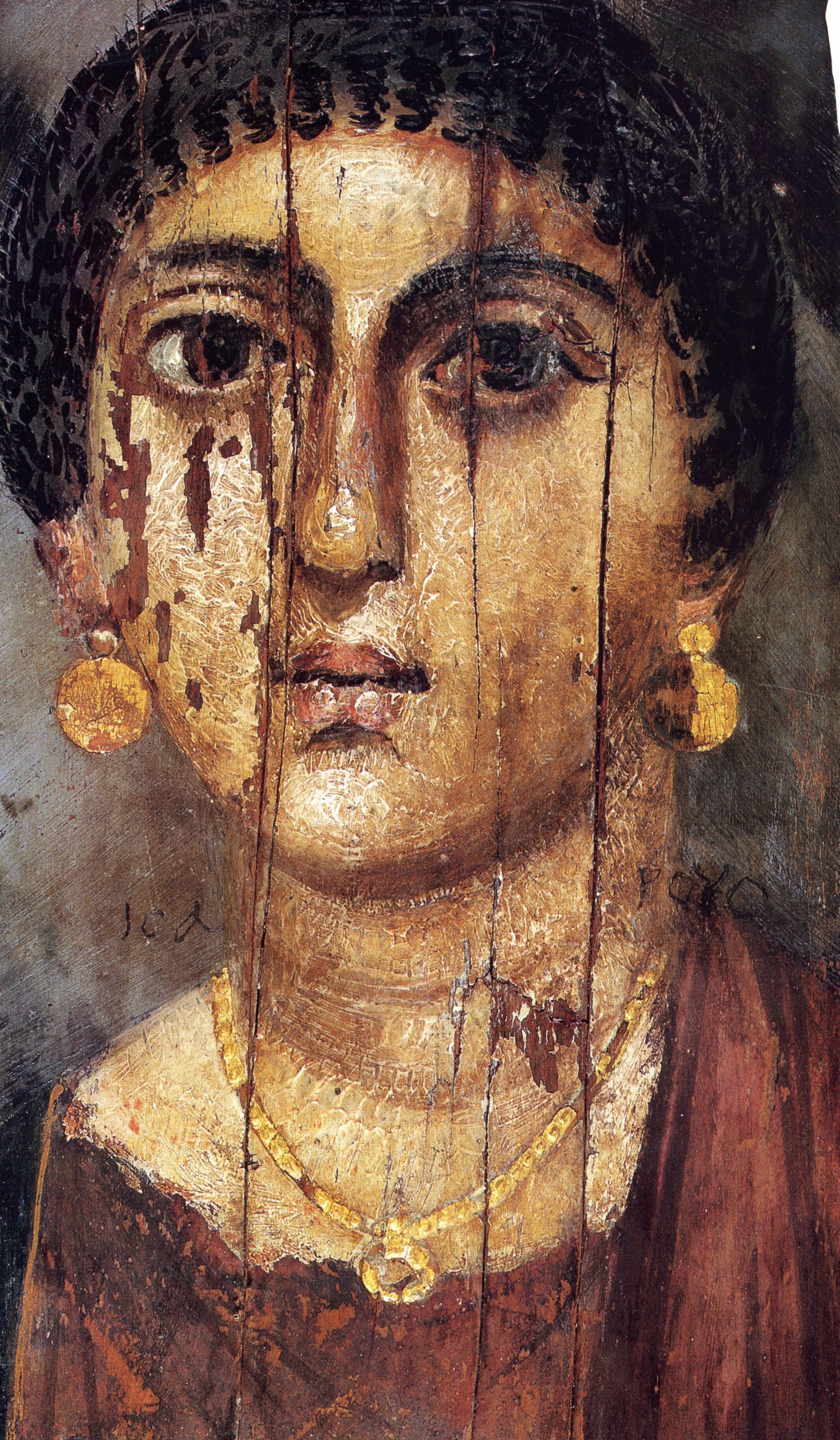
Mummy portrait of a woman named Isarous (Ἰσαροῦς), late 1st c. AD

It is estimated that as much as 30 percent of the population of Faiyum was Greek during the Ptolemaic period, with the rest being native Egyptians; the Faiyum mummy portraits reflect the complex synthesis of the predominant Egyptian culture and that of the elite Egyptian Greek minority in Faiyum.

By the Roman period, much of the "Greek" population of Faiyum was made up of either Hellenized Egyptians or people of mixed Egyptian-Greek origins, and by the time of Roman emperor Caracalla in the 2nd century AD, ethnic Egyptians could be distinguished from Egyptian Greeks only by their speech.

Egyptian Greek is the variety of Greek spoken in Egypt from antiquity until the Islamic conquest of Egypt in the 7th century. Egyptian Greek adopted many loanwords from Egyptian language; there was a great deal of intracommunity bilingualism in Egypt.

The following is an example of Egyptian Greek language, used in the Coptic Church:

ⲇⲟⲝⲁ ⲡⲁⲧⲣⲓ ⲕⲉ ⲩⲓⲱ: ⲕⲉ ⲁ̀ⲅⲓⲱ ⲡⲛⲉⲩⲙⲁⲧⲓ: ⲕⲉ ⲛⲩⲛ ⲕⲉ ⲁ̀ⲓ̀ ⲕⲉ ⲓⲥ ⲧⲟⲩⲥ ⲉⲱⲛⲁⲥ ⲧⲱⲛ ⲉ̀ⲱ̀ⲛⲱⲛ ⲁ̀ⲙⲏⲛ

Δόξα Πατρὶ κὲ Υἱῷ κὲ Ἁγίῳ Πνεύματι, κὲ νῦν κὲ ἀῒ κὲ ἰς τοὺς ἐῶνας τῶν ἐώνων. Ἀμήν.

Glory to the Father, to the Son, and to the Holy Spirit, both now and always, and unto the ages of ages. Amen.

The dental morphology of the Roman-period Faiyum mummies was also compared with that of earlier Egyptian populations, and was found to be "much more closely akin" to that of ancient Egyptians than to Greeks or other European populations. Victor J. Katz notes that "research in papyri dating from the early centuries of the common era demonstrates that a significant amount of intermarriage took place between the Greek and Egyptian communities".

== Medieval Islamic and Ottoman era ==
Greek culture and political influence continued and perhaps reached some of its most influential times during the Ottoman Caliphate, which witnessed many Ottoman sultans and pashas of Greek ancestry rule over the Ottoman Empire in general, and Egypt in particular. Other notable Greeks in Egypt during the Ottoman period included Damat Hasan Pasha from the Morea, a governor of Egypt. Raghib Pasha, born in Greece to Greek parents, served as prime minister of Egypt. During the Ottoman Caliphate, Pargalı Ibrahim Pasha, grand vizier to Suleiman the Magnificent from 1520 to 1566, is perhaps the best known.

At the end of the 18th century, Ottoman Egypt was home to a small community of Egyptian Greeks who numbered from under a thousand to 5000 people. At the time Egyptian Greeks were split into two distinct communities that rarely intermingled. The first was composed of Arabic speaking descendants of early Greek settlers and Greeks who immigrated to Egypt after 1517, most of whom were merchants. During the course of the War of the Second Coalition France occupied Egypt. The new French authorities established cordial relations with the Greek community. This resulted in the recruitment of Greek mercenaries who once served the Mamluks. On 27 June 1800, a regular army unit composed of ethnic Greeks was established under the name Légion Grecque (Greek Legion). Commanded by Nikolaos Papazoglou it numbered 577 officers and soldiers. After the end of the French occupation of Egypt a part of the Greek Legion continued their service in the French military as part of the Bataillon Chasseurs d'Orient and other small units.

Many Greek Muslims from Crete (often confusingly called Cretan Turks) were resettled in Egypt, Libya, Lebanon, and Syria by Sultan Abdul Hamid II after the Greco-Turkish War of 1897 that resulted in the autonomy of Crete (see the example of al-Hamidiyah, a largely Cretan Greek Muslim village in Syria).

== Modern times ==
=== Greek community ===
In 1920, approximately 200,000 Greeks lived in Egypt. By c. 1940, the Greeks numbered about 300,000. The Greek community in Alexandria lived around the church and convent of Sabbas the Sanctified. In the same area there was a guest house for Greek travelers, a Greek hospital and later a Greek school. The Greek Orthodox bishop was based in Damietta in the church of Nikolaos of Myrna.

In Cairo, the first organised Greek community was founded in 1856, with the community based in three main neighbourhoods: Tzouonia, Haret el Roum (Street of the Greeks), and in Hamzaoui. The patriarchate was based in Saint Nicholas Greek Orthodox Cathedral, Hamzaoui. The monastery of Saint George, in Old Cairo still survives. The monastery is surrounded by a huge wall and topped by a stone tower. Within its walls there was a Greek hospital, a school and housing for the elderly and poor.

In addition to the Greek communities of Alexandria and Cairo, there were the organised Greek communities of Mansoura, founded in 1860, Port Said, founded in 1870, Tanta in 1880, and the community of Zagazig in 1850. There were fifteen smaller communities across Egypt and mainly around Cairo and Alexandria. In Upper Egypt, the oldest ancient Greek community was the one of Minia which was founded in 1812.

The first banks in Egypt were crafted by Greeks, including the Alexbank, the Anglo-Egyptian bank (Sunadinos family / Συναδινός), and the General Bank of Alexandria. Also, it was the Greek agriculturists and farmers that first systematically and with scientific planning, cultivated cotton and tobacco. They improved the quantity and quality of production and dominated cotton and tobacco exports. Notable families in tobacco commerce were the Salvagos (Σαλβάγκος), Benakis (Μπενάκης), Rodochanakis (Ροδοχανάκης) and Zervoudachis (Ζερβουδάκης). The tobacco cultivars used for cigarette manufacturing, e.g., by Kyriazi Freres, were of Greek origin. A thriving commerce between Greece and Egypt was thus established. Other areas of interest for the Greeks in Egypt were foods, wine, soap, wood crafts, printing.

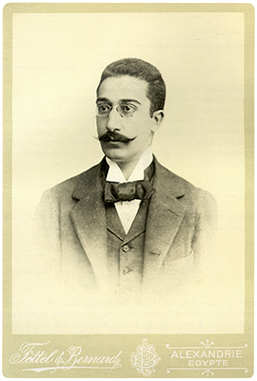
Constantine P. Cavafy

In the food industry, the macaroni industries of Melachrinos (Μελαχροινός) and Antoniadis (Αντωνιάδης) were well known. Another example was the cheese and butter production of Argyriou (Αργυρίου), Roussoglou (Ρουσσόγλου) and Paleoroutas (Παλαιορούτας). Chocolate-Biscuits and Toffee producers were: Daloghlou (Δαλόγλου), Russos (Ρούσσος), Repapis (Ρεπάπης); Oil-soaps-vegetable fats (Salt & Soda) producers like Zerbinis (Ζερμπίνης) were based in Kafr al-Zayat. There were many Greek theatres and cinemas. Major Greek newspapers were Ta grammata (Τα Γράμματα), Tachydromos (Ταχυδρόμος), and Nea Zoe (Νέα Ζωή). The Greek community in Egypt has produced numerous artists, writers, diplomats and politicians, the most famous being the poet Constantine P. Cavafy (Κωνσταντίνος Καβάφης), also the painter Konstantinos Parthenis (Κωνσταντίνος Παρθένης).

During the Balkan Wars, the Greek communities of Egypt sent volunteers, funded hospitals, and accommodated families of the soldiers. During World War II (1940–1945), more than 7,000 Greeks fought for the Allies in the Middle East; 142 died. Their financial contribution reached 2500 million Egyptian pounds. After the Suez Crisis, the British and French laborers left while the Greeks stayed.

=== Benefactors ===
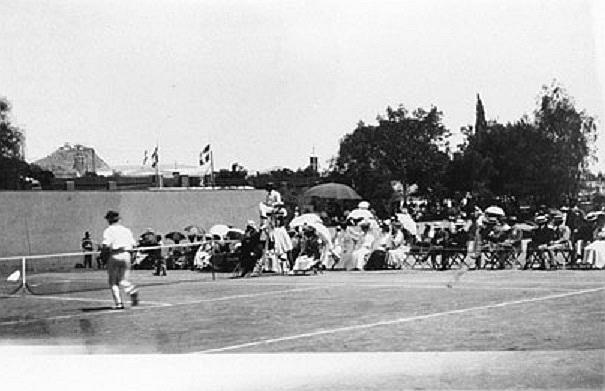
Dionysios Kasdaglis, ethnic Greek Egyptian tennis player at the Athens Olympics in 1896

The emergence of a Greek aristocracy of rich industrialists, merchants and bankers created the legacy of Greek-Egyptian philanthropism. These benefactors donated large amounts for the building of schools, academies, hospitals and institutions in both Egypt and Greece. Michail Tositsas donated large amounts for the building of the Athens University, the Amalio Orphanage and the Athens Polytechnic. His wife Eleni Tositsa donated the land for the National Archaeological Museum of Athens. George Averoff also contributed to the building of the National Technical University of Athens, the Evelpidon Military Academy and the donation of the cruiser Averoff to the Hellenic Navy. Emmanouil Benakis contributed to the building of the National Gallery of Athens, while his son Antonis Benakis was the founder of the Benaki Museum. Other major benefactors include Nikolaos Stournaras, Theodoros Kotsikas, Nestoras Tsanaklis, Konstantinos Horemis, Stefanos Delta, Penelope Delta, Pantazis Vassanis and Vassilis Sivitanidis.

=== Exodus from Egypt ===
The exodus of Greeks from Egypt started before the coup d'état of 1952. With the establishment of the new sovereign regime of Gamal Abdel Nasser, rise of Pan-Arab nationalism, and the subsequent nationalisation of many industries in 1961 and 1963, thousands of Greek employees decided to emigrate. Many of them emigrated to Australia, the United States, Canada, South Africa, Western Europe, and Greece. Many Greek schools, churches, small communities and institutions subsequently closed, although some continue to function to this day. The Nasser regime saw a big exodus of the Greeks from Egypt, but most of the minority left the country either before or after the period 1952–1970. The Arab-Israeli wars of 1956 and 1967 contributed to the uprooting of the sizeable Greek community in the Suez Canal cities, especially Port Said.

=== Today ===
Today the Greek community numbers officially about 7,000 people. Many of Greek origin are now counted as Egyptian, having changed their nationality. In Alexandria, apart from the Patriarchate, there is a Patriarchal theology school that opened recently after 480 years being closed. Saint Nicholas church in Cairo and several other buildings in Alexandria have been recently renovated by the Greek Government and the Alexander S. Onassis Foundation. Saint George's church in Old Cairo is undergoing restoration to end in 2014. During the last decade, there has been a new interest from the Egyptian government for a diplomatic rapprochement with Greece and this has positively affected the Greek Diaspora. The Diaspora has received official visits of many Greek politicians. Economic relationships between Greece and Egypt have expanded. As of 2010, Egypt has received major Greek investments in banking, tourism, paper, the oil industry, and many others. In 2009, a five-year cooperation-memorandum was signed among the NCSR Demokritos Institute in Agia Paraskevi, Athens and the University of Alexandria, regarding Archeometry research and contextual sectors.

== Census ==
Number of Greeks according to the Census in Egypt.

Number of Greeks in Egypt 1907–1960
| Egypt | 1907 | 1927 | 1937 | 1947 | 1960 | 1967 |
|---|---|---|---|---|---|---|
| Greeks | 62,973 | 76,264 | 68,559 | 57,427 | 47,673 | 17,000 |

== Notable Greeks from Egypt ==
Greeks of Cyrene (the Cyrenaica is a region corresponding to modern eastern Libya) are also included, as during antiquity it held close relations to the Egyptian kingdoms, and at some points, also used to be a part of the Ptolemaic Kingdom. The presence of an asterisk (*) next to a person's name denotes that the person was born outside of Egypt, however the most important part of this person's life or most important work occurred while in Egypt.

| Antiquity 7th–1st century BC | Roman and Byzantine era 1st–7th century AD | Arab Caliphate & Ottoman era 7th–19th century | Contemporary 20th–21st century |
|---|---|---|---|
| Battus I of Cyrene * _{Ruler, 7th century BC, Cyrene} | Hero of Alexandria _{Engineer, 1st century BC or AD, Alexandria} | Giovanni d'Anastasi * _{Merchant, Consul General of Sweden-Norway, c. 1780–1860, Alexandria} | Jean Dessès _{Fashion designer, 1904–1970, Alexandria} |
| Theodorus of Cyrene _{Mathematician, 5th century BC, Cyrene} | Philo _{Philosopher, 20 BC – 50 AD, Alexandria} | Stephan Zizinia * _{Merchant, Consul General of Belgium, 1784–1868, Alexandria} | Alexander Iolas _{Art collector, 1907–1987, Alexandria} |
| Aristippus _{Philosopher, 435–356 BC, Cyrene} | Chaeremon of Alexandria _{Philosopher, 1st century AD, Alexandria} | Michael and Eleni Tositsas * _{Merchants, Consul General of Greece, c. 1787–1856 and 1796–1866, Alexandria} | Kimon Evan Marengo _{Cartoonist, 1907–1988, Zifta} |
| Aristaeus the Elder * _{Mathematician, 370–300 BC, Alexandria} | Menelaus of Alexandria _{Mathematician, 70–140 AD, Alexandria} | Nikolaos Stournaras * _{Merchant, 1806–1853, Alexandria} | Nikos Tsiforos _{Director, 1909–1970, Alexandria} |
| Ptolemy I Soter * _{Ruler, 367–282 BC, Alexandria} | Ptolemy _{Geographer, 90–168 AD, Alexandria} | George Averoff * _{Businessman, 1815–1899, Alexandria} | Dimos Starenios _{Theater-cinema actor, 15 Sept 1909 Cairo–23 Oct 1983 Athens} |
| Philitas of Cos * _{Poet, 340–285 BC, Alexandria} | Sosigenes of Alexandria _{Astronomer, 1st century AD, Alexandria} | Emmanouil Benakis * _{Politician, 1843–1929, Alexandria} | Nicholas & Spiro Spathis _{Drink entrepreneurs (company established 1920), Alexandria} |
| Theodorus the Atheist _{Philosopher, 340–250 BC, Cyrene} | Thrasyllus of Mendes _{Mathematician, 1st century AD, Alexandria} | Ioannis Pesmazoglou * _{Economist, 1857–1906, Alexandria} | Mary Giatra Lemou _{Author, 1915–1989, Alexandria} |
| Euclid * _{Mathematician, 325–265 BC, Alexandria} | Clement of Alexandria _{Theologian, 150–211 AD, Alexandria} | Constantine Cavafy _{Poet, 1863–1933, Alexandria} | Dinos Iliopoulos _{Actor, 1915–2001, Alexandria} |
| Magas of Cyrene _{Ruler, 317–250 BC, Cyrene} | Origen _{Theologian, 185–251 AD, Alexandria} | Dimitrios Kasdaglis * _{Athlete, 1872–1931, Alexandria} | Voula Zouboulaki _{Actor, 1924, Cairo} |
| Ptolemy II Philadelphus * _{Ruler, 309–246 BC, Alexandria} | Plotinus _{Philosopher, 203–270 AD, Alexandria} | Kyriazi Frères _{Cigarette manufacturing company (established 1873)} | Jani Christou _{Composer, 1926–1970, Cairo} |
| Callimachus _{Poet, 305–240 BC, Cyrene} | Diophantus _{Mathematician, c. 210 – c. 290 AD, Alexandria} | Antonis Benakis _{Businessman, 1873–1954, Alexandria} | Nelly Mazloum _{Dancer, 1929–2003, Alexandria} |
| Ctesibius _{Engineer, 285–222 BC, Alexandria} | Catherine of Alexandria _{Theologian, 282–305 AD, Alexandria} | Penelope Delta _{Author, 1874–1941, Alexandria} | Constantin Xenakis _{Artist, 1931, Cairo} |
| Conon of Samos * _{Astronomer, 280–220 BC, Alexandria} | Pappus of Alexandria _{Mathematician, 290–350 AD, Alexandria} | Konstantinos Parthenis _{Painter, 1878–1967, Alexandria} | Antigone Costanda _{Model, 1934, Alexandria} |
| Eratosthenes _{Mathematician, 276–194 BC, Alexandria} | Theon of Alexandria _{Mathematician, 335–405 AD, Alexandria} | Konstantinos Tsaldaris _{Politician, 1884–1970, Alexandria} | Georges Moustaki _{Singer, 1934–2013, Alexandria} |
| Apollonius of Rhodes _{Poet, 3rd century BC, Alexandria} | Hypatia _{Mathematician, 370–416 AD, Alexandria} | | Manos Loïzos _{Composer, 1937–1982, Alexandria} |
| Sostratus of Cnidus * _{Engineer, 3rd century BC, Alexandria} | Palladas _{Poet, 4th century AD, Alexandria} | | George Leonardos _{Author, 1937, Alexandria} |
| Hypsicles _{Mathematician, 190–120 BC, Alexandria} | Isidore of Alexandria _{Philosopher, 450–520 AD, Alexandria} | | Clea Badaro _{Painter, 1913–1968, Alexandria} |
| Dionysius of Cyrene _{Mathematician, 2nd century BC, Cyrene} | Hierocles of Alexandria _{Philosopher, 5th century AD, Alexandria} | | Nikos Perakis _{Director, 1944, Alexandria} |
| Eudorus of Alexandria _{Philosopher, 1st century BC, Alexandria} | Hesychius of Alexandria _{Author, 5th century AD, Alexandria} | | Demetrio Stratos _{Singer, 1945–1979, Alexandria} |
| Aretaphila of Cyrene _{Revolutionary, 1st century BC, Cyrene} | | | Demis Roussos _{Singer, 1946–2015, Alexandria} |
| Cleopatra VII _{Ruler, 69–30 BC, Alexandria} | | | Andreas Gerasimos Michalitsianos _{Astronomer, 1947–1997, Alexandria} |
| Ptolemy III Euergetes * _{Ruler, 246–222 BC, Alexandria} | | | Nora Valsami _{Actress, 1948, Cairo} |
| | | | Alkistis Protopsalti _{Singer, 1954, Alexandria} |
| | | | Alex Proyas _{Director, 1963, Cairo} |

== See also ==
- Demographics of Egypt
- Egypt–Greece relations

== Sources ==
- Dalachanis, Angelos (2017). The Greek Exodus from Egypt: Diaspora Politics and Emigration 1937-1962. London: Berghann. ISBN 978-1-78533-447-4.
- Oikonomou, Foivos (2016). Ελληνες Μισθοφόροι στην Υπηρεσία της Επαναστατικής Γαλλίας (1789-1815) [Greek Mercenaries in the Service of Revolutionary France (1789-1815)] (in Greek). Thessaloniki: University Studio Press. ISBN 978-960-12-2251-6.
