= Ancient Roman freedmen =

Social class of former slaves

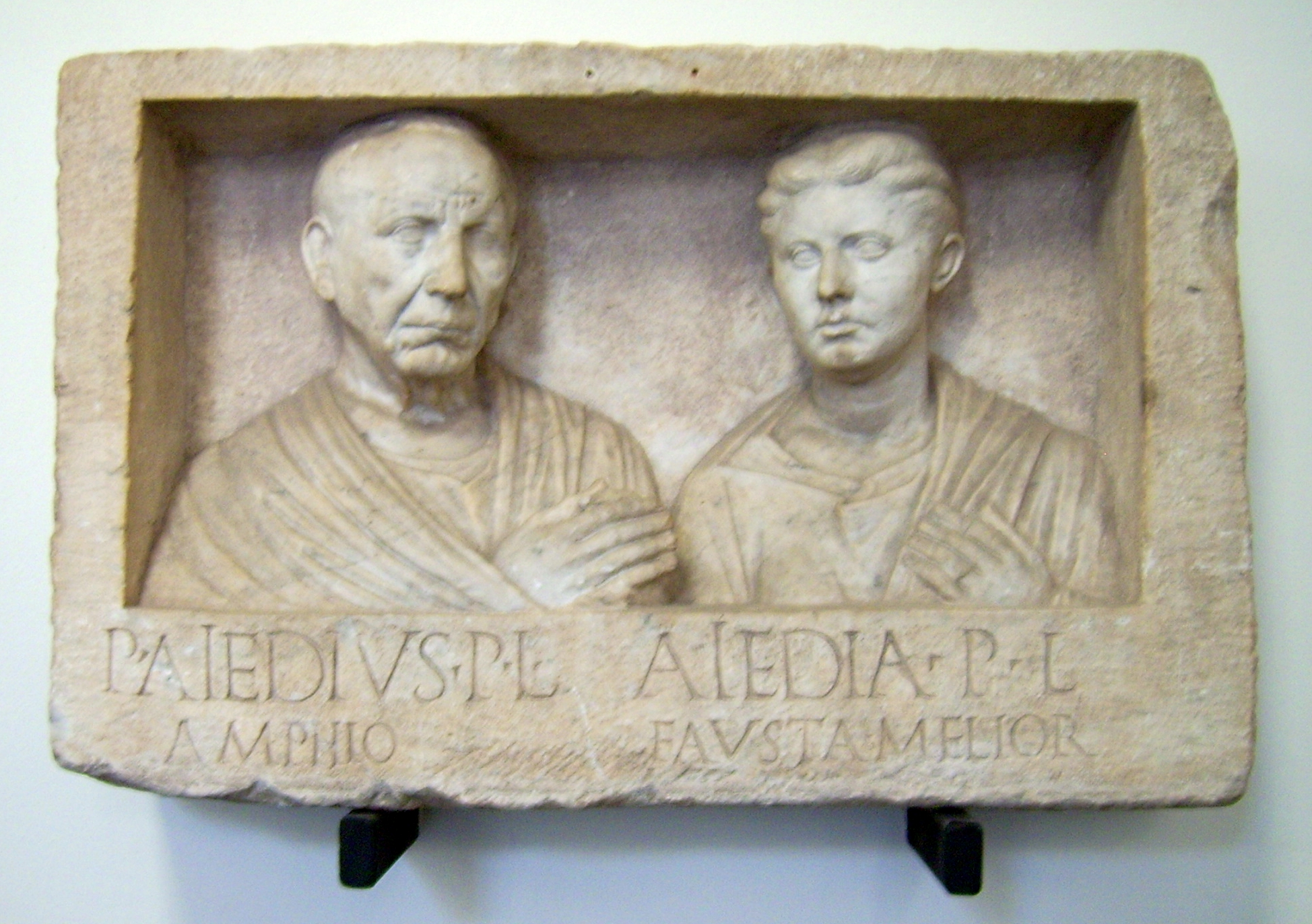
Grave relief of freedman Publius Aiedius Amphio and freedwoman Aiedia Fausta Melior

Freedmen in ancient Rome existed as a distinct social class (liberti or libertini), with former slaves granted freedom and rights through the legal process of manumission. The Roman practice of slavery utilized slaves for both production and domestic labour, overseen by their wealthy masters. Urban and domestic slaves especially could achieve high levels of education, acting as agents and representatives of their masters' affairs and finances. Within Roman law there was a set of practices for freeing trusted slaves, granting them a limited form of Roman citizenship or Latin rights. These freed slaves were known in Latin as liberti (freedmen), and formed a class set apart from freeborn Romans. While freedmen were barred from some forms of social mobility in Roman society, many achieved high levels of wealth and status. Liberti were an important part of the "most economically active and innovative entrepreneurial class" in the Roman Empire. The legal and social status of freedmen remained a point of cultural and legal contention throughout the Republic and Empire.

== Manumission ==
Manumission was codified during the Early Republic, with three main legal forms being observed: manumissio vindicta, censu, and testamento. The Institutes of Gaius, compiled c. 160 CE, detail these three processes. For manumissio vindicta, a "vindication of freedom", a master revoked his ownership of a slave before a praetor, who would touch the slave with a rod of office to signify his change in status. To achieve manumissio censu, a master could simply enroll a slave in the Roman census, declaring them as a libertus of his household. The most legally complex process was manumissio testamento, which freed the slave in a deceased master's will (testamentum) with conditions specified.

All three methods result in a legal change in status. A freed slave would thereon be known as a libertus of his former family, with mutual obligations to each other within the traditional patronage network. The terms of his manumission might specify the services (operae) a libertus owed. Following manumission, the freed slave would take on the nomen gentilicium (family name) of his former master, who would adopt the freedman into a pseudo-paternal relationship; should they be alive the freedman would be expected to honor and serve his patron. Freedmen were permitted to form their own networks of patrons and freedmen, as well as own slaves. Upon manumission, freedmen were permitted to wear the pileus, a type of cap commonly taken as a sign of freedom. Freedmen were often depicted wearing a pileus on their commemoration celebrating their manumission.

== Social status ==
As a social class, former slaves were libertini, a social status that conferred either Roman citizenship or Latin rights depending on circumstance. As citizens, men could vote and participate in politics, but could not run for office, nor be admitted to the senatorial class. The commonly held cultural belief, especially amongst the Roman elite was that slavery conferred a "moral taint", from which freedmen were not exempt. This moral taint was a common theme in Roman literature, with the traits of "subservience", "deceitfulness", and "intractability" being seen as specific to slaves and freedmen, unbefitting of freeborn Roman values.

Freedmen were also viewed as lacking their own social identity, with their reputation, station, and wealth being tied to their patron and the circumstances of their manumission. A freedman who became rich and influential might still be looked down on by the traditional aristocracy as a vulgar nouveau riche, as they engaged directly in commerce, while the traditional aristocracy only indirectly interacted with the markets. Trimalchio, a character in the Satyricon, is a caricature of such a freedman. Some of the common arguments against manumission are encapsulated by Dionysius of Halicarnassus in Antiquities 4.24, wherein he states that manumission could introduce criminal elements to the populace, be used to exploit the grain dole, and be used for merely to improve the perception of the master's virtue.

The freeborn children of former slaves enjoyed the full privileges of Roman citizenship without restrictions, although laws introduced by Augustus barred the descendants of freedmen from the senatorial class. The Latin poet Horace was the son of a freedman, and in his Satires portrays his father as the very model of the ideal freedman, in opposition to the common stereotypes of his time. Some freedmen enjoyed high levels of wealth and station; of note are the imperial freedmen, the familia caesaris, who had a large degree of influence in imperial administration and bureaucracy. The brothers who owned House of the Vettii, one of the biggest and most magnificent houses in Pompeii, are thought to have been freedmen. Additionally, scholars have been able to identify the presence of wealthy freedmen properties through their distinct interest in funerary epitaphs which commemorated their manumission and economic success.

While freedmen were barred from most forms of social and political climbing, they were able to gain influence in local and district politics, especially in serving as magistri of local cults and through working in municipal bureaucracy. These post allowed for freedmen to extend their reputations among the community through public works. Freedmen were also known to dedicate these works to their freeborn children, ensuring their future reputation in the community. Freedmen also played a role in the Roman education system, as many pedagogues in Rome were either slaves or freedmen, indicating the degree of education and trust achievable by some slaves and freedmen.

Notable freedmen included the translator and dramatist Livius Andronicus, the comic playwright Terence, the writer of sententiae Publilius Syrus, the father of the poet Horace, the scholar Alexander Polyhistor, the author Gaius Julius Hyginus, Augustus's physician Antonius Musa, the fabulist Phaedrus, the Stoic philosopher Epictetus, and the father of the emperor Pertinax.

== The reforms of Augustus and the early empire ==
Following Augustus' rise to prominence in Rome, he enacted a program of laws intended to rectify what he perceived as the moral decay of the late Republic. These laws had an impact on freedmen to varying degrees, but Augustus' specific relationship and views towards freedmen suggest that he was committed to reducing the number of "undesirable" freedmen being manumitted. The lex Aelia Sentia introduced limits to the number of slaves that could be freed, preventing young or insane people from freeing slaves, and stipulating that in order to gain Roman citizenship, a freed slave be over 30 years of age. Furthermore, the lex Papia Poppaea and lex Iulia de maritandis ordinibus restricted whom freedmen were permitted to marry, including barring the female descendants of freedmen from marrying into the senatorial class. While Augustus' new social laws imposed some restriction on manumission, his program of laws promoting marriage also permitted female slaves to be manumitted via marriage to their master, fully legalizing the practice. The lex Iunia also shored up the freedman's legal protections and more solidly codified the practices of manumission, having the dual purpose of introducing mechanisms of punishment for ungrateful freedmen, but also preventing a patron's abuse of his power over his freepersons.

Following the death of Augustus, Tiberius instituted a new priesthood, the Sodales Augustales. With most elements of social standing and advancement barred to both past and present slaves, wealthy freedmen made up much of the organization's membership. Aside from religious affairs, the Augustales were active in public life, and evidence from Pompeii and Herculaneum suggests that they were involved in funding public works, entertainment and celebrations.

== Freedmen under the Empire ==
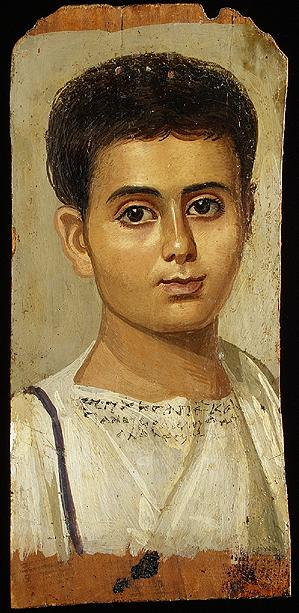
Funerary portrait of a boy named Eutyches, a freedman in Roman Egypt, c. 100–150 AD

In the early empire the overall status of freedmen varied little from their status under the Republican system; while the Augustan reforms had moderately shifted their place in society, new opportunities for freedmen emerged under the new Principate. The emperor's household held both slaves and freedmen, creating a group known as the familia Caesaris. Within the household the imperial freedmen functioned in much the same way as other urban familia, acting as representatives and bureaucrats for the imperial family. Members of the familia Caesaris were particularly prominent under the rule of Claudius, with a triad of freedmen, Pallas, Narcissus, and Callistus being highly influential. Claudius's association with his freedmen was well-known and controversial, with historians such as Dio accusing him of having slavish qualities.

Outside of the city of Rome, especially in Roman colonia, freedmen were offered greater opportunities for influence in local politics, especially in cities with high plebeian and freed populations, where the traditional hierarchies were somewhat disrupted. Despite being barred from higher offices, the law provided certain solutions to traditional restrictions on freedmen: an example being the wealthy freedmen Popidius Ampliatus, whose freeborn, six-year-old son Numerius Popidius Celsinus served on Pompeii's town council. Other such youthful appointments suggest that colonial governments were willing to work around the restrictions on freedmen in novel ways, providing the fathers of such children a voice in local politics while not breaking legal or social restrictions.

The treatment of freedmen in far-flung parts of the Empire differed slightly from Rome and Italy. With less judicial oversight regarding the treatment of freedmen, there were community concerns over patron's abuse of their labour and the possibility of re enslavement. Therefore, the manumission process was often overseen by religious bodies, framing a slave's manumission as protected by both the gods and Roman law. During the late Empire, on the edict of Constantine, these religious protections were expanded to the Christian Church, creating a new form of manumission, Manumission in Ecclesia (Manumission before a Congregation). Constantine's reforms also codified and solidified the authority of the patron over their freedom, codifying concrete punishments for truant, "ungrateful", and disobedient freedmen, up to and including re-enslavement, although these laws were annulled, altered, and reinstated by a number of Constantine's successors.

== Freedwomen ==
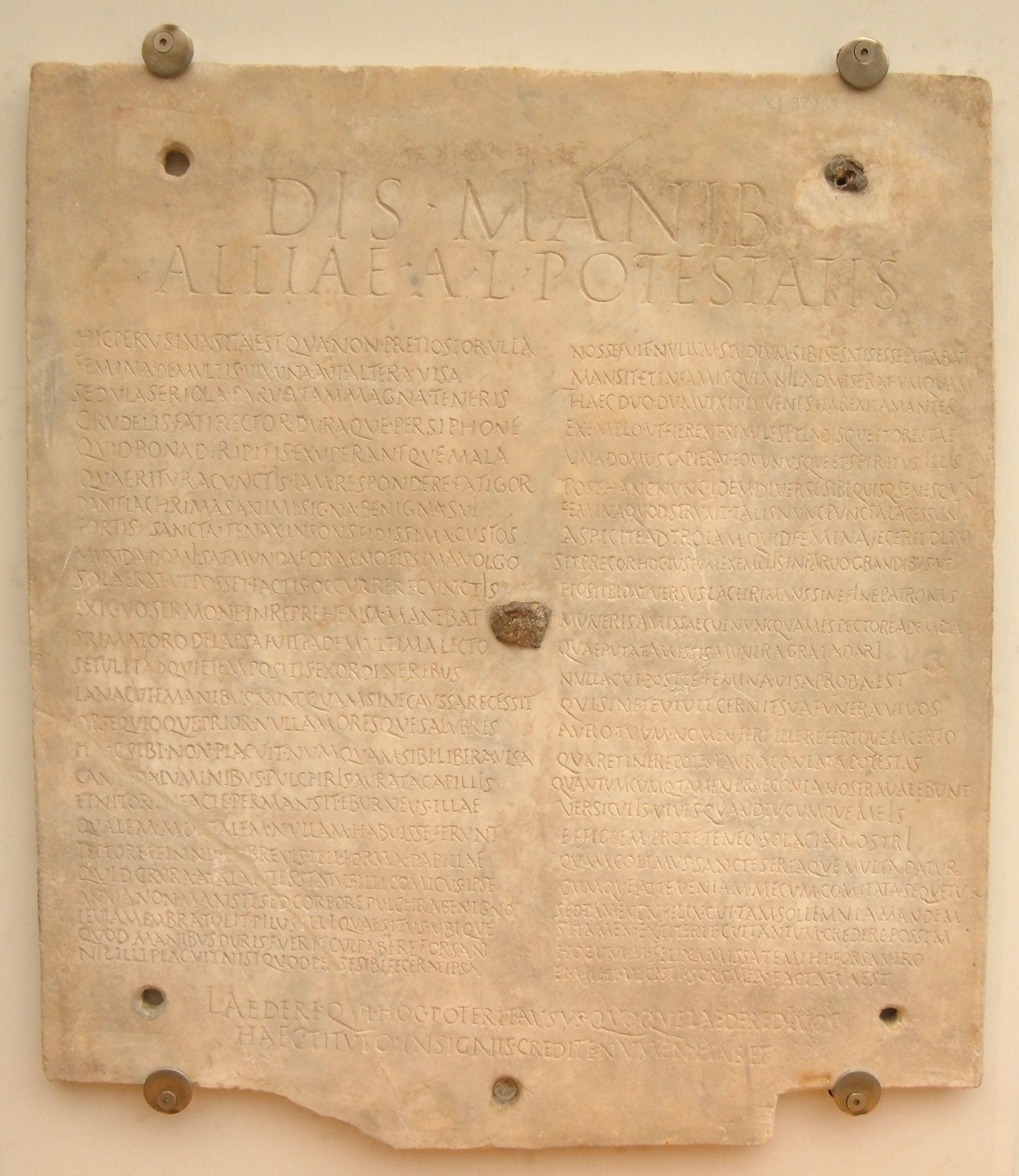
Funerary inscription for the freedwoman Allia Potestas, notable for its use of literary elegiacs in her praise (CIL VI 037965)

Freedwomen are poorly attested in Roman sources, although their treatment in law demonstrates a different experience from their male counterparts. As freedpersons were not seen as having a distinct civic identity from their patrons, there was a social paradox for a freedwoman, who would be expected to conform to the social role of matrona. While a freedwoman may be granted citizenship, they were restricted from politics and most forms of independent money-making.

The cultural expectation of a free Roman woman was to maintain social respectability and sexual integrity, which conflicted heavily with the master's treatment of enslaved women. Unwed freedwomen could expect to be bound to their patron for their entire lives, entering into the same pseudo-paternal relationship as freedmen, but with similar restrictions placed on freeborn daughters. The patron would retain the guardianship (tutor legitimus) of a freedwoman and would have more direct influence in her affairs and finances.

Laws like the lex Papia Poppaea and lex Aelia Sentia permitted masters to wed and free their female slaves, although the freedwoman had little legal say in the matter. The forms of labour (operae) that a freedwoman could perform for their patron were limited by law; while they could engage in commerce and craft for their patron, they were legally protected from being forced into prostitution by their master. Freedwomen had some opportunities to gain public status, as in a similar way to male freedmen, freedwomen were permitted to gain high station in local religious cults and act as public priestesses. Inscriptions from freedwomen are present at Pompeii and Herculaneum, typically alongside the names of their husbands and children but, more rarely, dedicated solely by them.

== See also ==
- Slave-owning slaves
