= Eleni Tositsa =

Greek archaeologist (1796–1866)

Portrait of Eleni Tositsa

Eleni Tositsa (1796 – 1 April 1866; Greek: Ελένη Τοσίτσα) was a major benefactor to cultural and educational establishments in Greece, including the National Archaeological Museum and the National Technical University of Athens.

Eleni Tositsa was born in Metsovo, Epirus, in 1796. She married Michael Tositsas in 1818 and moved with him first to Alexandria in 1820 and then to Athens in 1854. During the Greek revolution, she organised the buying and freeing of enslaved Greeks from Egyptian slave markets. After her husband's death in 1855, she inherited most of his property, which he instructed in his will should be used to benefit the Greek state. Tositsa donated large sums of this money to various schools, including funding a new building for the Educational Society's girls' school (known as the Tositseion), and founding a girls' school in her hometown of Metsovo, and to Queen Amalia's Orphanage.

On 14 May 1860, she donated a plot of land to the Hellenic State to provide a site for the National Metsovio Technical University, also known as the National Technical University of Athens or the Polytechnic; the university transferred to this site on Patission Street in 1871. The name 'Metsovio' refers to the town of Metsovo in Epirus, the hometown of Eleni Tositsa and Michael Tositsas as well as two other benefactors, Nikolaos Stournaris and Georgios Averof.

The National Archaeological Museum, which was originally located in Aegina, was transferred to Athens when this city became the capital in 1834; construction of a purpose-built building began in 1866 after Tositsa donated the plot of land on which the museum is now located, and the building opened to the public in 1889. The street which runs between the museum and the National Technical University is now named Tositsa Street (Οδός Τοσίτσα).

She died on April 1, 1866, in Athens.
