= Pavlos Prosalentis =

Greek sculptor (1784–1837)

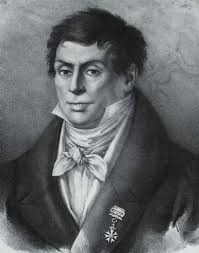
- Portrait of Prosalentis, date and artist unknown
- Born: 28 January 1784; Corfu, Ionian Islands, Republic of Venice
- Died: 1 February 1837 (aged 53); Corfu, United States of the Ionian Islands

Pavlos Prosalentis (Greek: Παύλος Προσαλέντης; 28 January 1784 in Corfu – 1 February 1837 in Corfu) was the first professional sculptor in modern Greece. He is often referred to as "The Elder" to distinguish him from his grandson, also named Pavlos Prosalentis (1857-1894), who was a painter.

== Biography ==
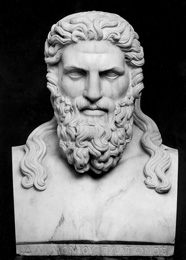
Bust of Plato (1815), the first dated modern Greek sculpture

He was descended from a noble Byzantine family, who fled to areas under the control of the Venetian Republic after the Fall of Constantinople. His first teacher was an Italian sculptor and woodcarver who was living on Corfu.

In 1805, he went to Rome where he enrolled at the Accademia di San Luca and studied with Antonio Canova. After returning to Corfu, he participated in creating an "Academy of Sciences", sponsored by the French government.

In 1811, he opened a private art school; the first such modern school to be established in Greece. When Corfu became a protectorate of the British Empire in 1815, Lord High Commissioner Thomas Maitland transformed the school into the "Public Academy of Fine Arts". By 1819, it had eighty students. The following year, Prosalentis was awarded the Order of St Michael and St George. The painter Dionysios Vegias was one of his pupils.

In 1824, when Lord Guilford created the Ionian Academy, Prosalentis was one of the first to be offered a teaching position there. He accepted, but declined to take a salary, suggesting that the money be spent on making copies of the Elgin Marbles and other works that had been removed from the Parthenon, and using them for educational or restorative work. He eventually received numerous free copies, creating scholarships from the money saved. Although not a wealthy man, he often gave private lessons for only the cost of materials and transportation.

Eventually, casting and other foundry work damaged his health and he died in 1837, at the age of fifty-three.

In addition to his own sculpting, he also made sketches for works by other sculptors and pedestal panels for several monuments and busts. He also did some painting, mostly of a religious nature. Many of his works have been lost or destroyed. In addition to his namesake, Pavlos (mentioned above), his son Spyridon, grandson Aimilios, and granddaughters, Olga and Eleni were also artists.

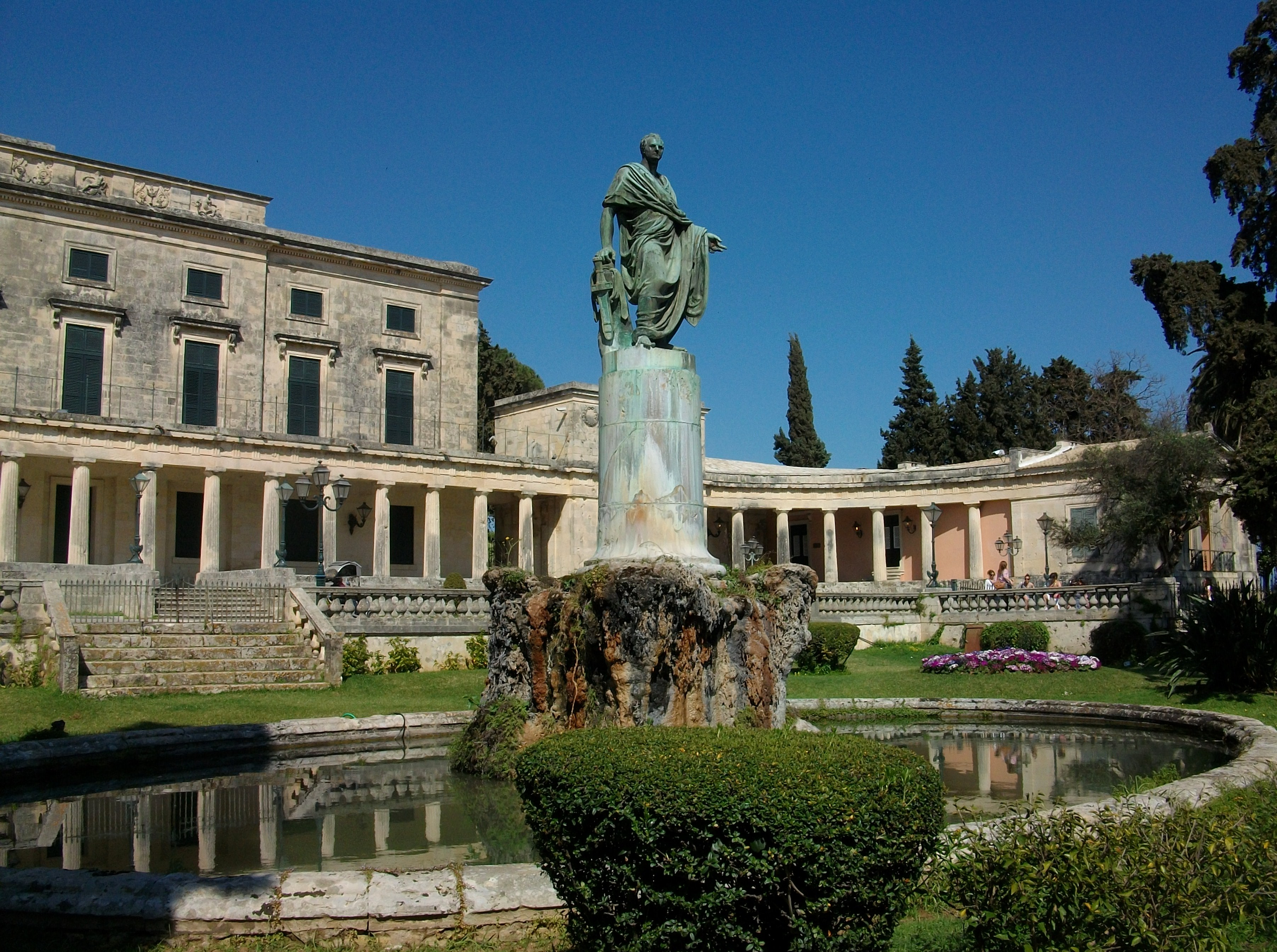
Statue of Sir Frederick Adam, at the Palace of St. Michael and St. George, Corfu
