= Pavlos Prosalentis (the Younger) =

Greek painter (1857-1894)

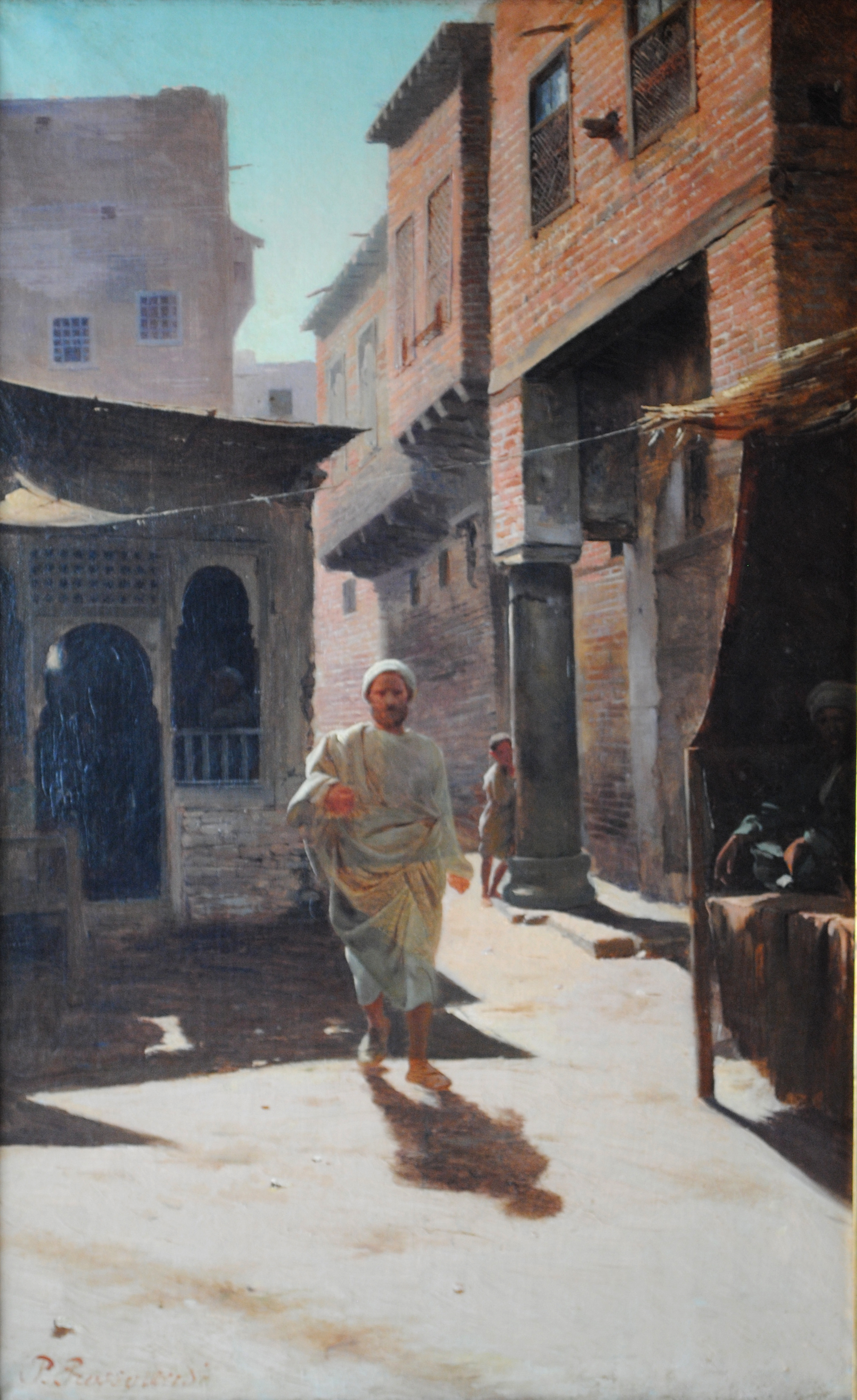
The Marketplace in Cairo

Pavlos Prosalentis (GreeK: Παύλος Προσαλέντης; 1857, Corfu - 1894, Alexandria) was a Greek painter. He is generally referred to as "The Younger" to distinguish him from his grandfather, also named Pavlos Prosalentis, who was a sculptor.

== Biography ==
He was born to a prominent Corfu family. When he was born on Corfu it was part of the United States of the Ionian Islands, but became part of the Kingdom of Greece when he was about 6. His father, Spyridon Prosalentis, was a well-known portrait painter. His brother, Aimilios, and his sisters, Olga and Eleni, also became artists. He studied in Corfu, Venice and Paris, where the influence on his style was strongest. Some sources add Athens and Naples to his travels. His teachers included his father and Nikiforos Lytras, He returned to Greece in 1870.

After only a short time at home, he moved to Egypt; settling in Alexandria. It was there that most of his works were created. He was heavily influenced by the art of the late Renaissance, which was most apparent in his portraits. His subjects included notable members of the Greek communities in Egypt, as well as Prime Ministers Charilaos Trikoupis and Kyriakoulis Mavromichalis He also produced numerous paintings on a wide variety of Egyptian and Orientalist themes, and a large number of maritime scenes, as did his brother Aimilios.

One of his most familiar portraits was actually done from a photograph; that of the businessman and philanthropist, Georgios Averof. For many years, it hung in the Greek high school, in Alexandria. Since that school's closure, it has been at the Averof Gallery in Metsovo.

He died in Alexandria in 1894, of unknown causes, aged only thirty-seven.

His works may be seen at the National Historical Museum, Athens, and the Municipal Gallery of Corfu. Some of his portraits are at the Hellenic Parliament. Many are in private collections.
