= Spyridon Prosalentis =

Greek painter (1830–1895)

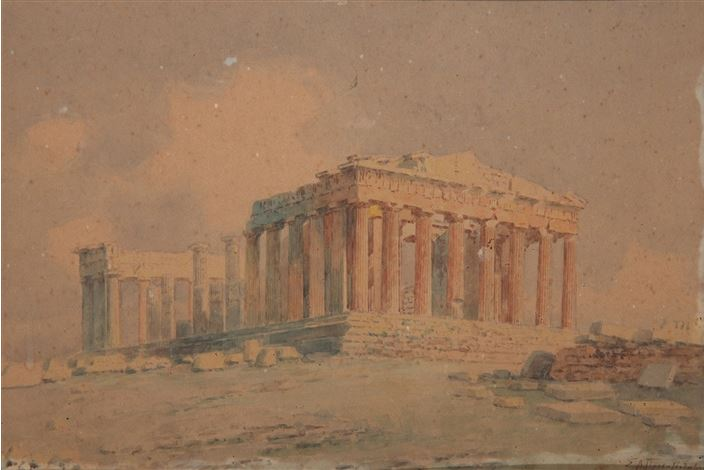
A sketch of the Parthenon

Spyridon Prosalentis (Greek: Σπυρίδων Προσαλέντης; Corfu, 1830 – Athens, 1895) was a Greek portrait painter of the Heptanese school. His first name is sometimes seen as Spyros.

== Biography ==
Prosalentis was descended from a noble Byzantine family, who fled to areas under the control of the Venetian Republic after the fall of Constantinople. His father was Pavlos Prosalentis, who is considered to be the first significant modern Greek sculptor and, in 1811, created Greece's first art school.

His earliest lessons naturally came from his father. Later, he finished his education at the Accademia di Belle Arti di Venezia. He remained in the Austrian Empire until 1865 and, when he returned, received an appointment as Professor of painting at the Athens School of Fine Arts. For unknown reasons, he resigned from that position the following year and went back to Venice.

In 1870, he won a major award at the "Exhibition of Fine Arts" in Parma, and was invited to return to Greece by King George I. He settled in Athens and immediately began to create murals in the chapel of the Old Royal Palace. In 1876, a second chair of painting was established at the School of Fine Arts and he received another appointment as Professor, a position he held until his death. Spyridon Vikatos, Dimitrios Geraniotis and Nikolaos Ferbos were among his students.

Upon commission from the Royal Family of Greece, Prosalentis completed several series of portraits of notable personalities from the Greek Revolution, the University of Athens, and the War and Navy Departments. He also painted some domestic genre scenes, but those are much less familiar. Prosalentis artworks are exhibited at the National Gallery of Greece, the Municipal Gallery of Corfu, the Teloglion Foundation of Arts, the Averoff Gallery etc.

His sons, Pavlos and Aimilios, and his daughters, Olga and Eleni, also became well-known painters.

== Gallery of portraits ==
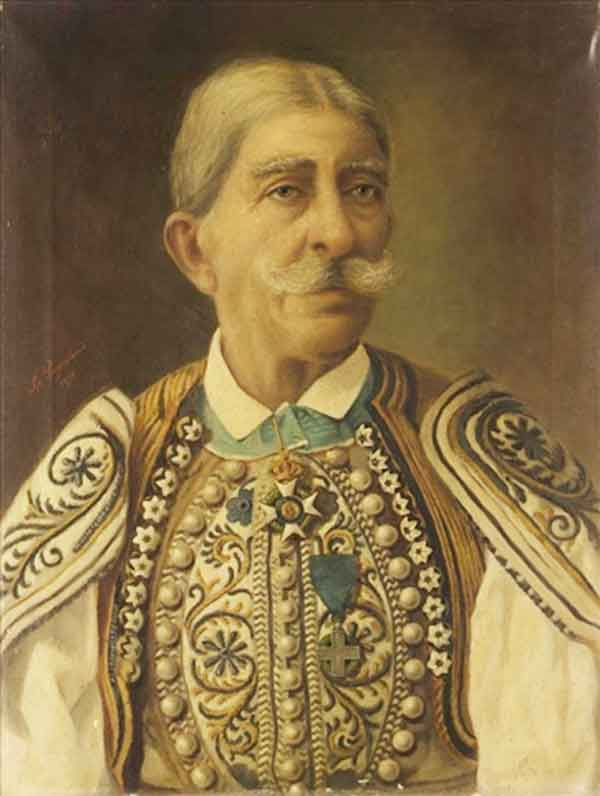
Portrait of
Themistoklis Trikoupis,
a hero of the Greek Revolution.

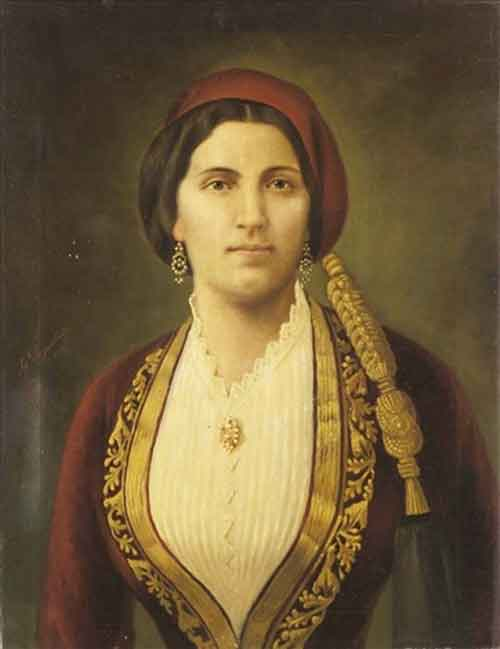
Portrait of
Kalidona Trikoupis, Themistoklis' wife.

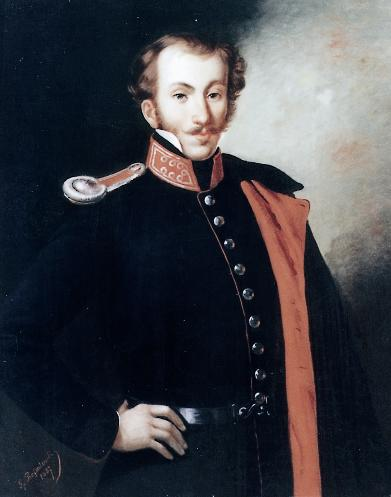
Portrait of
Dimitrios Ypsilantis

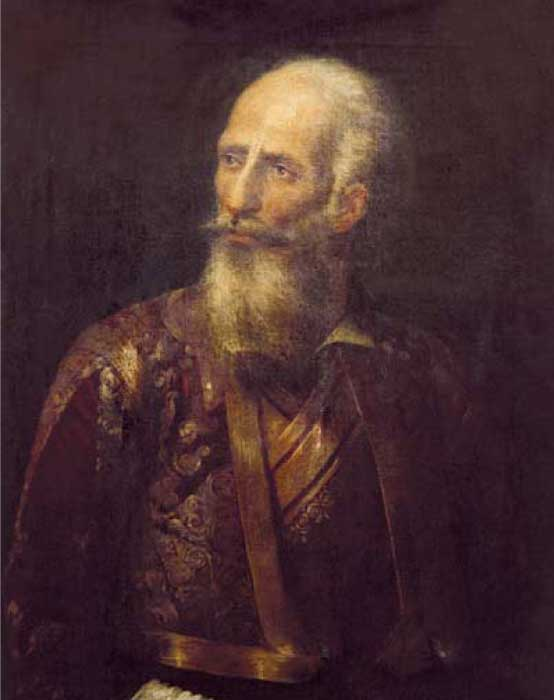
Portrait of
Yannis Makriyannis

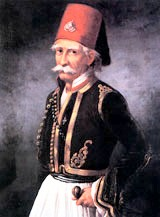
Portrait of
Panagiotis Giatrakos

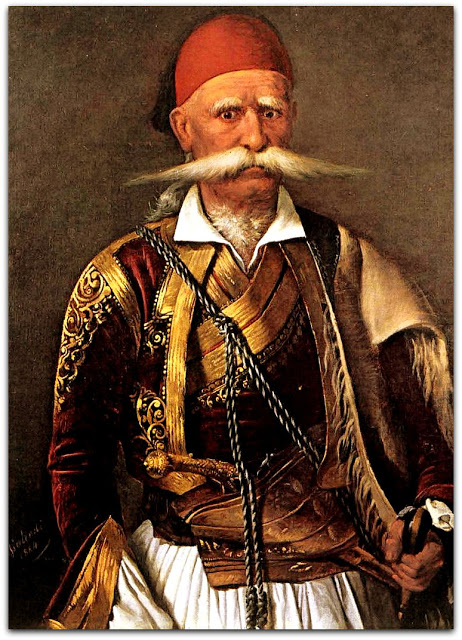
Portrait of
Yiannis Dyovouniotis
