= Spiro Spathis =

Egpytian soft drink brand by MYMCO

- Type: Soft drink
- Origin: Egypt
- Introduced: 1920
- Website: www.spirospathis.com

Spiro Spathis is an Egyptian carbonated soft drink, which is manufactured by MYMCO (for Food And Beverage Company).

== History ==
=== Founding ===
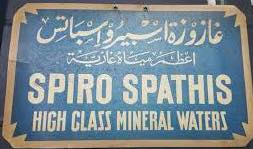
Old Spiro Spathis sign

In 1909, Nicolas Spathis, a Greek entrepreneur from Alexandria, began producing and selling lemonade soda in green glass bottles. Two decades later in 1920 his nephew, Spiro Spathis, expanded the family venture in Cairo, by establishing Egypt's first soda beverage and a soft drink's business that bore his name. The company's logo featured a buzzing bee, a nod to the family's involvement in apiary businesses at the time.

The product gained popularity across Egypt, prompting the founder to expand operations by purchasing a factory on Rue Emadeddin. In 1921, Spiro introduced a new flavor to complement the original lemonade: an apple cider flavoured drink which quickly became popular among the local consumers. This was followed by tonic water and a rebranded bottle in 1925. The year 1935 marked the addition of several new flavors including ginger ale, "lime juice & soda", grenadine, and grapefruit. In recognition of the brand's local success, Spiro Spathis was awarded the Farouk I Medal in 1941.

In 1950, Spiro's daughter, Aftakhia Spathis, took over the business.

=== During the Infitah era and effect, change in ownership ===
The brand maintained its popularity until 1974 when Egypt's third president, Anwar Sadat, launched the Infitah (Open Door) policy as an economic reform aimed at reducing Egypt's reliance on locally socialist policies. The policy opened the market to foreign investment, encouraging integration with the global market. However, the shift increased the country's dependency on imported good and contributed to the decline of local industries from foreign competitors.

The company remained family-owned until 1998 when it was acquired by the Sasba Carbonated Water Company, which was later renamed MYMCO Food And Beverage Company. The purchasing company was founded in 1970 by brother businessmen Talaat Atwan and Samir Atwan, who had been working on developing local soft drinks. MYMCO undertook a modernisation of the product line.

After a temporary closure in 2014, Spiro Spathis relaunched in 2019.

=== 2023: Resurgence ===
The brand resurged in popularity following a national campaign to boycott international products in relation to support of Israeli occupation and the Gaza war. Sales increased by 300% in 2023 and the company received over 15,000 job applications.
