= Grave relief of Publius Aiedius and Aiedia =

Coordinates: 52°31′15″N 13°23′47″E

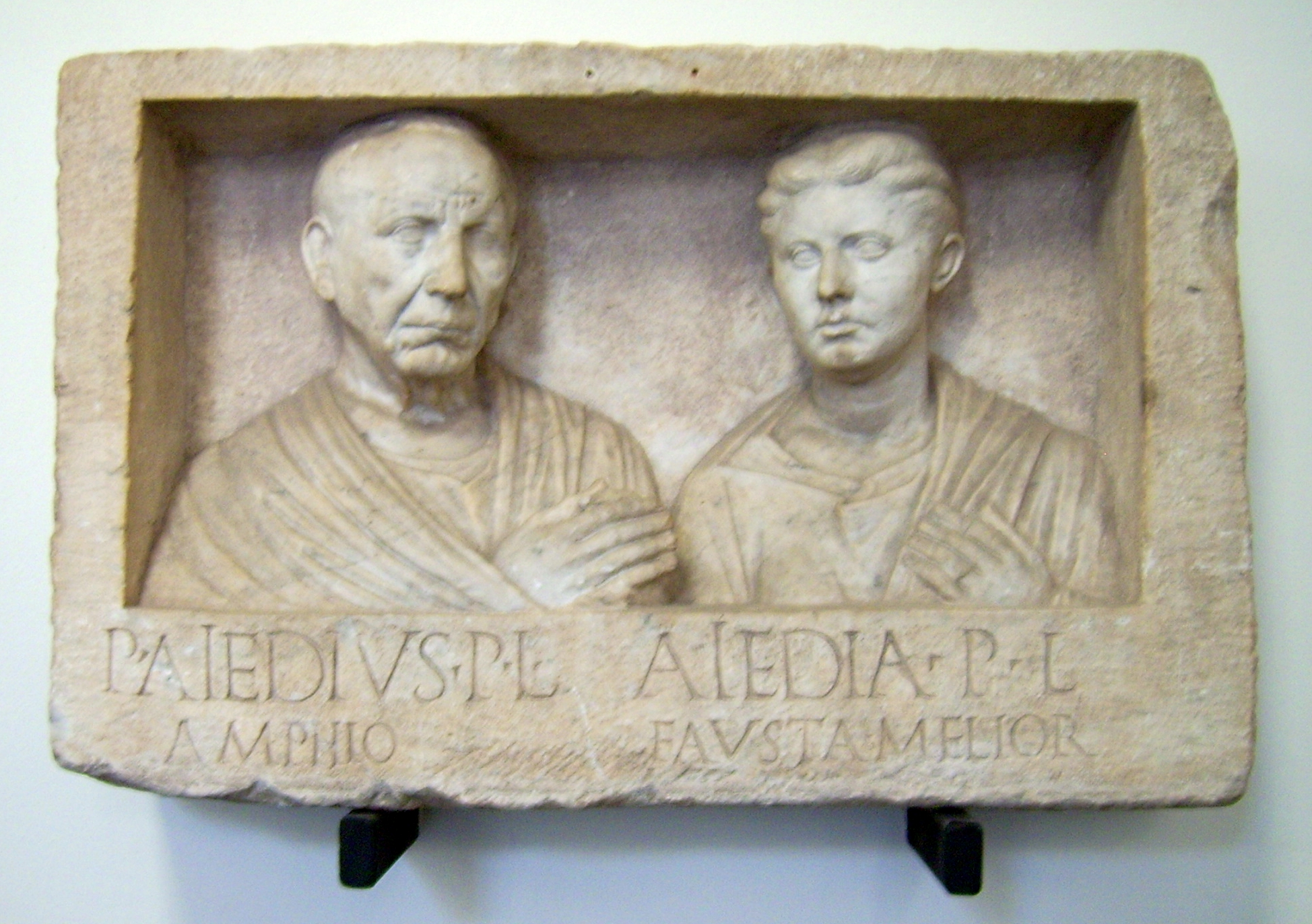

The Grave relief of Publius Aiedius and Aiedia is an ancient Roman grave relief from the first half of the first century AD, now kept in the Pergamonmuseum / Antikensammlung Berlin, with Inventory number SK 840 (R 7).

It is a 64 cm wide and 99 cm high marble plaque, which was found in Rome on the Via Appia and was purchased for the predecessor of the modern Antikensammlung Berlin in 1866.

The inscription under the relief reads:

P Aiedius P L / Amphio // Aiedia P L / Fausta Melior

— CIL VI, 11284

Translated:

Publius Aiedius Amphio, freedman of Publius // Aiedia Fausta Melior, freedwoman of Publius

Publius Aiedius Amphio is identified by the L in the inscription as a libertus or freedman of a Publius Aiedius. His slave name, the Greek name Amphio, typical for Roman slaves, is retained as his cognomen. The name of his wife, also identified as a freed slave of Publius Aiedius, was Fausta Melior. As freedmen, the pair held a form of Roman citizenship, but remained bound to their former owner, who was now their patron. They had gained the right to enter into a legal marriage and children produced from such a marriage would be normal Roman citizens.

The pair extend their hands towards the centre of the image, showing their status as a legally married couple. The wife wears two rings, indicating a degree of prosperity. Aiedia wears a chiton and cloak, Aiedius a toga, which was reserved for free citizen men. His age and bodily blemishes are also undisguised. His wrinkles are depicted, carved deep into the skin, as is his leathery skin and the warts on his forehead and around his mouth. This verism recalls traditional portraits on wax death masks. Age and its characteristics were signs of worth (dignitas) and excellence (virtus).

More than 125 reliefs of this type known. They were placed in the walls of larger grave buildings and are often found, like windows, next to doors which led into the grave building itself. The depictions "looked out" from their windows along the streets lined with tombs which led into ancient Rome.

== Bibliography ==
- Max Kunze. "Grabrelief eines römischen Ehepaares." Staatliche Museen zu Berlin. Preußischer Kulturbesitz. Antikensammlung (Ed.): Die Antikensammlung im Pergamonmuseum und in Charlottenburg. von Zabern, Mainz 1992, ISBN 3-8053-1187-7, pp. 202f.
- "Grabrelief eines römischen Ehepaares". Königliche Museen zu Berlin (Ed.), Alexander Conze (Ed): Beschreibung der antiken Skulpturen mit Ausschluss der pergamenischen Fundstücke. Spemann, Berlin 1891, urn:nbn:de:bsz:16-diglit-34567, p. 325 (Inventory no. 840).
