= Nikolaos Stournaras =

National benefactor of Greece (1806–1853)

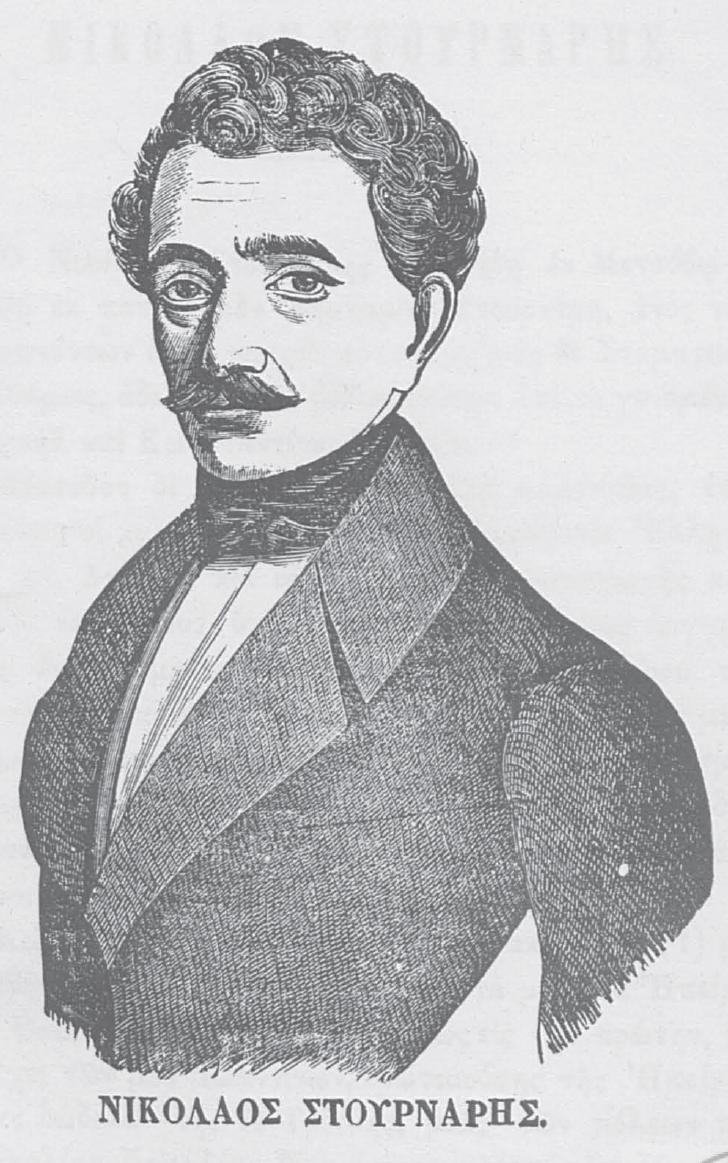
Nikolaos Stournaras

Nikolaos Stournaras (1806–1853) is one of Greece’s National Benefactors having used his wealth to donate large pieces of land to various Greek charities.

== Biography ==
He was born in Metsovo in 1806. Stournaras was an Aromanian. He was the son of Michael Tositsas’ sister. After completing his schooling in Metsovo, he went to Livorno, Grand Duchy of Tuscany, where he worked in the Tositsas family business. Then he was sent to Paris to study in the Superior School of Trade and Industry. After finishing his studies, he moved to Alexandria, Egypt where he worked as an assistant of his uncle Michael Tositsas and then as manager of the Tositsas Trading House.

His visits to the agricultural and industrial centers of Europe and his studies in European schools gave him the idea to use his vast wealth to subsidize common good projects that would contribute to the development of Greece. He purchased large parcels of land in Fthiotida and donated large amounts to educational and charity institutions in Alexandria and Athens and for the foundation of a school in Metsovo.

In 1853, he came to Greece to work on development projects but he suddenly died. His development plans included a railroad that would connect Athens to Piraeus and the establishment of a shipping company that would connect Piraeus with the Greek islands and coastal towns. In his will, he left large amounts for charity, for the schools of Metsovo and Alexandria and for the establishment of a Polytechnic school in Greece.

== Personal life ==
He was married to Henriette Isabella Thurnburn (1818-1895), daughter of Robert Thurburn (1784-1860), British consul in Alexandria, Egypt and his wife, Marizza Piozia. They had one daughter:

- Irene Stournaras (1850-1905), married Charles Edward Prior Merlin (1850-1898)
