= George Averoff =

Greek businessman and philanthropist (1815–1899)

- Γεώργιος Αβέρωφ
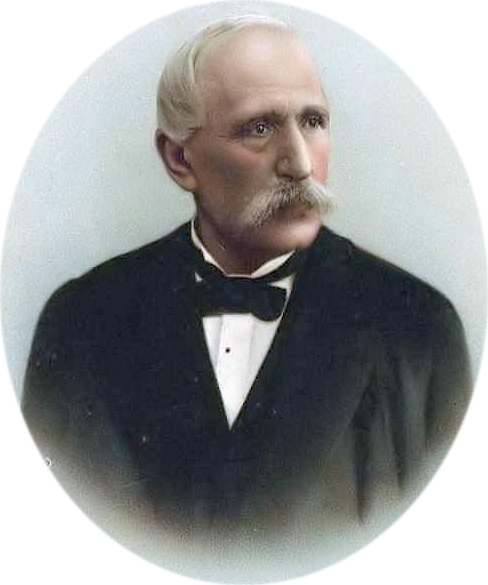
- Averoff c. 1896
- Born: August 15, 1815; Metsovo, Sanjak of Ioannina, Ottoman Empire
- Died: July 15, 1899 (aged 83); Alexandria, Egypt
- Resting place: Athens, Greece
- Occupations: Businessman; Philantrophry
- Known for: Namesake of the armored cruiser Georgios Averof

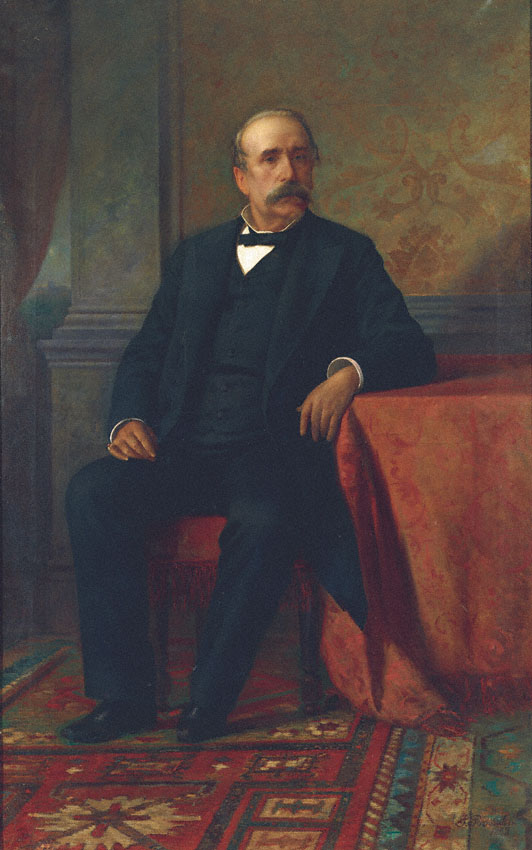
George Averoff, oil painting by Pavlos Prosalentis (1857–1894); done from a photograph.

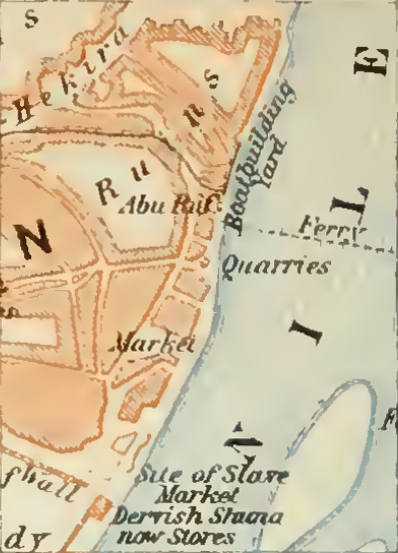
The "Abu Ruf" quarter in Omdurman, Sudan, still today named after Averoff, here on a 1914 map

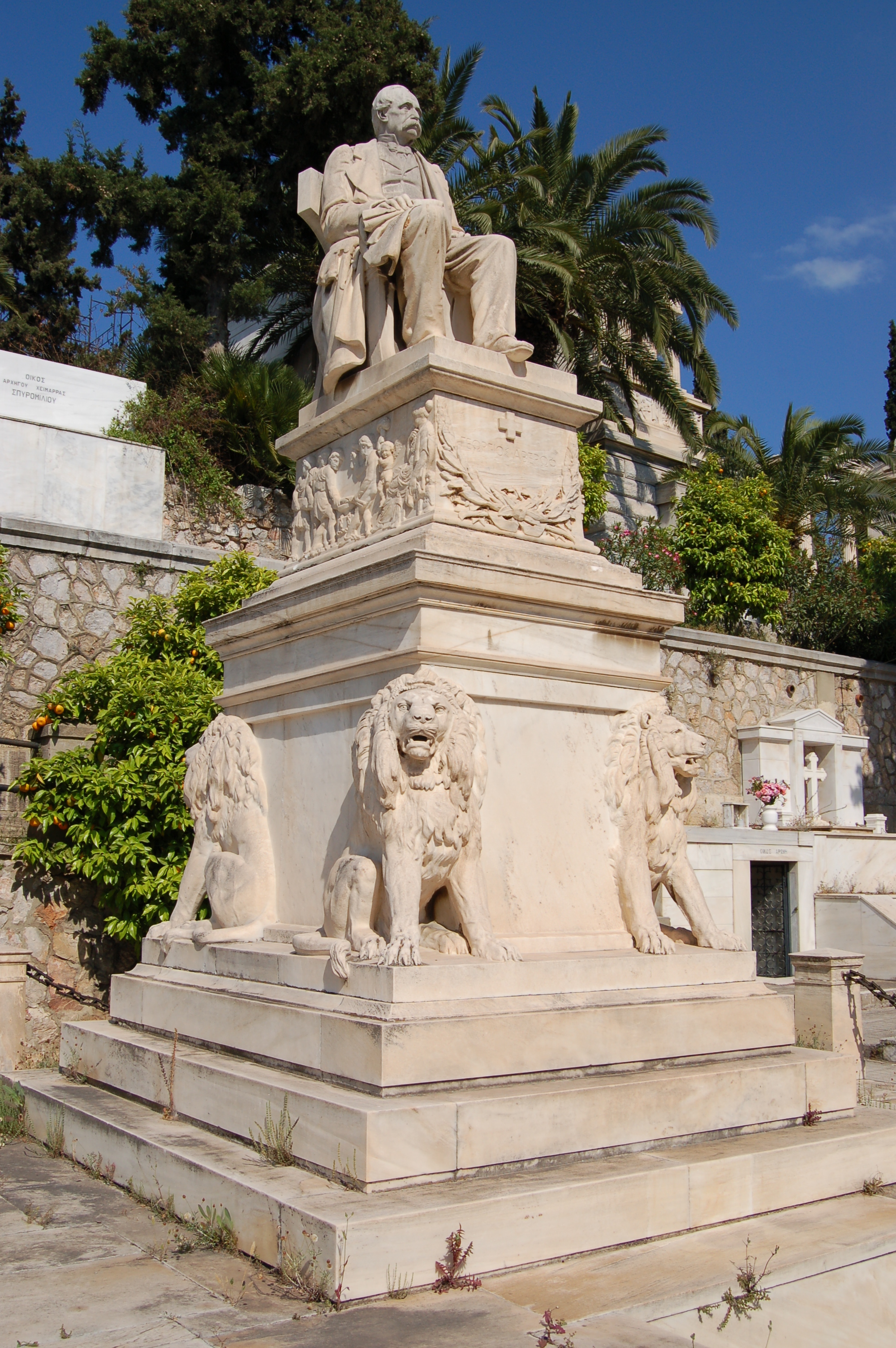
Averoff's grave in the First Cemetery of Athens.

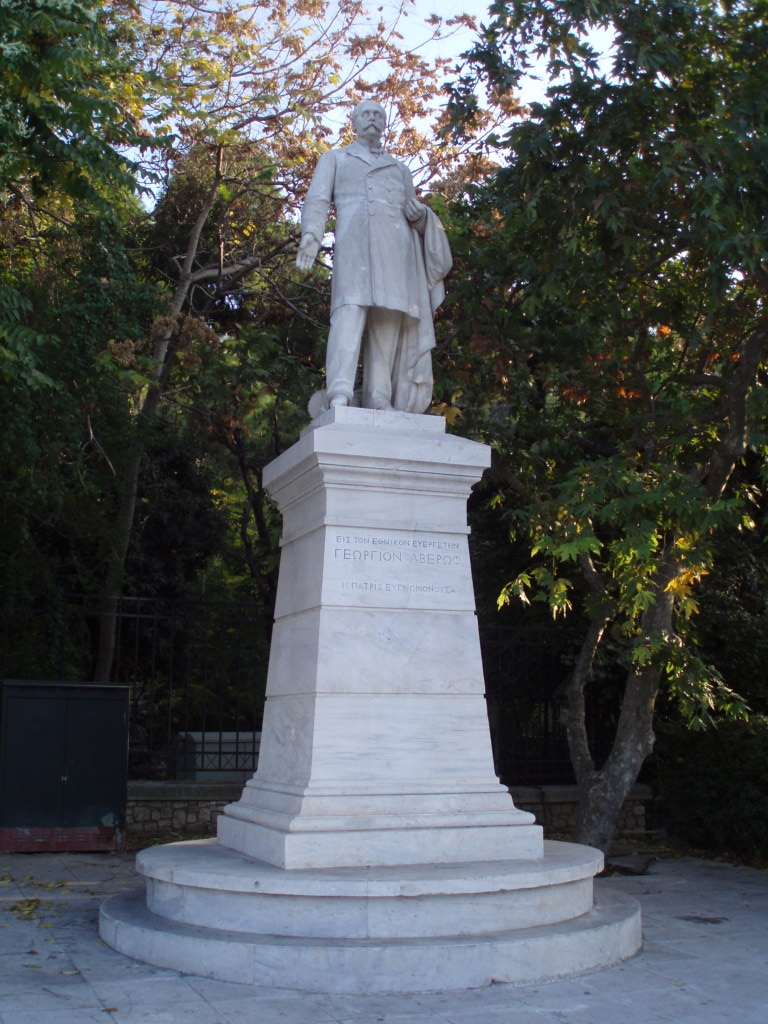
Statue commemorating Averoff in Athens

George M. Averoff (15 August 1815 – 15 July 1899), alternately Jorgos Averof or Georgios Averof (Greek: Γεώργιος Αβέρωφ), was a Greek businessman and philanthropist. He is one of the great national benefactors of Greece. Born in the town of Metsovo (Epirus, Greece, then Ottoman Empire), Averoff moved to Alexandria in his youth. He was known through most of his life for founding numerous schools in both Egypt and Greece.

== Biography ==
George Averoff was born in Metsovo in Northern Greece, into an Aromanian family. He moved to Cairo, Egypt, in 1837 to work in a shop run by his brother, Anastasios. Thanks to his bold tactics and business activities, he became the biggest merchant in Egypt. At the same time he participated in banking and real estate (buying and leasing land) while, thanks to his many riverboats travelling up and down the Nile, he managed to dominate Egypt's domestic and foreign trade.

The Greek historian Antonios Chaldeos, who has written his PhD thesis about the history of the Greeks in Sudan, says that beyond Egypt, Averoff exported Arabic gum and ivory from southern Sudan. According to the diary of Nicholas Papadam, which is part of the Sudanese archives, in 1872 George Averoff toured in all commercial centers flourished at that time (Khartoum, Sennar, Gedareff, Kasala, etc.) in order to make an investment. Finally, he chose an area in Omdurman which became the trade station of the ships that cross Nile, transferring goods from Egypt to Sudan and vice versa. However, Omdurman residents' local histories in Sudan suggest that Averoff was heavily involved in slave-trade there. In fact, the Omdurman quarter of "Abu Ruf", where historically the slave-market was situated, is still today named after him.

His business activities resulted his accumulating vast wealth, which he used to donate to charity and common good purposes. His charity work included significant donations for the development of educational and other infrastructure projects for the Greek communities of Alexandria, Metsovo, Athens and for the Greek state in general. Among them, the most notable ones were the founding of the School of Agriculture in Larisa, the construction of the Evelpidon Military Academy, the donation to the Athens Conservatory, the donation for the refurbishment of the Panathenian Stadium (raised by another two Aromanian benefactors), where the first modern Olympic Games were held, the completion of the National Technical University of Athens and the donation for building of the namesake flagship of the Greek Navy.

The restoration of the Panathenian Stadium for the 1896 Summer Olympics was done at the request of Crown Prince Constantine. The stadium was refurbished in 1895, its second refurbishment in the 19th century, using white marble from Mount Penteli pursuant to Averoff's request. The cost was initially estimated at 585,000 drachmas but eventually reached 920,000 drachmas. Averoff also served as a member of the reception committee for the foreign competitors at the Games.

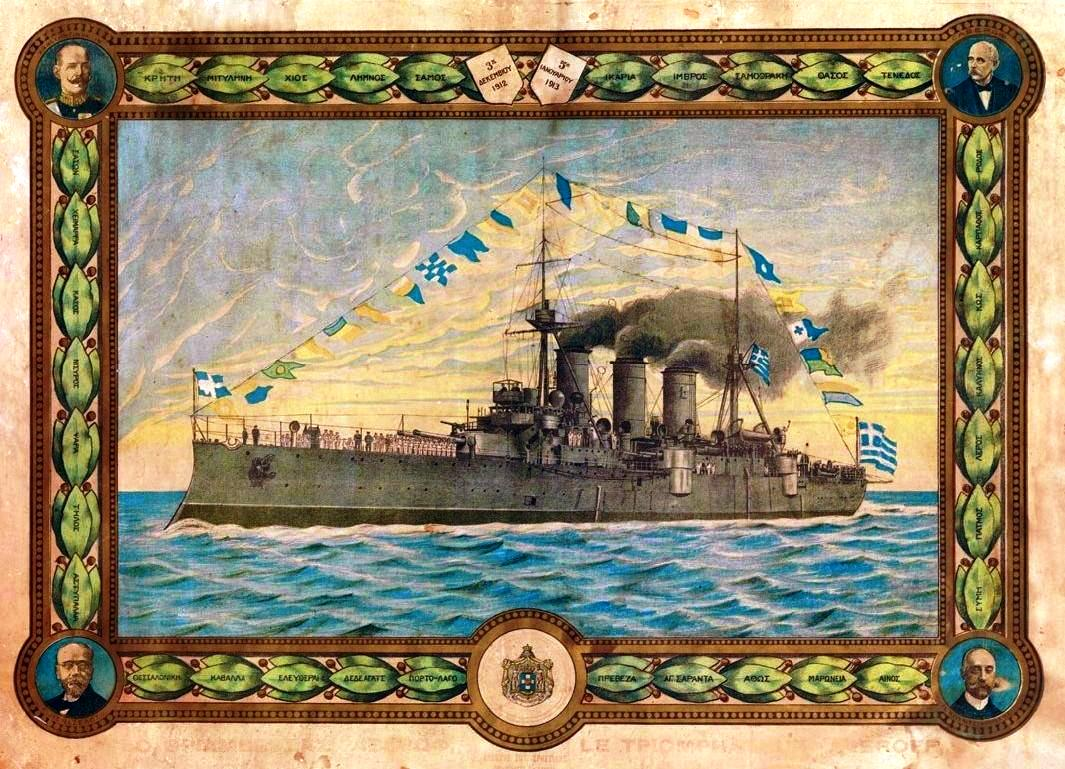
Greek cruiser Georgios Averof, lithograph by Christidis

Averoff died in Alexandria in 1899. In gratitude for his generous donations and services, the Greek state declared him a Major National Benefactor and commissioned a marble statue of him which was placed in front of the Panathenian Stadium. It remains there today. On 12 March 1910, the armoured cruiser flagship of the Hellenic Navy, Georgios Averof, was named in his honour, thanks to a bequest of 300,000 GBP (2,500,000 Gold francs) left to the navy by the terms of his Will & Testament.

== See also ==
- Greeks of Egypt

== Sources ==
- I. Chatzifotis, “Oi Metsovites stin Aleksandreia” [The Metsovites in Alexandria], Minutes of the 1st conference of Metsovite Studies, Athens 1993, pp. 87–96.
- V. Skafidas, “Istoria tou Metsovou” [History of Metsovo], Epirotiki Estia 12/131, 133 (1963), pp. 294–299, 392-396.
- G. Plataris-Tzimas, Kodikas Diathikon, Meizones kai elassones euergetes tou Metsovou [Log of Wills, Major and Minor Benefactors of Metsovo], Vol. A’, publ. of the Prefecture of Ioannina and the City of Metsovo, Metsovo/Athens 2004, pp. 288–333.
- A. Politou, O Ellinismos kai I Neotera Aigyptos, Vol. A’, I istoria tou aigyptiotou ellinismou 1798-1927 [Greeks and modern Egypt, vol A, the history of Greeks of Egypt, 1798-1927], publ. Grammata, Aleksandreia-Athens 1928-1930, 256, 258-263.
