= Michael Tositsas =

National benefactor of Greece (1787–1856)

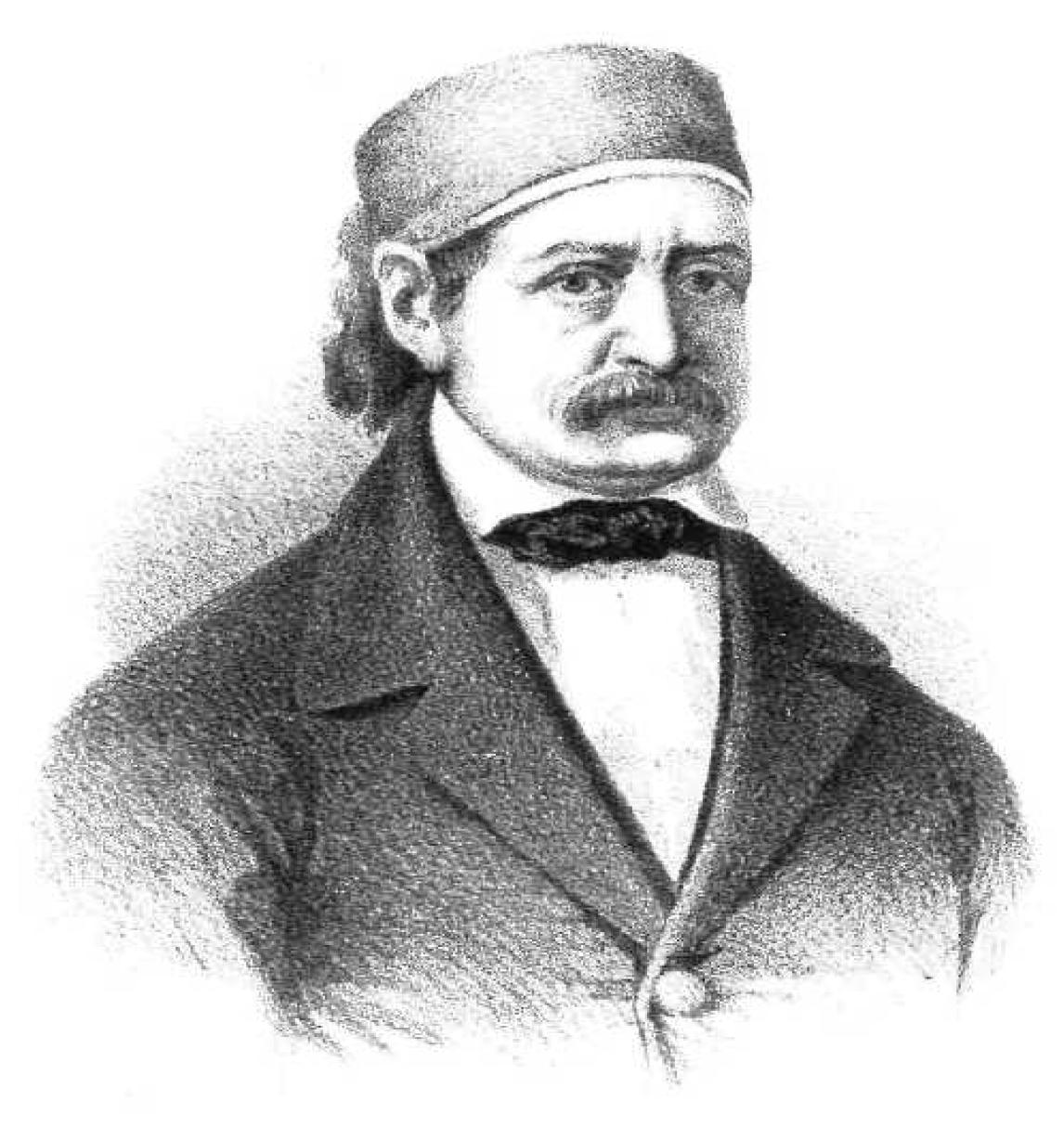
Woodblock of Michael Tositsas, 1865

Michael Tositsas (Greek: Μιχαήλ Τοσίτσας) was a national benefactor from Ottoman Greece. He was an Aromanian. He was born in Metsovo in about 1787, and in 1806 he took over his father's fur shop in Thessaloniki, together with his brothers. After developing his business significantly, he sent his brothers to Egypt to open a branch there while he opened branches in Livorno and Malta. He married Eleni Tositsa in 1818.

In 1820 he moved to Malta himself. His acquaintance with Egypt's Prince Regent Mohammed Ali resulted in the Prince taking high esteem in him and appointing him his personal advisor as well as at the helm of the first state bank, the head of the Nile Riverboat company and administrator of his land.

Tositsas, who became one of Egypt's most powerful landowners, also served as Greece's first General Consul in Alexandria and is generally regarded as the father of Hellenism of Egypt. He contributed to the establishment of the Greek Community and, together with his brothers, he helped the community develop significant educational and religious infrastructure. In 1854 he moved to Athens where he died in 1856. His charitable work was not limited to Alexandria but was equally important in Athens, Thessaloniki and his birthplace Metsovo. In his will he left vast amounts for aid for the poor and the support of hospitals, churches and schools. Among them the most notable ones are his contributions to the University of Athens, the Arsakio School and the National Technical University of Athens. After his death, his wife Eleni continued his charity work by donating large amounts to educational and charity organizations as well as for the construction and completion of the National Technical University of Athens. His younger brother, Theodore, who also became very wealthy in Egypt, returned to Greece after the liberation from the Ottomans and donated the largest part of his wealth to foundations.

== Sources ==
1. G. Plataris, “Oi Tositsides sto Livorno” [The Tositsa family in Livorno], Epirotiko Imerologio 1984, pp. 199–206.
2. A. Politou, O Ellinismos kai I Neotera Aigyptos, Vol. A’, I istoria tou aigyptiotou ellinismou 1798-1927 [Greeks and modern Egypt, vol A, the history of Greeks of Egypt, 1798-1927], publ. Grammata, Aleksandreia-Athens 1928-1930, 165-167, 172,175-176, 191-222, 237-240, 243,-247.
3. V. Skafidas, “Istoria tou Metsovou” [History of Metsovo], Epirotiki Estia 12/131, 132 (1963), pp. 194–200, 293-294
4. A. Goudas, Vioi Paralliloi ton epi tis anagenniseos tis Ellados diaprepsanton andron [Parallel lives of the men who excelled during the Renaissance, Wealth and Commerce], Vol. D’, ek tou typografeiou Ch. N. Philadelpheos, Athens 1871, 447-486.
5. I. Chatzifotis, “Oi Metsovites stin Aleksandreia” [The Metsovites in Alexandria], Minutes of the 1st conference of Metsovite Studies, Athens 1993, pp. 87–96
6. G. Plataris-Tzimas, Kodikas Diathikon, Meizones kai elassones euergetes tou Metsovou [Log of Wills, Major and Minor Benefactors of Metsovo], publ. of the Prefecture of Ioannina and the City of Metsovo, Metsovo/Athens 2004, Vol. A’, pp. 179–207, Vol. B’ pp. 203–217, Vol. C’ pp. 69–71.
