= Portrait of the Boy Eutyches =

Roman-era portrait of a boy

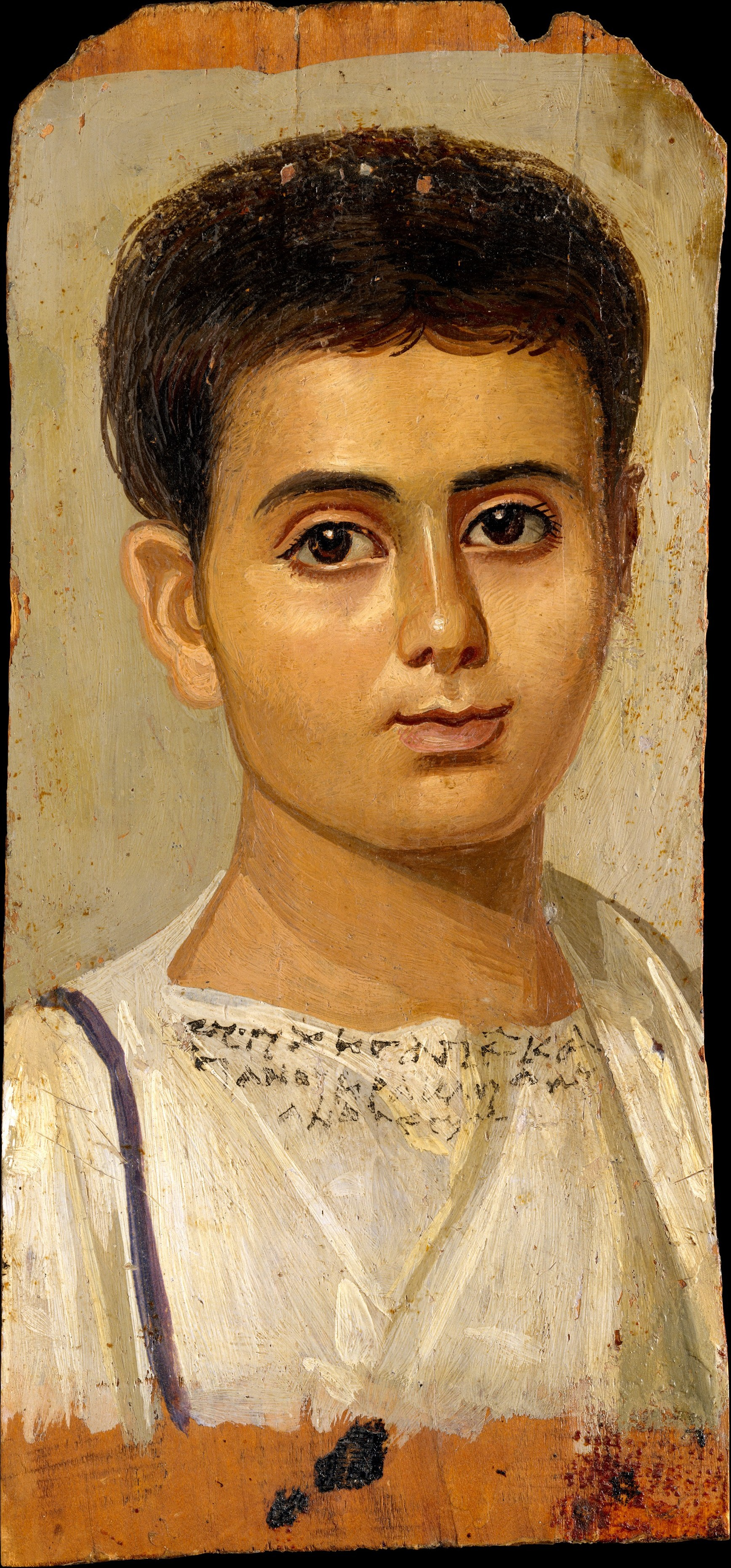
- Year: c. A.D 100-150
- Medium: Encaustic paint on wood
- Subject: Eutyches
- Dimensions: 38 cm × 19 cm (15 in × 7.5 in)
- Location: Metropolitan Museum of Art, New York

Portrait of the Boy Eutyches, also known as Portrait of Boy, is a portrait by an anonymous artist from Roman Egypt of about 100 to 150 AD. The portrait depicts a young boy, who is named as "Eutyches, freedman of Kasanios" by an inscription. It is now in the Metropolitan Museum of Art, in New York. The work was produced after the boy's death, and is classified as one of the Fayum mummy portraits.

Such mortuary portraits, attached to the burial, were popular as an artistic medium in the 1st century AD during the Roman Empire's rule over Egypt, which was dominated by an upper class of ethnic Greeks. This blending of Roman, Greek and Egyptian cultures in the imperial province of Egypt resulted in a unique art form that drew influences from Classical Greece and Egypt while at the same time utilizing materials provided by Rome's flourishing economy.

It was donated to the Metropolitan Museum of Art by Edward Harkness in 1918, and is usually on display at the museum.

== Inscription ==
The portrait includes a Greek inscription written in dark purple pigment below the neckline of the tunic. The boy is identified with the name "Eutyches" (Ancient Greek: Εὐτυχής) followed by "freedman of Kasanios". Scholars do not completely agree on whether the rest of the inscription is translated as "son of Herakleides Evandros" or "Herakleides, son of Evandros".

== Details ==
Portrait of the Boy Eutyches exemplifies a fusion of Classical Greek-inflected portrait painting methods, Roman clothing, painting materials, and the historical Egyptian reverence for the dead. The portrait, done in encaustic paint on wood panel, was intended to be placed on the face of deceased after they were mummified. Unlike some earlier mummy portraits, Portrait of the Boy Eutyches is noted to be heavily influenced by Greco-Roman artistic tradition as opposed to Egyptian.

The portrait makes use of light and dark colors coupled with broad brush strokes to model the boy's face. The olive background of the panel is used to contrast the subject's face and dark hair creating a sense of depth. The image depicted by the portrait is lit by an intra-painting light source to the boy's right; this can be inferred through the reflections present in the boy's eyes. The boy is dressed in white garb.

This manner of painting, originated in Classical Greece, is very different from the traditional Egyptian style, but its use in burials is directly related to the Egyptian beliefs about the afterlife. Paintings of this type, often referred to as Faiyum portraits, are typical products of the multicultural society of Roman Egypt.

== Bibliography ==
- Nicola Hoesch, "Mumienporträts", in Der Neue Pauly, Vol. 8 (2000), p. 464 (German)
