= Trâ Armânami Association of French Aromanians =

Aromanian cultural organization in France

- Sutsata Armânjiloru ditu Frantsa Trâ Armânami; Association des Français Aroumains Trâ Armânami
- Formation: 1978; 47 years ago
- Founder: Iancu Perifan
- Type: NGO
- Headquarters: 73, rue Galande, 75005, Paris
- Location: France
- Website: armanami.org

The Trâ Armânami Association of French Aromanians (Aromanian: Sutsata Armânjiloru ditu Frantsa Trâ Armânami; French: Association des Français Aroumains Trâ Armânami, AFA; trã Armãnami meaning "for Aromanian-dom") is an Aromanian cultural organization in France headquartered at Paris. It was founded in 1978 by Iancu Perifan.

The AFA became entangled shortly thereafter in the efforts taking place in Europe at the time for the advocation of proper rights for the Aromanians. Notably, the organization was involved in the issuance of the Council of Europe's Recommendation 1333 (1997) on Aromanian minority rights. The AFA publishes the Aromanian-language journal Trâ Armânami ("For Aromanian-dom"), and its official website, armanami.org, is a prominent Aromanian site on the Internet. The AFA inaugurated the N. C. Batzaria Aromanian Library in 2016 in Paris.

== History and activities ==
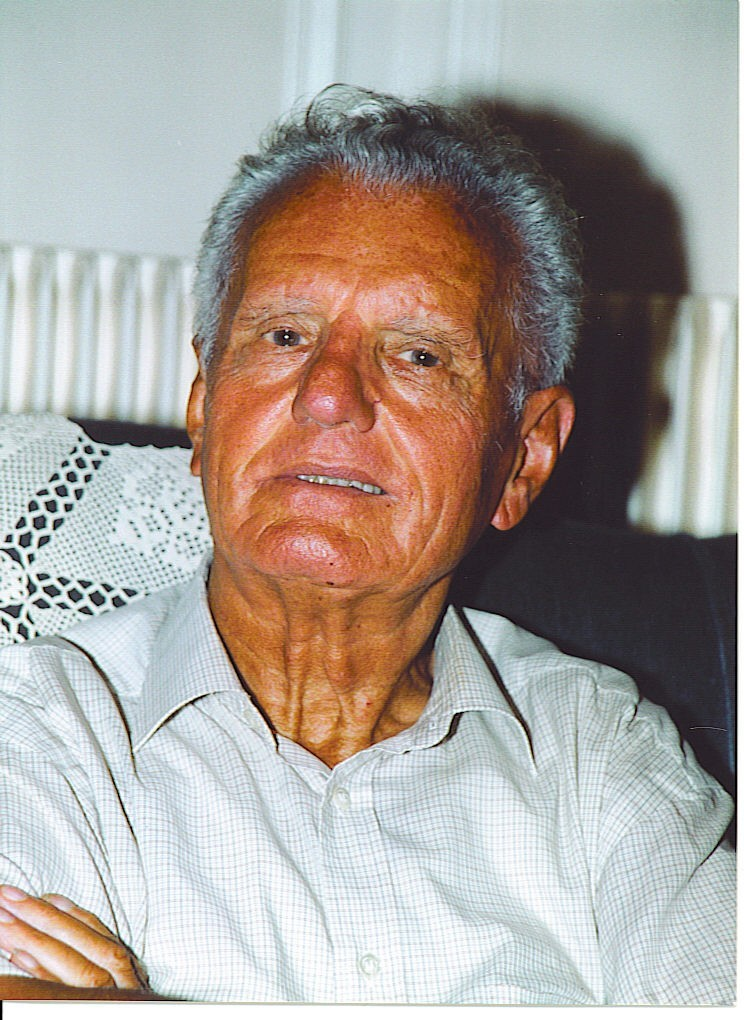
Iancu Perifan, founder and first president of the Trâ Armânami Association of French Aromanians

The Trâ Armânami Association of French Aromanians was founded in 1978 by Iancu Perifan. It is headquartered in 73, rue Galande, 75005, in Paris, France. The AFA publishes the journal Trâ Armânami ("For Aromanian-dom"), completely redacted in the Aromanian language. Perifan held the stance that the Aromanians are an ethnic group separate from the Romanians who speak a language separate from Romanian. He believed that the Aromanians should be recognized as a national minority in Romania, having even described the Aromanians in Romania as being "in exile". Having been born on 24 March 1923, Perifan died on 1 November 2019 at the age of 96 in Paris.

After its founding, the AFA quickly became involved in the efforts that were taking place in Europe at the time for the recognition of proper rights for the Aromanians. In 1980, the association sent a document on the Aromanians by the Aromanian professor Vasile Barba titled Une nation européene sans droits nationaux ("A European nation without national rights") to the Conference on Security and Co-operation in Europe (CSCE) taking place that year in Madrid, Spain. The AFA was again involved in the presentation of another document at an international conference in Strasbourg, France. Furthermore, the AFA, together with the Union for Aromanian Language and Culture (ULCA) led by Barba, consistently assisted the redaction of Lluís Maria de Puig's report submitted to the Parliamentary Assembly of the Council of Europe (PACE); following its presentation, the PACE adopted Recommendation 1333 (1997), a recommendation by the Council of Europe on Aromanian minority rights, in 1997.

In 2004, the AFA asked that the Aromanians be identified in Recommendation 1333 (1997) as makedonarmâni, combining the ethnonyms of "Aromanian" and "Macedonian" which some Aromanians alternatively use, in a request to the Council of Europe which went unreplied. This was because the AFA considered the number of people who had declared themselves Aromanians in the 2002 censuses of North Macedonia and Romania, the latter of which had allowed people to declare themselves ethnic Macedonians for the first time in the country, was too small and not in accordance with reality. According to the AFA, the population of the Aromanians is 1,500,000, a notably high estimate.

The AFA and its president Perifan were among the main sponsors of the first Aromanian-language film I'm Not Famous but I'm Aromanian (2013), directed by Toma Enache. The association helped organize the film's premiere in France which took place in Paris in 2014. Furthermore, on 10 April 2016, the AFA formally inaugurated the N. C. Batzaria Aromanian Library (Vivliutikeia Armãneascã N. C. Batzaria), named after the Aromanian cultural activist Nicolae Constantin Batzaria, in Paris. Firstly founded in 2015 by Nicolas Trifon and Niculaki Caracota, the library features books donated by Trifon, Caracota, Kira Mantsu's family and other Aromanians living in Paris.

The AFA's website, armanami.org, is a prominent Aromanian portal on the Internet and the only website for the Aromanians exclusively in the Aromanian language as of 2005. It was launched in 1999. The website features the first Aromanian news page online and has a section dedicated to Aromanian culture containing a writing course and the lyrics of several Aromanian songs. Furthermore, the website contains excerpts from the journals Zborlu a nostru ("Our Word") and Bana Armâneascâ ("Aromanian Life"). The Society Farsharotu, an Aromanian cultural organization in the United States, called it "a most refreshing and informative site!". As of 2005, the website's webmaster was Nelu Puznava, a member of the organization. Trifon was an editor of the website. Together, they received and approved the website's new articles. The aforementioned Caracota was also an important member of the association, being among its leading figures as of 2011.

== See also ==
- Aromanian diaspora
- List of Aromanian cultural organizations
