= Dumitru Pasima =

Romanian sculptor

- Born: 18 September 1935; Malovište, Yugoslavia (now in North Macedonia)
- Died: 9 August 2022 (aged 86)
- Education: Nicolae Grigorescu Fine Arts Institute
- Occupation: Sculptor
- Awards: Medal of Cultural Merit, 1st class (2004); among others

Signature
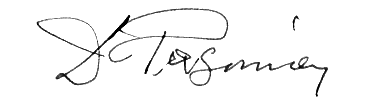

Dumitru Pasima (also Passima; 18 September 1935 – 9 August 2022) was a Romanian sculptor. An Aromanian, he was born in Malovište (Aromanian: Mulovishti) in Yugoslavia, now in North Macedonia; he left with his family at an early age. After graduating from the Nicolae Grigorescu Fine Arts Institute in Bucharest, he became a sculptor and subsequently a sculpture teacher and a member of the Visual Artists' Union of Romania (UAP).

Pasima produced a multitude of works, especially sculpture portraits of figures relevant for Romanian culture, politics, and society, but also other monumental works. His work was distinguished by his anthropocentric and ascetic approach. He and his works participated in many exhibitions and symposia in Romania and abroad, and his artistic production earned him multiple awards, including Romania's Medal of Cultural Merit.

== Personal life ==
Dumitru Pasima was born on 18 September 1935 in the village of Malovište (Aromanian: Mulovishti), then in Yugoslavia and now in North Macedonia. He was an Aromanian. The Pasima family left Malovište when he was seven. The family had previously carried the surname Papasima, as one of Pasima's grandfathers had been a priest. Pasima graduated from the sculpture section of the Nicolae Grigorescu Fine Arts Institute (now the Bucharest National University of Arts) in Bucharest in Romania in 1963, having had as teachers the Romanian sculptors Constantin Baraschi and Ion Lucian Murnu, the latter of whom was also an Aromanian. Pasima then received the Dimitrie Paciurea scholarship either in 1965 or 1971, depending on the author.

Pasima was a sculpture teacher at the Nicolae Tonitza Fine Arts High School in Bucharest and a member of the Visual Artists' Union of Romania (UAP). He was known as "Pasima" by profession colleagues and as "Tache" by his family and close people. In the Pasima family, several other members ended up becoming artists as well. Pasima's daughter Elena, whom he had with ceramist Eugenia Manea, became a prose writer and plastic artist. His niece Cristina worked with graphics, installation and urbanism; she married the French Romanian academic, editor and linguist of Aromanian descent Nicolas Trifon. His niece Lila worked at the National Museum of the Romanian Peasant in Bucharest. Oana, his niece from his sister Marica, became a restorer at the National Museum of Art of Romania, also in Bucharest. Pasima died on 9 August 2022, as Lila announced in a Facebook post.

== Artistic career ==
=== Production ===
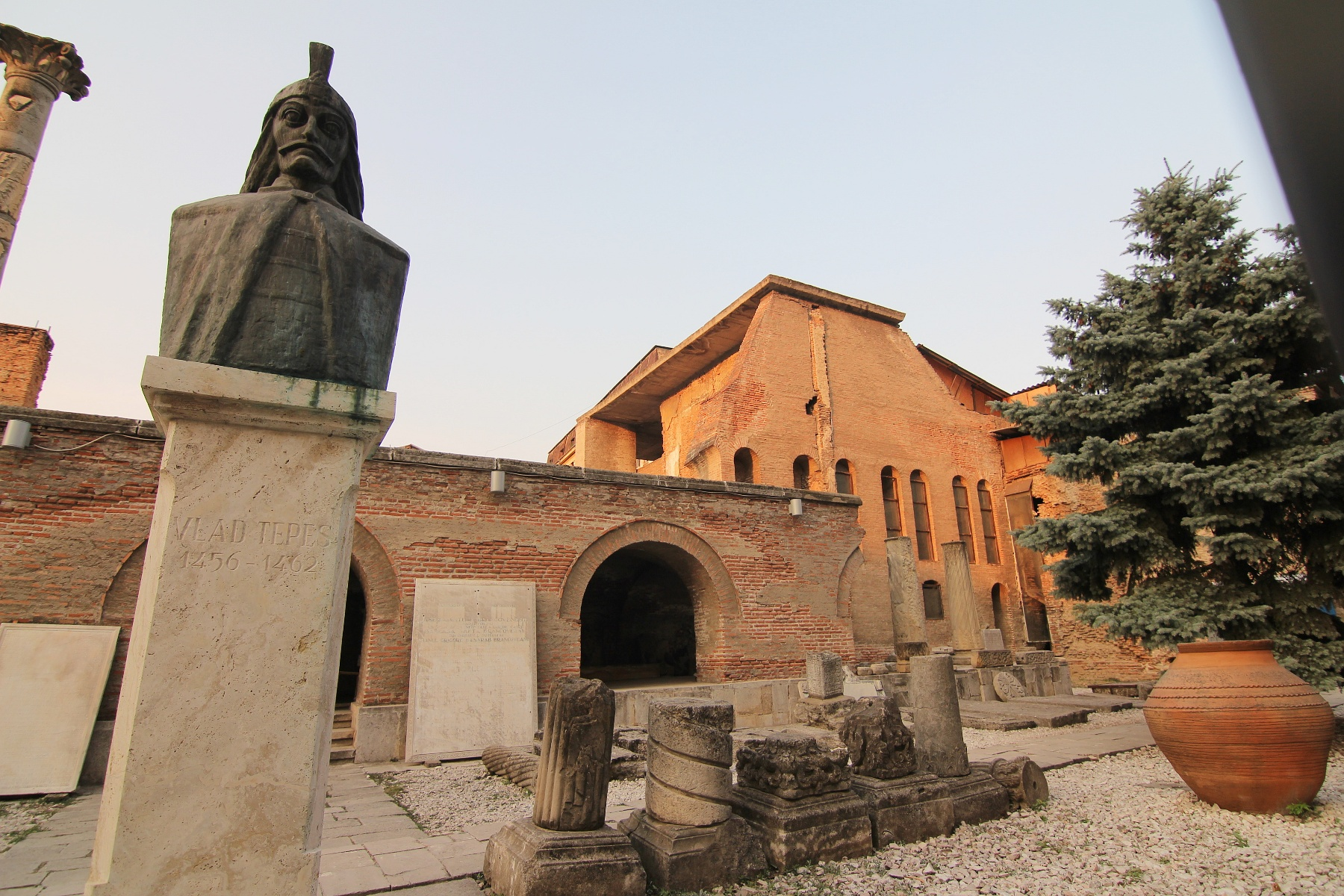
Bust by Pasima of Vlad the Impaler, Voivode of Wallachia, at the ruler's princely court of Curtea Veche, in Bucharest.

After graduating from his studies, Pasima perfected his sculpture carving technique in creative workshops in Romania and abroad. Pasima regularly participated in major exhibitions in Romania, whether annual, biennial, municipal or national. He also sent works to exhibitions of Romanian art abroad in numerous countries: Austria, Belgium, Czechoslovakia, Germany, Italy, Spain and Yugoslavia, among others. He participated in several sculpture symposia in Romania and abroad: in Brăila (with Veghe, "Vigil"), Căsoaia (with Mioritică, "Mioritic"), Măgura (with three works), Oarba de Mureș (with Cumpănă, "Balance"), all in Romania; in Burgas in Bulgaria, Prilep (Aromanian: Pãrleap) now in North Macedonia and Thessaloniki (Sãrunã) in Greece. As of 1998, Pasima had held solo exhibitions in 1966 and 1970 in Bucharest and in 1968 in Galați.

Pasima was interested in producing monumental portraits of personalities greatly important for Romanian culture and from all spheres of Romanian cultural, political and social life. His portraits include Mihai Eminescu (works located in Brăila, in Kuštilj in Serbia and in Lugoj), Ion Neculce (in Bucharest), Nae Ionescu (in Brăila), Gheorghe Petrașcu (in Tecuci), Ion Pillat (in Dorohoi), Tudor Mușatescu (in Câmpulung), Alexandru Lăpușneanu (in Blaj), Vlad the Impaler (in Bucharest) and Titu Maiorescu (in Bucharest). Pasima also produced two sculptures of his fellow villager, the Aromanian poet Constantin Belimace, author of the Aromanian anthem Dimãndarea pãrinteascã ("The Will of the Forefathers"). One is located in their native Malovište and another at the headquarters of the cultural organization Manaki Brothers Aromanian Commune in Bitola (Bituli or Bitule) in North Macedonia.

=== Style ===
Romanian art critic and art historian Constantin Prut and Romanian historian and schoolteacher Horia Truță highlighted the clear anthropocentric aspirations in Pasima's sculptures. According to Prut, Pasima had the capacity to diversify formal solutions, creating figurative constructions capable of addressing human values through symbols without necessarily resorting to the representation of characters with a precise identity. Pasima made a lot of use of sculpture portraits and the resources they offer, feeling interested by figures from the past, be they more distant (Neculce, Petru Dobra, Dinicu Golescu) or more recent to his times (Eminescu, Petrașcu, George Apostu, I. P. Negrei, Nichita Stănescu and others). According to Ukrainian Romanian researcher Ion Gherman, Pasima had the patience, interest and prowess to read the human face, producing portraits of multiple figures relevant for Romanian culture. Gherman emphasized the rigor and asceticism in his art, and as he described, Pasima asserted himself within the stylistic orbit of the Romanian sculptor, painter and photographer Constantin Brâncuși, although his style and vision took further shape over time.

Romanian researcher Corina Teacă defined his work as very varied both in terms of themes and means of expression, ranging from descriptivism to more synthetic plastic forms. Pasima worked mainly in stone and bronze, and portraits dominated his official commissions for works, an example being that of Petrașcu in Tecuci. Pasima was concerned with approaches to enhance the expressiveness of works composed by stone blocks crafted with broad gestures; this is reflected in Omagiul eroilor ("Homage to the Heroes"), located in Măgura and finished in 1974. Pasima's work covered not only portraits but also other monumental works, these being focused on conceptual structures and symbolic representation. As Prut described, these monuments, most of them produced in sculpture symposia, in space open to the public, carry volumetric equations derived from an archetypal character that allow them to evade their erosion by time. In his works in Burgas, Măgura and Prilep, Pasima stylized and reduced the human silhouette until abstracting it as a sign, this purified symbol then being reincarnated with figurative suggestions, respecting the geometric rigors necessary for abstract art.

Romanian art critic and university professor Alexandra Titu described Pasima's sculpture Șotronul ("The Hopscotch") as a beautiful and simple work designed in perfect harmony with its space, highlighting its anthropomorphic allusions, its informed symmetries and the way in which the vertical section of the construction reflected itself into the horizontal section of it as if it was its own projected shadow. Pasima's Semn pentru Miorița ("Sign for Miorița"), located in Viștea and finished in 1980, bases its theme on the famous Romanian folk pastoral ballad Miorița ("The Little Ewe Lamb"), featuring the dramatic moment in which the mother discovers the inert body of her murdered son. The work presents the silhouette of the two characters conceptualized with an expression universally signifying pain, also transmitting pity and love. The entire construction takes the shape of a wayside cross, revealing clear Christian connotations.

Pasima's Trecere ("Passage"), also in Viștea and finished in 1984, features a negative shape, melted into the grass, potentially inspired from saints from the frieze of a Byzantine church. In Truță's view, the ascetic simplicity of the elongated body, the size of which is not defined, conveys a subtle message of piety and gives the sculpture's site the grandeur characteristic of monasteries, with the work representing a finding over time of glorious traditions supported by an undying faith. Romanian artist, theorist and curator Călin Dan portrayed Trecere as providing, with masterful simplicity, not a sculpture, but the absence of it. Interpreting the work, Dan described not only a human silhouette melted into the grass, but also a keyhole to a door leading to the infernal worlds.

=== Recognition ===
For his artistic production, Pasima was awarded a mention at the Youth Exposition in 1968, the UAP's collective prize for participating at the 1971 symposium in Măgura, the I Prize at the 1976 International Symposium in Burgas, the UAP's Prize for Sculpture in 1991, the bronze medal at the 12th edition of the Dantesca contest in Ravenna in Italy in 1996, the jubilee medal at the 13th edition of the same competition in 1998, the Eminescu 2000 anniversary medal in 2000, the Ion Andreescu Award from the Romanian Academy in 2003 and the 1st class of Romania's state Medal of Cultural Merit in 2004. As of 2012, works by Pasima were present at the museum of the George Apostu Culture Center in Bacău, at the Vasile Pârvan Museum in Bârlad, at the Bucharest Municipality Museum in Bucharest, at the Museum of Visual Arts in Galați and at the Stephen the Great County Museum in Vaslui.

Furthermore, Pasima was represented by three of his works, including a portrait sculpture of Romanian engineer and inventor Henri Coandă and a monument project, at the first ever auction of art works featuring together Aromanian artists, whether masters or disciples, from all generations of modern and contemporary Romanian art. The auction took place on 30 June 2014, at the Goldart auction house in Bucharest. While also including non-Aromanians, the auction's Aromanian artists section, a premiere on the Romanian art market, also represented Pasima's daughter Elena, as well as other notable Aromanian artists or artists of Aromanian descent, including, among others, Theodor Aman, Sever Burada, Geta Caragiu, Ary Murnu, Ion Lucian Murnu, Gheorghe Naum, Ion Pacea and Florica Prevenda.
