= Aromanian nationalism =

Ideology defending the notion of the Aromanians as a nation

Flag of the Aromanians

Aromanian nationalism (Aromanian: Natsionalismu armãneascu) is the ideology asserting the Aromanians as a distinct nation. A large number of Aromanians have moved away from nationalist themes such as the creation of a nation state of their own or achieving ethnic autonomy in the countries they live. Despite this, an ethnic-based identity and pride is prevalent in them. In history, Aromanian nationalists often found themselves divided into pro-Greek factions and pro-Romanian ones.

The repeated persecution, attacks and murders against the Aromanians by Greek and Bulgarian gangs in the Ottoman Empire fueled the nationalism of the Aromanians, which was further promoted by the works of some Aromanians in Romania. In 1917, during the presence of Italian troops in Greece in World War I, a group of Aromanian nationalists attempted the creation of an Aromanian state, backed by Romania. However, the Italian troops eventually withdrew, and the Greek authorities subsequently chased these figures.

Such a project was revived in World War II after the Axis invasion of Greece, and a Principality of the Pindus was established in 1941, being led by the Aromanian nationalist Alcibiades Diamandi. Despite lacking any real political power, this principality had its own military forces, the Roman Legion, which collaborated with fascist Italian and Nazi German forces. Aromanian was made the official language, the use of Greek was prohibited and the formation of an Aromanian parliament was attempted. However, the Axis forces retreated and the Greek resistance, with several Aromanian members, took over the region in 1944.

Aromanian nationalism has focused greatly in Moscopole. Moscopole was a prosperous city in the Ottoman Empire with a large Aromanian population that was largely devastated and destroyed in the second half of the 18th century. With the birth of Aromanian literature, many Aromanian writers, predominantly those young Aromanians educated in Romanian schools, began to write about Moscopole in a utopian way, with feelings and elements such as love, nostalgia, superstitions, mentalities, emotions and everyday aspects of life being predominant. Depression and nostalgia for the city became the main feelings in this Aromanian literary phenomenon. Romanian historian Sorin Antohi described the Aromanian elites engaging in this utopic literary discourse about Moscopole as having an exalted feeling of finding of a "magnetic beauty and without any imperfection of a brilliant city" which "evokes a dreamlike image". The founder of this Aromanian literary trend was Leon Boga, but it also includes works by Nicolae Constantin Batzaria, Nicolae Caratană, Ion Foti, Kira Mantsu and Nicolae Velo.

Today, a common Aromanian phrase expressing ethnic pride is S-bãneadzã Armãnamea ("Long live Aromanian-dom"). Another famous phrase is Armãnlu nu cheari ("The Aromanian [person] does not perish").

== See also ==
- Aromanian question
