= Nicolas Trifon =

Romanian-born academic, editor and linguist in France

- Born: Sorin Cătălin Edmond Nicolae Dumnorix Mihai Trifon; 29 May 1949; Bucharest, Romania
- Died: 18 August 2023 (aged 74); Paris, France
- Occupations: Academic, editor, linguist, proofreader

Academic background
- Education: University of Bucharest; School for Advanced Studies in the Social Sciences
- Thesis: Des blagues: masses parlantes et rhétorique marxiste-léniniste de pouvoir (1983)

Nicolas Trifon (born Sorin Cătălin Edmond Nicolae Dumnorix Mihai Trifon; 29 May 1949 – 18 August 2023) was a Romanian-born academic, editor and linguist in France of partial Aromanian descent. Born in Bucharest and having studied at the University of Bucharest, he moved in 1977 to Paris, France, where he completed a linguistics doctorate at the School for Advanced Studies in the Social Sciences (EHESS).

Trifon had a prolific intellectual production. He published several anarchist works, was an editor at the French-language online newspaper Le Courrier des Balkans and authored research works about Moldova and the Aromanians. Trifon was a major specialist in the Aromanians, having written several books about them. He saw himself involved in Aromanian activist initiatives and was a member of the Trâ Armânami Association of French Aromanians (AFA).

== Biography ==
Nicolas Trifon was born as Sorin Cătălin Edmond Nicolae Dumnorix Mihai Trifon on 29 May 1949 in Bucharest, Romania. His father was an economist while his mother was a pediatrician. He was of ethnic Aromanian descent on his father's side, with origins from the Aromanian village of Malovište (Aromanian: Mulovishti) today in North Macedonia.

Trifon studied at the Faculty of Romance, Classical and Oriental Languages (today the Faculty of Foreign Languages and Literatures) of the University of Bucharest with a specialization on the French language. He then studied a doctorate at the School for Advanced Studies in the Social Sciences (EHESS) in Paris, France, which allowed him to move to the city in 1977 in the view of the increasingly authoritarian government of Nicolae Ceaușescu over Communist Romania. In 1983, Trifon finished his PhD thesis on linguistics at the EHESS. Titled Des blagues: masses parlantes et rhétorique marxiste-léniniste de pouvoir ("Jokes: Talking Masses and Marxist–Leninist Rhetoric of Power"), it dealt with the rigid language often used by totalitarian regimes. Trifon would travel to the countries of the Eastern Bloc but also to Latin America, living for some time in Mexico. In December 1989, Trifon went to Bucharest to witness the Romanian revolution that toppled Romania's communist regime.

In 2021, Trifon was diagnosed with cancer and pulmonary fibrosis, which would ultimately lead to his death in the morning of 18 August 2023 in Paris, having lived his last months in his house in the neighborhood of Butte-aux-Cailles. He was outlived by his artist wife Cristina Passima Trifon, niece of the Romanian Aromanian sculptor Dumitru Pasima; as well as by his daughter Laurie and three grandchildren.

== Work ==
Trifon was a proofreader and member of the trade union of proofreaders CGT Correcteurs. He was a regular collaborator of the French anarchist radio station Radio Libertaire. From 1983 to 1991, Trifon was the director of the anarchist journal Iztok, the staff of which was composed at the time of Eastern European exiles. He published several articles in the French-language online newspaper Le Courrier des Balkans, having been secretary of the newspaper's publisher for some time. Several of his articles in the newspaper were republished in its Central European equivalent Le Courrier d'Europe centrale.

As a linguist, Trifon wrote a book focused on Moldova together with the French Romanian historian Matei Cazacu. Titled La République de Moldavie, un État en quête de nation ("The Republic of Moldova, a state in search of nation"), it was published in 2010 by the French publishing house Éditions Non Lieu.

=== Aromanian research and activism ===
Trifon researched extensively on the Aromanians, with Le Courrier d'Europe centrale defining him as "the best specialist in France of the Aromanian people". He started his research in 1993 with the publication of Les Aroumains, un cas de figure national atypique dans les Balkans ("The Aromanians, an atypical case of national figure in the Balkans") by the French publishing house Acratie. Starting from the same year, Trifon would participate in activities of the Aromanian diaspora for the recognition of proper rights for the Aromanians living in their native countries, which include Albania, Bulgaria, Greece, North Macedonia and Romania. In 2005, Trifon published the book Les Aroumains, un peuple qui s'en va ("The Aromanians, a people on the move"). In 2007, an article by Trifon titled Les Aroumains en Roumanie depuis 1990: comment se débarrasser d'une (belle-)mère patrie devenue encombrante ("The Aromanians in Romania since 1990: how to get rid of a (step)mother country that has become cumbersome"), treating the Aromanian minority in Romania, was published in the French journal Revue d'études comparatives Est-Ouest.

In 2012, the Moldovan publishing house Editura Cartier published Trifon's book Aromânii. Pretutindeni, nicăieri ("Aromanians. Everywhere, nowhere"), in which he discussed sensitive topics about the Aromanians such as their origins. Ovidius University associate professor Enache Tușa argued that Trifon made a relevant and comprehensive analysis on the situation of the Aromanians in the Balkan countries in which they live and that this was possible because he wrote his book in France, free from any political or institutional pressure often present in these Balkan countries. In 2014, Editura Cartier published the book by Trifon Unde e Aromânia? Interventii, dezbateri, cronici, 1994–2014 ("Where is Aromania? Interventions, debates, chronicles, 1994–2014"). In the book, among other things, Trifon attempted to answer a rhetorical question that the Romanian Aromanian actor, director and politician Ion Caramitru asked himself during a 2011 television broadcasting of where a country called "Aromania" was located.

Trifon was an editor of armanami.org, the official website of the Trâ Armânami Association of French Aromanians (AFA). He received and approved the website's new articles together with the website's webmaster Nelu Puznava. In 2015, together with Niculaki Caracota, Trifon founded the N. C. Batzaria Aromanian Library (Vivliutikeia Armãneascã N. C. Batzaria), named after the Aromanian cultural activist Nicolae Constantin Batzaria, in Paris. It was later formally inaugurated by the AFA on 10 April 2016. Trifon was among the Aromanian figures living in Paris that donated books to the library.
