= Recommendation 1333 (1997) =

Recommendation on Aromanian minority rights by the Council of Europe

Recommendation 1333 (1997) on the Aromanian culture and language, often simply referred to as Recommendation 1333 (1997) (Aromanian: Recomandarea 1333 (1997) or Dimãndarea 1333 (1997)), is a recommendation on Aromanian minority rights by the Council of Europe. It was voted unanimously by the Parliamentary Assembly of the Council of Europe on 24 June 1997 and formally adopted by the Council of Europe on 15 June 1999. Recommendation 1333 (1997) was issued following the efforts of the Union for Aromanian Language and Culture (ULCA) and its founder and president at the time Vasile Barba, and aimed to improve the ethnic rights of the Aromanians on the countries in which they live. Though considered a great success for the Aromanians, it failed to be implemented appropriately in most of the countries it was supposed to.

== History ==
The Aromanians are a stateless Romance-speaking ethnic group living scattered throughout the Balkans. They live primarily in Albania and Greece but also in Bulgaria, North Macedonia, Romania and Serbia, with an Aromanian diaspora notorious in size. In 1985, the Union for Aromanian Language and Culture (ULCA) was founded by Aromanian professor Vasile Barba in Freiburg, West Germany. This organization was founded with the aim of defending and preserving the minority rights of the Aromanians. The activism of the ULCA was initially limited to Western Europe, spreading to the Eastern European countries in which most Aromanians live after the Revolutions of 1989 that brought an end to communism and a democratic system to the region.

By 1993, the ULCA had held its third congress, in which a resolution calling for the legal recognition of the Aromanians as a minority group in all the countries in which they live natively was adopted. The resolution also demanded the promotion of education at all levels in the Aromanian language and the use of the language in churches and press in their native countries. Following this, the leadership of the ULCA began to seek the implementation of this resolution. For this, Barba made an appeal to the European Council and the European Parliament presenting the precarious situation of the Aromanians in their home countries.

The efforts of Barba and the ULCA were well-received, and the Parliamentary Assembly of the Council of Europe commissioned Giulio Ferrarini, an Italian politician then member of cultural bodies of the Council of Europe, to carry out research on the situation of the Aromanians and submit a resolution to the Parliamentary Assembly. The "Ferrarini" draft resolution, which incited the defense of the Aromanian language, was adopted by the Parliamentary Assembly on 3 May 1994, being signed by representatives of France, Italy, Portugal, San Marino and Romania.

Following this, member of the Parliament of Spain Lluís Maria de Puig was appointed as rapporteur on the issue of the Aromanians by the Committee on Culture, Science and Education, a European Parliament committee. After having conducted three years of research, on 24 June 1997, de Puig presented the report Document 7728 to the Parliamentary Assembly for debate during its 18th sitting. The ULCA and the Trâ Armânami Association of French Aromanians (AFA) consistently assisted the redaction of this report. On the same day, Recommendation 1333 (1997) on the Aromanian culture and language was voted unanimously by the Parliamentary Assembly.

The recommendation notes the critical situation of the Aromanians and the danger their language and culture face, and is primarily directed at the Balkan countries in which the Aromanians live. Among other things, these countries are called upon to ratify the European Charter for Regional or Minority Languages, introduce Aromanian-language church services and education, help with the publication of Aromanian newspapers and magazines, provide Aromanian-language television and radio broadcasting, and give support to Aromanian cultural organizations. The recognition of the Aromanians as an ethnic minority was not demanded as de Puig intended to avoid political controversies and focus the recommendation purely on the cultural field as he would later explain.

Recommendation 1333 (1997) was formally adopted by the Council of Europe on 15 June 1999.

== Aftermath ==
Recommendation 1333 (1997) is one of the greatest achievements of the struggle for the ethnic rights of the Aromanians in the international arena. It served as the greatest hope and instrument of pressure against governments for the Aromanians during the 1990s. However, in time it would prove to be a great disappointment. In the first place, the recommendation was not legally binding, and with the Aromanians lacking a leadership or central organization, they could not organize an effort to ensure its implementation. According to representatives of the ULCA, only Romania and North Macedonia appropriately implemented the recommendation. Recommendation 1333 (1997) thus had virtually no real impact. Still, the recommendation is to this day commonly quoted by Aromanians whenever they demand further minority rights or an improvement of their situation to their respective governments.

In Greece, Recommendation 1333 (1997) was received very negatively by the Panhellenic Federation of Cultural Associations of Vlachs, the largest Aromanian cultural organization in Greece and in the world. This organization has repeatedly protested against the notion of the Greek Aromanians as an ethnic minority in Greece. Nevertheless, the resolution was received positively by the Greek Helsinki Monitor and the Greek branch of Minority Rights Group International.
