= UASK =

UASK may refer to:

- Oskemen Airport
- Union for Aromanian Language and Culture, or Union für Aromunische Sprache und Kultur in German
