= Armãnamea =

Armãnamea may refer to:

- an Aromanian-language word standing for the totality of the Aromanian people, also spelled Armânamea
- Armânamea, a football team composed of Aromanian players from Romania that participates in Europeada tournaments
- Armãnamea, the main female character in the 2013 film I'm Not Famous but I'm Aromanian
- S-bãneadzã Armãnamea ("Long live Aromanian-dom"), a popular Aromanian ethnic prideful phrase

== See also ==
- Trâ Armânami Association of French Aromanians, an Aromanian cultural organization in France; trã Armãnami means "for Aromanian-dom", and Armãnamea is the definite articulated form of Armãnami
