= Society Farsharotu =

Aromanian cultural organization in the United States

- Logo of the Society Farsharotu
- Formation: 1903; 122 years ago
- Founder: Nicolae Cican
- Type: NGO
- Headquarters: Trumbull, Connecticut
- Location: United States
- Website: Official website

The Society Farsharotu, officially the Aromanian Cultural Society Farsharotu, is an organization of Aromanians in the United States, with its headquarters at Trumbull, Connecticut. The Aromanians are a Balkan ethnic group scattered over many countries in the region. These are Albania, Bulgaria, Greece, North Macedonia, Romania and Serbia. The organization was formerly named the "Sperantsa Romanian Society of Help and Culture" and the "Romanian Cultural and Benevolent Society Farsarotul".

The Society Farsharotu was the first Aromanian association in the United States and it was founded in 1903 by Nicolae Cican and other Aromanian emigrants from Albania, the north of Greece and Serbia. The Aromanians are divided into several subgroups, one of them being the Farsherots, whose name comes from the village of Frashër in Albania. The Society Farsharotu publishes The Newsletter of the Society Farsharotu twice a year. It is available on the website of the association.

== See also ==
- Aromanian diaspora
- Aromanian question
- List of Aromanian cultural organizations
