= Flag of the Aromanians =

Unofficial ethnic flag

- Use: Unofficial ethnic flag
- Proportion: Square or rectangle
- Design: A white background with a blue outline near the edges; a white circle in the center outlined in blue and crossed by blue stripes of varied directions

The flag of the Aromanians (Aromanian: Flãmbura a armãnjilor) is an unofficial ethnic flag used by some of the Aromanians, an ethnic group from the Balkans. They are scattered in Albania, Bulgaria, Greece, North Macedonia, Romania and Serbia and their estimates range from 350,000 to 3 million people. There is no official Aromanian entity in any of these countries.

== Description ==
The flag is a white field with a blue outline near the edges. A white circle in the center is outlined in blue and crossed by blue stripes of varied directions. Aromanians from other countries also have their own versions of this flag. Furthermore, during the Paris Peace Conference of 1919 and 1920, the Aromanians used a horizontal flag composed of five stripes: red, yellow, pale blue, yellow and black.

In some cases and among some groups, the flag is considered "holy" and there are strict rules about its use in weddings. The flag is esteemed and rules are expected to be followed.

== Variations ==
The following are some historical or traditional flags used by the Aromanians:

Traditional flag of the Aromanians, modernized

Flag of the Aromanians during the Paris Peace Conference

== See also ==
- Flag of Albania
- Flag of Greece
- Flag of North Macedonia
- Flag of Romania
- Flag of Moldova
