= List of Aromanian cultural organizations =

The Aromanians, a stateless Romance-speaking ethnic group in the Balkans, have often organized themselves into cultural organizations to preserve their culture and identity. Today, there is a large number of Aromanian cultural organizations in the countries in which they live.

== List of Aromanian cultural organizations ==
=== Albania ===
The first Aromanian cultural organizations in Albania appeared in 1991, in Korçë and Selenicë. German researcher Thede Kahl reported in 2002 that almost every town in central and southern Albania had an Aromanian association, and that in many cases, two different associations, not always officially registered, had emerged in the same place due to differing views.

- Aromanians of Albania – Headquartered in Tirana. As of 2002, it grouped eight Aromanian cultural organizations from southern Albania and was the largest Aromanian association in the country.
- Association of Helleno-Vlachs of Albania – Headquartered in Korçë. The association facilitates the obtaining of work permits and visas to Greece and the accession into Greek universities for Aromanians with a Greek identity.
- Juvenile Union of Aromanian Scholars of Albania – Founded in 2001.

=== Bulgaria ===
Because the number of Aromanians in Bulgaria is low, there are few Aromanian ethnic organizations in the country, with the first having been established in Sofia. There also are such organizations in Dupnitsa, Peshtera and Velingrad. According to Kahl, most settlements in Bulgaria with Aromanian inhabitants have Aromanian folklore groups.

- Society of the Aromanians of Sofia – The strongest supporters of the society are Aromanians who studied with Romanians at the Romanian school in Sofia, who are "the ones who work hardest for the conservation of Aromanian culture and language". The society publishes the newspaper Armânlu ("The Aromanian").

=== Greece ===
As of 2002, there were over 200 Aromanian organizations in Greece, many not officially registered. None of them had a name in Aromanian at the time, and most did not have the word "Vlach", the common name used to refer to the Aromanians in the country, in their names.

- Panhellenic Federation of Cultural Associations of Vlachs – The largest Aromanian cultural organization in Greece and in the world. As of 2001, 101 associations were members of the federation, and it had branches in Agrinio, Athens, Drama, Grevena, Metsovo and Thessaloniki. The federation was established in 1985.
- Aromanian/Vlach Culture – Headquartered in Athens. Distributes books with Aromanian songs and small information pamphlets in Greek.
- League of Vlach Students – Formed by Aromanian students in Thessaloniki.
- Association of Helleno-Vlachs of Albania in Greece – Headquartered in Thessaloniki. Members are Aromanian migrants from Albania to Greece.

=== North Macedonia ===
The first Aromanian associations in what is now North Macedonia were founded in Bitola and Skopje in the 1970s, when North Macedonia was part of Yugoslavia. However, more notorious activities from these associations started only in the early 1990s, when North Macedonia became independent and efforts for the ethnic revitalization of the Aromanians intensified.

- League of Vlachs – As of 2002, 12 local Aromanian organizations were part of the league. The league organizes Aromanian activities and sometimes collaborates with the Government of Romania and the Romanian embassy in Skopje.
- Union for Culture of the Aromanians of Macedonia – As of 2015, it was led by the Aromanian publicist, translator and writer Dina Cuvata.
- Society of Aromanian Women – Headquartered in Skopje.
- Mbeala Aromanian Society – Headquartered in Struga.
- Aromanian Society of Kruševo – Headquartered in Kruševo.
- World League of the Aromanians – Founded in Bitola in 1996. It focuses on the organization of cultural and folkloric activities such as festivals and the publication of Aromanian books and tapes.
- Pitu Guli – Headquartered in Skopje.
- Moschopolis – Headquartered in Skopje. It split off from the Pitu Guli association in 1999. It is composed of Aromanians, the vast majority from Kruševo, with a Greek identity.

=== Romania ===
The history of Aromanian organizations in Romania is relatively long, with many of the first ones having been founded to represent Romania's interests in the Aromanian question. Many new Aromanian associations appeared in the country in the 1990s with the aim of preserving Aromanian folklore, identity, language and traditions. Furthermore, there are Aromanian folklore groups in almost every village in Romania with an Aromanian population.

- Macedo-Romanian Cultural Society – Headquartered in Bucharest. It initiated most of the early Aromanian newsletters and newspapers, as well as the Meglenia Cultural Society for the Megleno-Romanians.
- Aromanian Community of Romania – In April 2005, the association issued a request to the Romanian government asking that the Aromanians be recognized as a national minority with their own minority rights, including political representation.
- Picurarlu de la Pind ("The Shepherd of the Pindus") Aromanian Association of Dobruja
- Pindean Commune
- Andrei Șaguna Society of the Aromanians – Headquartered in Constanța.
- Aromanian Cultural Society – Headquartered in Bucharest.
- Aromanian Youth – Headquartered in Constanța. It is a student club.
- Pilisteri – Headquartered in Bucharest. Folklore group.
- Ensemble of Sarighiol de Deal – Headquartered in Sarighiol de Deal. Folklore group.
- Mușata Armână – Headquartered in Mihail Kogălniceanu. Folklore group.
- La Steaua – Headquartered in Mihail Kogălniceanu. Folklore group.

=== Serbia ===
- Lunjina Serbian–Aromanian Association – The only Aromanian association in Belgrade as of 2002. It had about 450 members at the time, mostly recent Aromanian migrants from North Macedonia to Serbia, with few originating from Serbia's centuries-old Aromanian urban population. The association publishes the Light. Bulletin of the Serbian–Aromanian Association.

=== Diaspora ===
Since the 18th century, Aromanians outside their homeland in the Balkans have played a key role in the struggle for the preservation of Aromanian culture, identity and language.

- Trâ Armânami Association of French Aromanians – Headquartered in Paris, France. It publishes a newsletter.
- Gramos Foundation – Headquartered in Princeton, United States. It was founded in 1913.
- Society Farsharotu – Headquartered in Trumbull, United States. It was founded in 1903 and publishes The Newsletter of the Society Farsharotu twice a year.
- Aromanians of Canada – Headquartered in Toronto, Canada. It was founded in 1974.
- Aromanian Foundation – Headquartered in the state of Victoria, Australia. It was founded in 1964.
- Union for Aromanian Language and Culture – Headquartered in Freiburg im Breisgau, Germany. It publishes Zborlu a nostru ("Our Word").
- Vlach Association of Australia
- Aromanian Society of Culture and Art – Headquartered in Sydney, Australia.
- Association of Vlachs – Headquartered in Menden, Germany. Formed by Aromanian migrant workers from Greece to Germany.
- Munich Pan-Hellenic Association of Vlachs – Headquartered in Munich, Germany. Formed by Aromanian migrant workers from Greece to Germany.

Czech anthropologist Markéta Zandlová defined the Trâ Armânami Association of French Aromanians, the Society Farsharotu and the Union for Aromanian Language and Culture as the only Aromanian cultural organizations in the diaspora that have gone beyond the local level in their activities.
