= Aromanian diaspora =

Any Aromanian population living outside its traditional homeland

Gheorghe Mocioni's palace in Budapest (Teréz Boulevard 2–4), Hungary. The coat of arms of the Mocioni family, which was of Aromanian origin, is visible at the top.

The Aromanian diaspora (Aromanian: Diaspora armãneascã) is any ethnically Aromanian population living outside its traditional homeland in the Balkans. The Aromanians are a small Balkan ethnic group living scattered throughout Albania, Bulgaria, Greece, North Macedonia, Romania and Serbia. Historically, they also used to live in other countries such as Bosnia and Herzegovina and Croatia, although they have ever since been assimilated.

Much of the Aromanian diaspora originates from the village of Moscopole. Formerly, Moscopole was an important city and one of the biggest in the Balkans, being rivaled only by Istanbul within the European Ottoman Empire. However, it was destroyed in 1788 by Ali Pasha of Ioannina. Many Aromanians were murdered or enslaved, and many left Moscopole and went to other parts of the Balkans, founding settlements such as Kruševo (Crushuva), but also leaving the region and going to places like Budapest (now in Hungary), Vienna (in Austria) or what is now Italy.

As a result of this, in the 19th century, Budapest and Vienna became gathering points for the Aromanian diaspora. These Aromanians began to publish texts in their native language and promoted the Aromanian language and culture. The Aromanian diaspora in these cities stands out for being one of the first Aromanian populations of which some of their members developed a strictly Aromanian identity. Some important Aromanian figures from Austria and Hungary of this epoch are Mihail G. Boiagi, Gheorghe Constantin Roja and Constantin Ucuta. The Aromanian diaspora here also came into contact with the also Romance-speaking Romanian national movement in Transylvania (which also was part of Austria or Austria-Hungary at the time), which may have impulsed them into their actions. The Sina family, originally from Moscopole, became for a time one of the richest and most economically powerful dynasties within imperial Austria, becoming the main rivals of the Rothschild family.

Additionally, before, despite being a mostly Aromanian cultural center, Moscopole was also notably Greek-speaking and was influenced by Greek culture. Because of this, many individuals usually considered part of the Greek diaspora in Austria and Hungary were in fact Hellenized ethnic Aromanians. Additionally, some Aromanians from these places opposed the Greek influence over the Aromanians, with Roja accusing the "new Greeks" that "how could they dare to separate my people and those at the other side of the Danube". He also considered the Romanians as "our own brothers".

Today, the Aromanian diaspora engages in important actions for the preservation of their culture. Those in for example Hungary are long assimilated, but some in Australia, Canada, France, Germany and the United States have founded Aromanians cultural organizations with the aim of promoting Aromanian culture, identity and language. Some examples are the Trâ Armânami Association of French Aromanians (France), the Union for Aromanian Language and Culture (Germany) and the Society Farsharotu (United States).

== See also ==
- Greek diaspora
- Romanian diaspora
