= Union for Aromanian Language and Culture =

Aromanian cultural organization in Germany

- Uniunea trã Limba shi Cultura Armãnã; Union für Aromunische Sprache und Kultur
- Formation: 1985; 40 years ago
- Founder: Vasile Barba
- Type: NGO
- Headquarters: Freiburg im Breisgau
- Location: Germany

The Union for Aromanian Language and Culture (Aromanian: Uniunea trã Limba shi Cultura Armãnã, ULCA; German: Union für Aromunische Sprache und Kultur, UASK) is an organization of Aromanians in Germany headquartered at Freiburg im Breisgau. It was founded in 1985 by the Aromanian professor Vasile Barba, who had migrated to West Germany from Romania two years earlier together with his wife Katharina Barba, an ethnic German of Romania.

The Union for Aromanian Language and Culture was the first Aromanian cultural organization to adopt a uniquely Aromanian identity and not a foreign one such as Greek or Romanian. It promotes the use of armîn as an ethnonym (name given to an ethnic group) to stress the separate identity of the Aromanians from the related Romanians. The ULCA has organized several international congresses on the Aromanians.

In 1984, the journal Zborlu a nostru ("Our Word") was founded by Barba, being published monthly; in 1985, it started being published quarterly and under the name of the ULCA. The journal is edited by the European Center of Aromanian Studies at the University of Freiburg. Since issues 1–2 from 2009, the editors of the journal have been the poet Kira Mantsu and the journalists Aurica Piha and Tașcu Lala, all of them Aromanians. Zborlu a nostru is the longest-running Aromanian publication since World War II, and it aims to cultivate the Aromanian language, the only language in which it is written, and promote literary works and translations in Aromanian. It also discusses cultural, philological, political and historical topics about the Aromanians in the Balkan countries they live in. Zborlu a nostru has published works from several recent Aromanian authors.

The Union for Aromanian Language and Culture managed to persuade the Parliamentary Assembly of the Council of Europe (PACE) into issuing Recommendation 1333 (1997) in June 1997 for the protection of Aromanian as a minority language among its members. Two years later, this recommendation was accepted by all members of the assembly, but according to the ULCA, it was only actually implemented in North Macedonia and Romania.

Due to his stance on the differentiation of the Aromanians from any other ethnicity, Barbu's ideas have been criticized by several researchers on the Aromanians. The ULCA was criticized by the pro-Romanian Aromanian literary critic and writer Hristu Cândroveanu, who believed all Aromanians are ethnic Romanians. The organization has also attempted several unsuccessful contacts with the Aromanians in Greece and has sometimes alienated them, having at one point referred to the Greek Eastern Orthodox Ecumenical Patriarchate of Constantinople as a "wolf". Furthermore, the Panhellenic Federation of Cultural Associations of Vlachs strongly rejected Recommendation 1333 (1997) and the status of the Aromanians as an ethnic minority in Greece, stating that they instead are ethnic Greeks.

== See also ==
- Aromanian diaspora
- List of Aromanian cultural organizations
