= List of Aromanians =

This is a list in progress of world-famous or important Aromanians and people having Aromanian ancestry.

== Arts ==
- Zicu Araia (1877–1948), Aromanian poet, schoolteacher and separatist, born in Samarina
- Constantin Belimace (1848–1932), Romanian poet, born in Malovište
- Leon Boga (1886–1974), Aromanian writer, schoolteacher and archivist in Romania, born in Veles
- Hristu Cândroveanu (1928–2013), Romanian writer, Aromanian ancestry
- George Ceara (1880/1881–1939), Aromanian poet and prose writer, born in Xirolivado
- Jovan Četirević Grabovan (1720–1790), Serbian Orthodox icon painter
- Ion Foti (1887–1946) Romanian writer, born in Kleisoura
- Jovan Jovanović Zmaj (1833–1904), Serbian poet, distant paternal Aromanian ancestry.
- Prokop Mima (1920–1986), Albanian actor
- Stere Gulea (1943–), Romanian filmmaker, Greek-Aromanian parentage
- Yanaki and Milton Manaki (1878–1954; 1882–1964), photography and cinema pioneers, born in Avdella
- Branislav Nušić (1864–1938), Serbian novelist and playwright, Greek-Aromanian father
- Janaq Paço (1914–1991), Albanian sculptor
- Jovan Sterija Popović, Serbian writer, father of Greek-Aromanian descent
- Constantin Noica (1909–1987), Romanian philosopher, essayist and poet
- Dumitru Pasima (1935–2022), Romanian sculptor
- Nuși Tulliu (1872–1941), Romanian poet and novelist, born in Avdella
- Camil Ressu (1880–1962), Romanian painter
- Florica Prevenda, Romanian painter
- Alexandru Arșinel, Romanian actor and comedian*
- Toma Caragiu (1925–1977), Romanian actor, born in Argos Orestiko
- Dimitris Mitropanos (1948–2012), Greek singer
- Takis Mousafiris (1936–2021), Greek composer, lyricist and songwriter
- Albert Vërria (1936–2015), Albanian actor
- Margarita Xhepa (1932–2025), Albanian actress
- Ndriçim Xhepa (1957–), Albanian actor
- Toma Enache (1970–), Romanian film director
- Tașcu Gheorghiu (1910–1981), Romanian writer and visual artist
- Taško Načić (1934–1993), Serbian actor, paternal Aromanian descent
- Dan Pița, Romanian filmmaker
- Sandër Prosi (1920–1985), Albanian actor
- Sergiu Nicolaescu (1930–2013), Romanian filmmaker and politician, Aromanian family
- Parashqevi Simaku (1966–), Albanian singer
- Apostolos Kaldaras (1922–1990), Greek composer
- Elena Gheorghe, Romanian singer, Aromanian father
- Kaliopi (1966–), Macedonian singer of mixed Aromanian–Macedonian background
- Toše Proeski, Macedonian pop singer-songwriter, family from Kruševo
- Ștefan Octavian Iosif, Romanian author
- Eli Fara (1967–), Albanian singer, Greek-Aromanian ancestry
- Dimitrie Osmanli (1927–2006), Yugoslav and Macedonian film, television and theater director
- Nicolae Velo (1882–1924), Aromanian poet and diplomat in Romania, born in Malovište
- Jakov Xoxa (1923–1979), Albanian author and writer
- Nikolla Zoraqi (1928–1991), Albanian composer
- Miladinov brothers (1810/1830–1862), Bulgarian poets and folklorists of partial Aromanian ancestry
- Vassilis Tsitsanis (1915–1984), Greek songwriter
- Kostas Virvos (1926–2015), Greek composer
- Rayko Zhinzifov (1839–1877), Bulgarian poet of Aromanian ancestry

== Law, philanthropy and commerce ==
- Evangelos Zappas (1800–1865), philanthropist and businessman
- Konstantinos Zappas (1814–1892), entrepreneur and benefactor
- George Averoff (1818–1899), Greek businessman and philanthropist, born in Metsovo.
- Sotirios Voulgaris (Aromanian mother) (1857–1932), businessman
- Paolo Bulgari (partially Aromanian) (1937–), businessman and jewelry designer
- Georgios Sinas (1783–1856), Habsburg-Greek entrepreneur, banker and philanthropist, born in Moscopole.
- Michael Tositsas (1787–1856), Aromanian benefactor
- Simon Sinas (1810–1876), Austrian-Greek banker, aristocrat, benefactor and diplomat
- Emanoil Gojdu (1802–1870), Austrian-Romanian lawyer and philanthropist. Moscopole family.
- Mocioni family (19th c.), banking and philanthropist family in Austria-Hungary
- Petar Ičko (c. 1755–1808), Ottoman merchant, Serbian diplomat, born in Pyrgoi, possibly Aromanian.
- Sterjo Nakov (1948–), North Macedonian businessman
- Lazaros Tsamis (1878–1933), Aromanian merchant

== Clergy ==
- Dionysios Mantoukas (1648–1751), bishop
- Archimandrite Averchie (1806/1818–?), monk and schoolteacher
- Joachim III of Constantinople (1834–1912), Patriarch (1878–1884, 1901–1912), family from Kruševo
- Meletie Covaci (1707–1775), Catholic bishop
- Constantin Ucuta
- Theodore Kavalliotis (1718–1789), Greek Orthodox priest, teacher and Englightener.
- Andrei Șaguna (1809–1873), Romanian Orthodox bishop and Romanian nationalist, family from Grabovë
- Nektarios Terpos (end 17th–18th century), priest and author
- Ioakeim Martianos (1875–1955), bishop and author
- Damian of Albania, Albanian Orthodox Archbishop from 1966-1967
- Haralambie Balamaci (1850–1914), Aromanian priest
- Hierotheus I of Alexandria (?–1845), Greek Orthodox Patriarch of Alexandria
- Cyril of Bulgaria (1901–1971), first Patriarch of the restored Bulgarian Patriarchate

== Politics ==
- Helena Angelina Komnene (fl. 1271–91), Byzantine princess, Aromanian mother
- Rigas Feraios (1757–1798), writer, political thinker and revolutionary
- Evangelos Averoff, Greek minister and leader of the New Democracy party
- Alexandros Papagos (1883–1955), Hellenic Army officer and Prime Minister, Aromanian mother
- Florica Bagdasar, first woman minister in Romania and neuropsychiatrist
- Nicolae Constantin Batzaria (1874–1952), Aromanian cultural activist, Ottoman statesman and Romanian writer.
- Apostol Arsache, Greek-Romanian politician and philanthropist
- Costică Canacheu, Romanian politician, deputy in the Romanian Parliament, secretary of the Democratic Party
- Ion Caramitru, Romanian politician, former Minister of Culture
- Vladan Đorđević (1844–1930), Serbian politician, diplomat, physician, prolific writer, and organizer of the State Sanitary Service
- Dhimitër Tutulani (1857–1937), Albanian lawyer and politician
- Margarita Tutulani (1925–1943) anti-fascist
- Alcibiades Diamandi, Greek politician, separatist and fascist collaborator
- Vassilis Rapotikas (1888–1943) - commander of the Roman Legion
- Andreas Tzimas, (1909–1972) - communist politician
- Spyridon Lambros, (1851–1919) - Greek politician and history professor, Aromanian father
- Llazar Fundo (1899–1944) - Albanian communist, former member of the Balkan communist federation, purged in 1944.
- Michael Dukakis, American Governor of Massachusetts and former presidential candidate. Greek-Aromanian mother.
- Liri Gero (1926–1944) - Albanian World War II martyr and heroine.
- Taki Fiti (born 1950), Macedonian economist and former state financial minister
- Ioannis Kolettis, Greek Prime Minister, declared independence from the Ottoman Empire
- Teodor Heba (1914–2001) - Albanian chairman of the Politburo from 1950 to 1951.
- Dimitrios Makris (1910–1981), politician and minister
- Apostol Mărgărit, leader of the pro-Romanian faction of the Aromanians of Greece, inspector of the Romanian schools and member of the Romanian Academy in Bucharest
- Nicolaos Matussis, politician and lawyer, leader of the collaborationist Roman Legion
- Filip Mișea (1873–1944), Aromanian activist, physician and politician
- Rita Marko, Albanian communist politician.
- Alexandros Svolos, jurist and president of the Political Committee of National Liberation (unofficial Prime Minister)
- Athanas Shundi (1892–1940) - Albanian politician, pharmacist, and early supporter of the Albanian Orthodox Church
- Yannis Boutaris (1942-1924) - businessman, politician and mayor of Thessaloniki
- Nako Spiru (1918–1947) - Albanian communist politician
- Petros Zappas, member of the Greek Parliament
- Victor Ponta (born 1972), Romanian politician and jurist, partially Aromanian
- Hari Kostov (born 1959), Macedonian politician
- Toma Fila (born 1941), Serbian politician and lawyer
- Lazar Koliševski (1914–2000), Yugoslav Macedonian politician of maternal Aromanian descent

== Sciences, academia and engineering ==
- Aurel Plasari - Albanian intellectual
- Aristotelis Valaoritis, poet and politician
- Dimitri Atanasescu, Ottoman-born Aromanian who founded the first Romanian school in the Balkans in Trnovo in 1864
- Mihail G. Boiagi, Austrian-born Aromanian grammarian and professor
- Marcu Beza, Romanian poet, writer, essayist, literary critique, publicist, folklorist, and diplomat
- Elie Carafoli, Romanian-educated, born in Greece, aerodynamics innovator, university teacher
- Ioannis Chalkeus, Aromanian scholar, philosopher and figure of the modern Greek Enlightenment
- Mihail Dimonie, Aromanian botanist and teacher
- Nicolae Ianovici, Aromanian linguist
- Mitrush Kuteli - Albanian writer, literary critic and translator
- Theodor Capidan - Ottoman-born Romanian linguist
- Jovan Karamata (1902–1967), Serbian mathematician, paternal Greek-Aromanian descent
- Mina Minovici, Romanian forensic scientist; director of the first Romanian Institute of Legal Medicine
- Ioan Nicolidi of Pindus (1737–1828), Aromanian physician and noble in Austria
- Sterie Diamandi, Romanian biographer and essayist
- Neagu Djuvara, Romanian diplomat and historian
- Stoica Lascu, Romanian historian, immigrant Aromanian parentage
- Markides Pouliou brothers, Aromanian typographers in Austria
- George Murnu, Romanian historian
- Daniel Moscopolites, Aromanian philologist, author of a famous lexicon
- Cezar Papacostea, Romanian literary scholar, born in Ottoman Macedonia
- Dušan J. Popović, Serbian historian
- Gheorghe Constantin Roja, Aromanian doctor, philologist and historian
- Nicolae Saramandu, Romanian linguist and philologist
- Nicolae Șerban Tanașoca, Romanian historian and philologist
- Constantin Ucuta, Aromanian academic and protopope in Prussia
- Pericle Papahagi, Aromanian literary historian and folklorist
- Matilda Caragiu Marioțeanu, Aromanian academic, member of the Romanian Academy
- Ștefan Mihăileanu (1859–1900), professor and journalist
- Ilo Mitkë Qafëzezi - Albanian intellectual, Aromanian–Albanian background
- Sotiris Bletsas - Greek architect and Aromanian language activist
- Nicolas Trifon (1949–2023), Romanian-French academic, editor and linguist (partially Aromanian)
- Tache Papahagi (1892–1977), folklorist and linguist
- Haralampije Polenaković (1909–1984), Yugoslav and Macedonian literary historian and lexicographer
- Ioan D. Caragiani (1841–1921), folklorist and translator
- Kostas Krystallis (1868–1894), author and poet
- Naum Torbov (1880–1952), architect

== Sports ==
- Gigi Becali, politician; owner of the Steaua București football club
- Adrian Mutu
- Cristian Gațu, Romanian handball player
- Gabriel Torje
- Gheorghe Hagi, Romanian football player
- Adrian Pitu, Romanian football player
- Ianis Hagi, Romanian football player
- Simona Halep, Romanian tennis player
- Dominique Moceanu, Romanian-American gymnast
- Jennifer Bricker American acrobat and aerialist

== Military ==
- János Damjanich (1804–1849), general during the Hungarian Revolution of 1848 and a national hero of Hungary
- Traian Doda (1822–1895), Austro-Hungarian general and political leader of the Banat Romanians
- Rigas Feraios (1757–1798), pioneer of the Greek War of Independence
- Giorgakis Olympios (1772–1821), armatole and military commander
- Anastasios Manakis (1790–1864), Greek revolutionary of the Greek War of Independence
- Georgios Modis (1887–1975), jurist, politician, writer and Macedonian Struggle fighter
- Anastasios Pichion (1836–1913), educator and revolutionary
- Konstantinos Smolenskis (1843–1915), Hellenic Army officer
- Cincar-Marko (1777–1822), one of the leaders of th First Serbian Uprising, aristocrat and diplomat
- Cincar-Janko (1779–1833), one of the most prominent Serbian leaders of the First Serbian Uprising
- Pitu Guli (1865–1903), Internal Macedonian Revolutionary Organization commander, born in Kruševo.
- Mitre the Vlach (1873–1907), IMRO commander, born in Makrochori.
- Ioryi Mucitano (1882–1911), Aromanian IMRO armatole revolutionary
- Cola Nicea (1886–?), Aromanian IMRO armatole revolutionary
- Stefanos Sarafis (1890–1957), Military officer, Colonel and Major General
- Christodoulos Hatzipetros (1799–1869), Greek military leader during the Greek War of Independence, general and adjutant to King Otto of Greece after Independence
- Vasil Trasha (1928–1958), Albanian partisan and pilot
