= Aromanian literature =

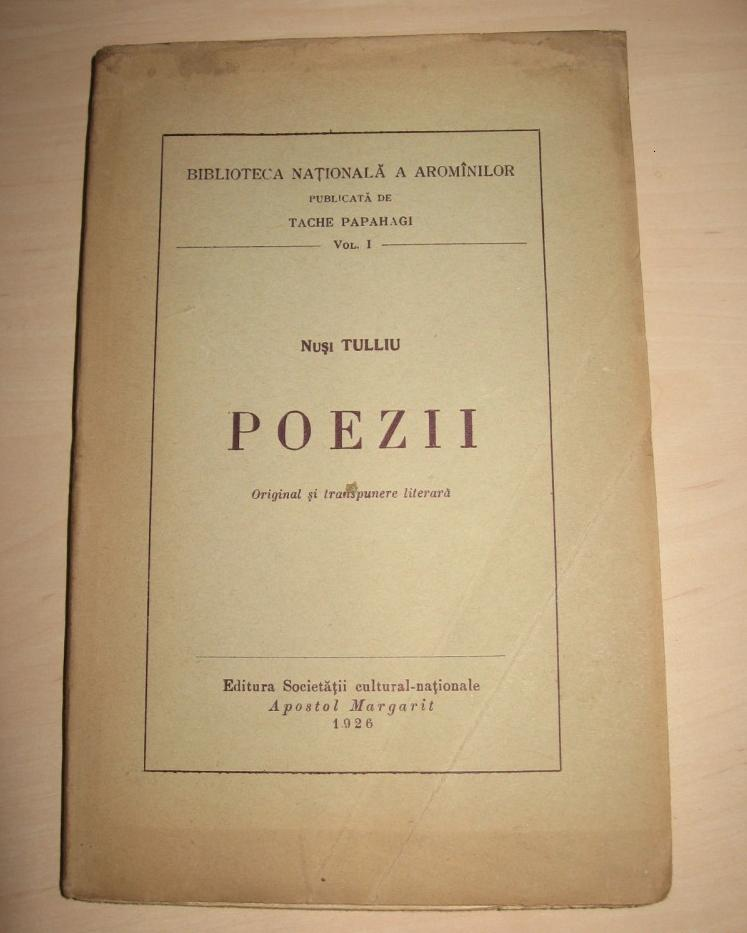
Cover of Poezii ("Poems"), a collection of poems by the Aromanian poet Nuși Tulliu, published in 1926

Aromanian literature (Aromanian: Literatura armãneascã or rrãmãneascã) is literature written in the Aromanian language. The first authors to write in Aromanian appeared during the second half of the 18th century in the metropolis of Moscopole (Theodore Kavalliotis, Daniel Moscopolites and Constantin Ucuta), with a true cultured literature in Aromanian being born in the 19th and early 20th centuries. Notable authors include Constantin Belimace, author of the well-known anthem of the Aromanians Dimãndarea pãrinteascã ("The Will of the Forefathers"); Nuși Tulliu, whose novel Mirmintsã fãrã crutsi ("Graves Without Crosses") was the first in Aromanian; and Leon Boga, whose 150-sonnets epic poem Voshopolea ("Moscopole") founded the Aromanian literary trend of the utopian Moscopole. In theatre, Toma Enache has excelled.

== History ==
In the 18th century, the first authors who wrote and published their works in the Aromanian language appeared in Moscopole, an important Aromanian-inhabited commercial and industrial center during the 18th-century Ottoman Empire. These authors were Theodore Kavalliotis, Daniel Moscopolites and Constantin Ucuta, followed in the beginning of the 19th century by Gheorghe Constantin Roja and Mihail G. Boiagi. Also dated at around this period are the anonymous manuscripts of the Aromanian Missal and the Codex Dimonie. Some authors, including the Romanian Aromanian historian Stoica Lascu, have referred to this period in the second half of the 18th century as the "first Aromanian renaissance", which would have taken place due to the influence of the ideas of the Age of Enlightenment and the assumption of an ethnic and linguistic identity other than the Greek one by these early authors.

The verses of the inscription of the Simota Vase represent the first known poem in Aromanian, being dated to the 18th century. According to the Romanian Aromanian professor Gheorghe Carageani, a true and cultured Aromanian literature was born in the late 19th and early 20th centuries, with the first Aromanian poet being Mihail Nicolescu from Magarevo (Magaruva or Mãgãreva). He was followed by other poets, including Zicu Araia, Nicolae Constantin Batzaria, Constantin Belimace, Marcu Beza, George Ceara, Constantin I. Cosmescu, George Murnu, Nuși Tulliu and Nicolae Velo. All of these were students at Romanian schools in the Balkans, with their works showing some influence from the Romanian language. The best-known poem in Aromanian is Belimace's 1888 Dimãndarea pãrinteascã ("The Will of the Forefathers"), which is today considered an anthem for the Aromanians. Tulliu's novel Mirmintsã fãrã crutsi ("Graves Without Crosses") was the first Aromanian-language novel.

In 1922, the Romanian Aromanian folklorist and linguist Tache Papahagi published his Antologie aromânească ("Aromanian Anthology"), an anthology featuring a selection of Aromanian folk literary texts (proverbs, riddles, lyrical poems, ballads, legends, stories, traditions and fairy tales), cultured literature (extracts from works by Araia, Batzaria, Belimace, Beza, Leon Boga, Tache Caciona, Ceara, Ion Foti, Murnu, Tulliu, Velo and others), folk music and a glossary.

The aforementioned Moscopole was largely devastated and destroyed in the second half of the 18th century. Aromanian nationalists developed an utopian dream surrounding Moscopole, and the former metropolis came to be regarded as a "golden age" in the history of the Aromanians. With the birth of Aromanian literature, many Aromanian writers, predominantly young Aromanians educated in Romanian schools, began to write articles, poems and stories in Aromanian publications about an utopic Moscopole. Feelings and elements such as love, nostalgia, superstitions, mentalities, emotions and everyday aspects of life were predominant in these writings, with depression and nostalgia for the city being the protagonists in this literary phenomenon. The founder of this literary trend was Boga with his epic poem of 150 sonnets Voshopolea ("Moscopole"), with other Aromanian writers who wrote on Moscopole including Batzaria, Nicolae Caratană, Foti, Kira Mantsu and Velo.

Regarding theatre, since his graduation from the Faculty of Theatre of the Caragiale National University of Theatre and Film in 1997, the Romanian Aromanian film director and actor Toma Enache has made several theatrical performances in Romania and other countries in Aromanian, having also translated theatrical plays into the language. He has also written poetry and translated poems into Aromanian.

== See also ==
- Romanian literature
