= Tache Papahagi =

Aromanian folklorist and linguist

Tache Papahagi (October 20, 1892 – January 17, 1977; Aromanian: Tachi Papahagi) was an Aromanian folklorist and linguist.

He was born into an Aromanian family in Avdella (Avdhela), a village that formed part of the Ottoman Empire's Manastir Vilayet and is now in Greece. He attended primary school in his native village, followed from 1902 to 1912 by studies at the Romanian high schools in Ioannina and Bitola. From 1912 to 1916, he went to the literature and philosophy faculty of the University of Bucharest in Romania. In 1925, he obtained a doctorate in philology from the same institution; his thesis dealt with the Maramureș dialect and folklore. He was a high school teacher at Târgu Neamț from 1916 to 1918. Papahagi was then hired at his alma mater, where he rose from teaching assistant (1920–1925) to docent (1926–1928), associate professor (1928–1943) and full professor (1943–1948).

His first book was a printed conference report, the 1915 Aromânii din punct de vedere istoric, cultural și politic. In 1927, he started a course on Romanian linguistic ethnography, the first of its kind. His contributions appeared in Grai și suflet, Langue et littérature and Vieața nouă. His research was consistently interdisciplinary, combining ethnography, folklore and dialectology, and analyzing phenomena from comparatist, Romance and Balkan perspectives.

A good part of his work dealt with the literary, folk and religious corpus in the Aromanian language, and was aimed at making it known and emphasizing its value. An early work in this direction was Antologie aromânească ("Aromanian Anthology"; 1922), which features a selection of folk literary texts (proverbs, riddles, lyrical poems, ballads, legends, stories, traditions and fairy tales), cultured literature (extracts from works by Zicu Araia, Nicolae Constantin Batzaria, Constantin Belimace, Marcu Beza, Leon Boga, Tache Caciona, George Ceara, Ion Foti, George Murnu, Nuși Tulliu, Nicolae Velo and others), Aromanian folk music and a glossary.

His studies of ethnography and folklore (among them Images d'ethnographie roumaine, vol. I-III, 1928-1934; Macedoromânii sau aromânii, 1927; Aromânii. Grai, folclor, etnografie, 1932; Poezia lirică populară, 1948, Mic dicționar folcloric, 1979), as well as of linguistics (Din morfologia limbei române, 1937; Manual de fonetică romanică, 1943; Dicționarul dialectului aromân general și etimologic, 1963), are the result of careful fieldwork and show a vast erudition not only in his specialty, but also in related fields. Papahagi held numerous university courses on linguistics, ethnography and folklore, many of which were printed. In 1964, the year he became an emeritus professor, he was granted the State Prize.

== See also ==
- Pericle Papahagi
