= Zicu Araia =

Aromanian poet, schoolteacher and separatist

- Born: Zicu A. Araia; 1 July 1877; Samarina, Manastir vilayet, Ottoman Empire (now Greece)
- Died: 1948 (aged 70–71); Samarina, Greece
- Education: Romanian High School of Bitola
- Occupations: Poet, schoolteacher, politician
- Writing career
- Genres: Poetry
- Subjects: Aromanian pastoral life, folklore, ethnography, landscapes, politics and history

Zicu A. Araia (1 July 1877 – 1948; Greek: Ζήκος Αράιας, Zíkos Aráias) was an Aromanian poet, schoolteacher and separatist leader. Born in Samarina in the Pindus mountains, Araia was an exception among the Aromanian writers who emigrated from their homeland, returning to the Pindus after two years in Romania and living there until his death. Araia was teacher at Romanian schools in the region for decades, he himself had been educated in such schools.

Araia's poetic production, although small in number, stands among the most important contributions to Aromanian literature. His poems focus on pastoral, folkloric and ethnographic aspects of the Aromanians, such as the lives of Aromanian shepherds or landscapes familiar to the Aromanians. Araia also played an important role in the two Aromanian separatist projects that took place in Greece in the 20th century: that of World War I, the self-declared canton in Samarina; and that of World War II, the Principality of the Pindus, with Araia having been an important partner and collaborator for prominent separatist Alcibiades Diamandi and the Italian occupation authorities.

== Biography ==
=== Education, profession and personal life ===
Zicu A. Araia was born in Samarina, an Aromanian village then in the Ottoman Empire and now in Greece, on 1 July 1877. Samarina is located in the Pindus mountains, in an area with the highest concentration of Aromanian people anywhere. Araia studied at a Romanian primary school in his birthplace, later graduating from the Romanian gymnasium in Ioannina in 1894 and then from the Romanian High School of Bitola in 1897. In 1898, Araia entered the Faculty of Letters of the University of Bucharest in Romania, but due to financial problems, he had to abandon it and entered the School of Agriculture of Herăstrău on a scholarship. However, the career did not come to terms with his poetic vocations and he abandoned it as well, returning to the Pindus in 1900.

Apart from the two years he lived in Bucharest, Araia lived his entire life in his native region of the Pindus. Romanian Aromanian editor, literary critic and writer Hristu Cândroveanu described Araia as the only Aromanian writer who emigrated from his homeland and eventually returned, staying in the Pindus until the end of his life. Upon returning, Araia was appointed schoolteacher. He first taught at the Romanian school in Metsovo and then at that in Praitori. Araia would then teach at the Romanian school of Samarina–Vlachogianni (functioning in Samarina during the summer and in Vlachogianni during the winter), of which he became the head teacher; as of 1922, he had held this post for 17 years. Araia also taught at the Romanian high school in Grevena before retiring. One of his former students from that high school would later say about him: "He taught us to be loved, esteemed, to listen. He only taught us such things, good deeds."

Araia was the father of Sotirios Z. Araias, who was a teacher at the Romanian high school in Grevena as well. Araia was retired as of 1942, and as of January 1944, he was a pensioner of the Romanian state. He died in Samarina in 1948.

=== Literary work ===
Araia was a greatly relevant figure for Aromanian poetry. Romanian Aromanian professor Gheorghe Carageani included Araia among the authors he called "classics" of Aromanian literature, Romanian Aromanian historian Stoica Lascu called him "one of the most talented poets of the Aromanians" and Romanian Aromanian linguist Matilda Caragiu Marioțeanu described him as "the poet most connected to the local Aromanian reality", also describing the language of his poems as "pure, unaltered".

Araia's work is not very numerous, he wrote 22 original poems and four translations, but they are among the most expressive works in Aromanian literature. His poems often make direct reference to the Pindus mountains, such being the case of Toamnă'n Pind ("Autumn in the Pindus"), Armânescul sândză strigă ("The Aromanian Blood Screams"), Samarina, Ianula Șamaniclu and Mailu și Pindul ("May and the Pindus"). According to Cândroveanu, Araia knew the Pindus "like his own yard", having traveled through the mountains and the Aromanian settlements in them throughout his entire life. As for his translations, Araia translated into Aromanian three poems by the Romanian poet George Coșbuc, Nunta Zamfirei ("The Wedding of Zamfira"), Moartea lui Fulger ("The Death of Fulger") and El Zorab ("The Horse", in Arabic), as well as Enoch Arden by the English poet Alfred, Lord Tennyson. Araia published his works in the Aromanian magazines of his time, both those in Romania and in the Aromanian homeland, including Almanahul aromânesc, Flambura, Lilicea Pindului and Lumina.

The Ottoman-born Aromanian journalist, translator and writer Ion Foti described Toamnă'n Pind as one of the best Aromanian-language poems written up until that moment, with Araia deserving a "place of honor" in Aromanian literature according to him. Published in the last issue of Lumina of the year 1907, the poem emulates the metre used by Coșbuc, having a lively verse in which "the images develop one after another without difficulty". Foti said that "not a single word seems to be superfluous" in the poem. After analysing it, Foti advised Araia to avoid using local words and to first concentrate better and then write. Ianula Șamaniclu is a poem published in 1911 about an armatole revolutionary from Perivoli with that name who had died a year before. Calea ("Transhumance") is dedicated to another Aromanian militant, Mihali Teguiani. From Vovousa, Teguiani had fought Greek andartes bands in the Ottoman Empire and had been sentenced as a result to the death penalty by the Ottoman authorities, although he was later amnestied. Calea was one of Araia's poems appreciated the most by the Ottoman-born Aromanian folklorist and linguist Tache Papahagi, whom Lascu defined as "exigent". Cândroveanu suggested that Calea might have been written under the influence of the Romanian poet and politician with Aromanian origins Dimitrie Bolintineanu, although "with much more sense of the real" than him. Mailu și Pindul is a poem with 21 stanzas, the last two of which give an insight, according to Lascu, on Araia's sentiments of identification with Romania:

Aromanian original

Ma, di cînd văpsita-ñi miră
Ñi-scrise-a ñia-n treile seri
S-bănedzu sclav, tu lăi ghideri,
Ñi-asburară... Ș-tuț fudziră,
La Carpaț a mei xifteri!"

"O, ca vai, lai Pind, di bană-ți!
Nu-ț undzeaște-ahtare hal'.
Aghiu-Ghiorghi di pri-albul cal
Țî oru ca s-vearsă pri-arană-ț
Balsam dulțe ca-n Ardeal!"

Translation:
English translation (Note: Based in Kira Mantsu's Romanian translation of the poem in Cândroveanu 1985, pp. 188–191.)

But since it [the month of May] foretold me
Black luck only sighed,
To be a slave and in pain,
My falcons have dispersed
To the Carpathians they have all flown!"

"Pindus, don't let yourself
Contained by the wave of pain!
Your sons, now far away,
Over your wound they will put
Sweet balm from Transylvania!"

Cândroveanu highlighted pastoral and folkloric elements, such as the observation of Aromanian shepherds, in several of Araia's poems, including Toamnă'n Pind, Calea and Nă cunache-al Hagigogă ("With the Shepherds on the Way"). Cândroveanu also noted in the aforementioned poems, as well as in Mailu și Pindul and Fudzi haraua di la noi ("Well-Being Leaves From Us"), a great specificity, with Araia featuring in his poems landscapes recognizable to the Aromanians or "peak" moments in the lives of Aromanian shepherds; Cândroveanu described these as images of great concreteness, as if they were palpable, and written with great ethnographic detail, which would be proof that Araia was a good connoisseur of the world he wrote about.

Araia's poems were translated into Romanian and published by Papahagi in a 1932 collection titled Poeții Z. A. Araia și T. Caciona together with the poetry and prose of the Ottoman-born Aromanian writer Tache Caciona. They were also published by Editura Cartea Aromână with the title Fudzi harauùa di la noi, edited by the Macedonian Aromanian publicist, translator and writer Dina Cuvata and the United States-based Aromanian writer Tiberius Cunia.

=== Role as a separatist leader ===
==== In World War I ====
In July 1917, as World War I was taking place, Italian troops occupied part of Greece's Pindus mountains area. Forces of the Entente, of which Italy was a member, were already present in northern Greece since October 1915 to support allied Serbia. They had been allowed in by one of the two rival political factions in Greece existing at the time during the so-called National Schism; led by Prime Minister Eleftherios Venizelos, this faction strived for Greece's intervention in the war on the side of the Entente to fulfill the Greek irredentist territorial ambitions of the Megali Idea.

In this context, Araia would be among the Aromanian figures in the Italian-occupied villages in the Pindus that started campaigning for the establishment of an Aromanian republic in the area. Such a thing was determined by a 27 July congress convened in Samarina by these figures. Araia was one of the 23 members of a "council of delegates" of the Aromanians formed on 30 July following an assembly in Avdella. On 29 August, these figures declared in Samarina an independent Aromanian canton under Italian protection. Araia is recorded as having been "minister of schools" and "minister of culture" of this self-proclaimed canton. A provisional directing committee seated in Samarina was subsequently established which requested support from Romania as well. Composed of seven people, the committee included Araia, the aforementioned Teguiani and prominent Aromanian separatist Alcibiades Diamandi. On 30 and 31 August respectively, the Romanian and Italian consulates in Ioannina declared their disapproval of the separatists' actions and disassociated themselves from them.

As the Italian forces had already withdrawn from the area at the moment of the proclamation of the Aromanian canton, Greek forces progressively restored control over the Aromanian settlements, culminating on 7 September in the recapture of Samarina among other villages. This occurred without any resistance from the Aromanian separatists, such an idea had already been discouraged by Romanian state authorities present in the Pindus. However, mistreatment of Aromanians by Greek forces was reported in Vovousa and Fourka. On 8 September, a Hellenic Armed Forces lieutenant arrested six Aromanian figures in Samarina, including Araia. According to a report by the Romanian consul in Ioannina, Dimitrie A. Mincu, they were accused of "having taken part in the proclamation of the autonomy of the Pindus" and of "having spread inaccurate alarming news to the authorities".

==== In World War II ====
On 28 October 1940, during World War II, Italy invaded Greece from its Albanian protectorate. Italy's leader Benito Mussolini wanted to demonstrate his German ally Adolf Hitler that Italy was also capable of obtaining great military victories, believing that Greece would be an easy target for this purpose. From the very day the war started, the Greek authorities began to lock up certain Aromanian figures, such as teachers, students and priests of Romanian schools and churches in Greece. Araia was sent to an internment camp in Corinth, this being "due to his propagandistic activities and his anti-Hellenic opinions" according to the Greek military officer and politician Athanasios Chrysochoou. At the time, Araia's son Sotirios was in the front line against Italy.

As Mussolini's assumptions proved to be wrong and Italian forces were pushed back from Greece and even southern Albania, Germany came to its ally's assistance and invaded Greece on 6 April 1941, quickly taking over the country. By early June, Greece was under a tripartite occupation by Axis members Germany, Italy and Bulgaria. The aforenamed Diamandi, who had left Greece after the end of World War I, returned to the Pindus in early July once the Italian occupation of the area following the German invasion had been established. He then assumed the role of "governor" of the area with Italian consent, exercising his own authority as the "representative" of the Aromanian people and rejecting that of the newly established Greek collaborator regime. Diamandi envisioned the establishment of an autonomous or independent Aromanian state under Italian tutelage encompassing the territories around the Pindus mountains. He called it the "Principality of the Pindus", of which he was to be the ruler. Araia was released following the occupation of Greece and became one of Diamandi's most important partners.

Araia is recorded as having been once again "minister of culture" of the Aromanian separatist entity. Furthermore, with Italian support and against the will of the Greek collaborator authorities, he became vice president of the community of Grevena. Araia was mentioned as the representative of the Bulgarian Aromanians in Diamandi's well-known 1 March 1942 manifesto, published on 2 April by the local press. He was later mentioned as the representative of the Serbian Aromanians instead in a 28 March publication by Diamandi in the Greek newspaper Thessaly. Reportedly, while receiving this title, Araia said, amused, that he had never been to Serbia and had no ties to the country.

Araia's son Sotirios also played a relevant role during this episode of the occupation of Greece. Sotirios offered his collaboration to the Italian authorities as soon as their occupation started. An 18 March 1942 report by the command of the Italian 24th Infantry Division "Pinerolo" said about him that "for his moral qualities and his balanced character he is esteemed even by the Greeks". A schoolteacher, Sotirios organized and led the separatists' youth during the occupation. He also spoke Italian and was an interpreter for the Italian authorities. According to Chrysochoou, many pro-Greek Aromanians were arrested by the Italians on his own personal initiative.

Faced with continuous advances by the Greek resistance forces of the National Liberation Front (EAM) in the areas of Grevena and Siatista, the Italian forces abandoned Grevena on 23 March 1943. It was decided that several Aromanian collaborators with Italy and pro-Romanian Aromanian figures would be evacuated for their safety, and they were taken to Thessaloniki. Initially, the Italian forces intended to burn Grevena before withdrawing to deprive the Greek resistance of the town's facilities and resources and to take revenge on the local population. However, they gave up on this idea following strong opposition by Aromanian separatists and pro-Romanian Aromanians, with Araia's intervention having been instrumental in this. The Aromanian figures evacuated to Thessaloniki initially settled in houses that had belonged to the Jewish population of the city, which had been recently deported. Upon arriving in Thessaloniki, Araia received a telegram with a letter of gratitude from the inhabitants of Grevena for his efforts to prevent the burning of the town.
