= Yioryi =

Yioryi, Ioryi or Yoryi is an Aromanian given name meaning George. Notable people with this name include:

- George Ceara (1880/1881–1939), Aromanian poet and prose writer; Ioryi Ceara in Aromanian
- Ioryi Mucitano (1882–1911), Aromanian revolutionary
- George Murnu (1868–1957), Aromanian university professor, archaeologist, historian, translator and poet in Romania; Ioryi Murnu in Aromanian

== See also ==
- George (given name)
- Georgios
- Gheorghe
- Giorgos
- Jorge Octavio Morel Tavárez, known as Yoryi Morel (1906–1979), Dominican painter, musician and teacher
