= Romanian High School of Bitola =

Romanian high school for Aromanians in Ottoman Bitola

- Liceul român/românesc din Bitolia
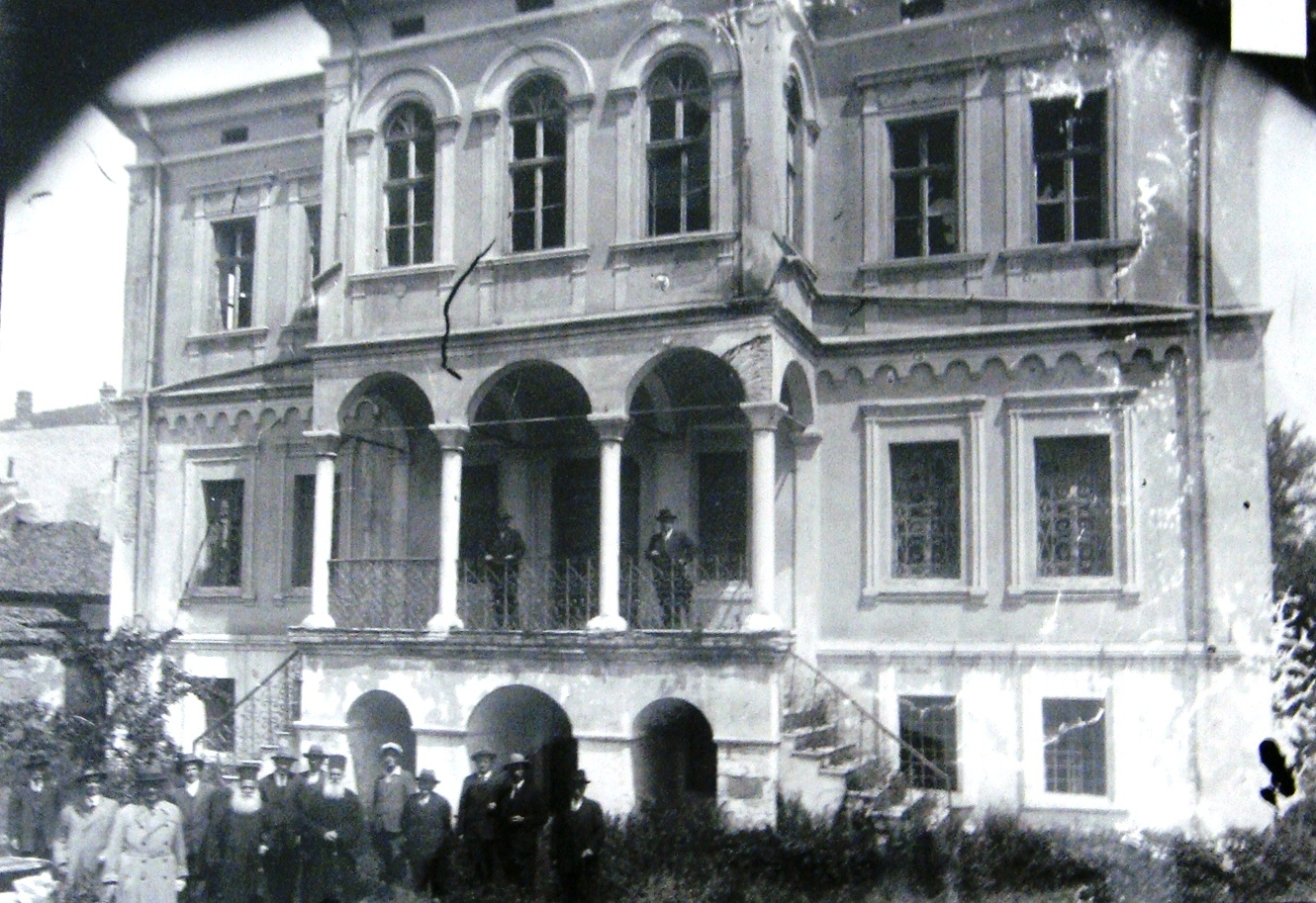
- The building of the Romanian High School of Bitola
- Bitola, Ottoman Empire (now North Macedonia; 1880–1912); Grevena, Greece (1924–1943); Thessaloniki, Greece (1943–1945)

Information
- Other name: Romanian High School of Grevena (Liceul român or românesc din Grebena)
- Type: Secondary school (lyceum, 1880–1912 and 1932–1945; gymnasium, 1924–1932)
- Established: June 1880 (Bitola); 1924 (Grevena)
- Closed: 23 October 1912 (Bitola); 1945 (Grevena)
- Teaching staff: 14 (late 1897); 9 (1935)
- Grades: 1–7 (Bitola); 1–5 (Grevena)
- Gender: Boys (Bitola); Mixed (Grevena)
- Enrollment: 154 (as of school year 1898/1899); 149 (1943/1944)
- Publication: Lumina (1903–1908; Bitola); Lumina (1936–1940; Grevena)

The Romanian High School of Bitola (Romanian: Liceul român or românesc din Bitolia; Aromanian: Litseul românescu di Bituli) was a boarding high school for boys in the Ottoman city of Bitola (Aromanian: Bituli or Bitule; Romanian: Bitolia; now in North Macedonia). Funded by Romania, it was one of the many Romanian schools opened for the Aromanians, a scattered Romance-speaking Balkan ethnic group. Bitola was at the time the most important cultural center for the Aromanians, with the city also having Romanian primary schools and a vocational school for girls, churches, a cemetery, a Romanian consulate and a library for them.

The Romanian High School of Bitola was founded in 1880, and its operation was financed virtually in full by the Romanian state. The high school provided boarding accommodation, meals and medical assistance for its students, who were Aromanians from all over the Balkans. The subjects taught were almost the same as those taught in high schools in Romania, and the high school had a clear orientation towards humanities, with many of its students becoming schoolteachers in particular. The high school became a gathering point for intellectuals who published multiple Aromanian magazines and newspapers, with the high school's own magazine Lumina standing out for its importance.

The high school played an important role in the efforts for the national awakening of the Aromanians, and a new generation of intellectuals was developed in it, with many notable Aromanian figures having been students or teachers at the high school. The high school was closed by the newly-arrived Serbian authorities in 1912. It is reported by some sources to have been moved to the Romanian high school in Grevena (Aromanian: Grebini; Romanian: Grebena), Greece, which opened in 1924 and suffered multiple problems during its functioning until its closure in 1945. The building of the former Romanian high school still exists in modern Bitola; as of 2013, it was used as a Macedonian primary school.

== Background ==
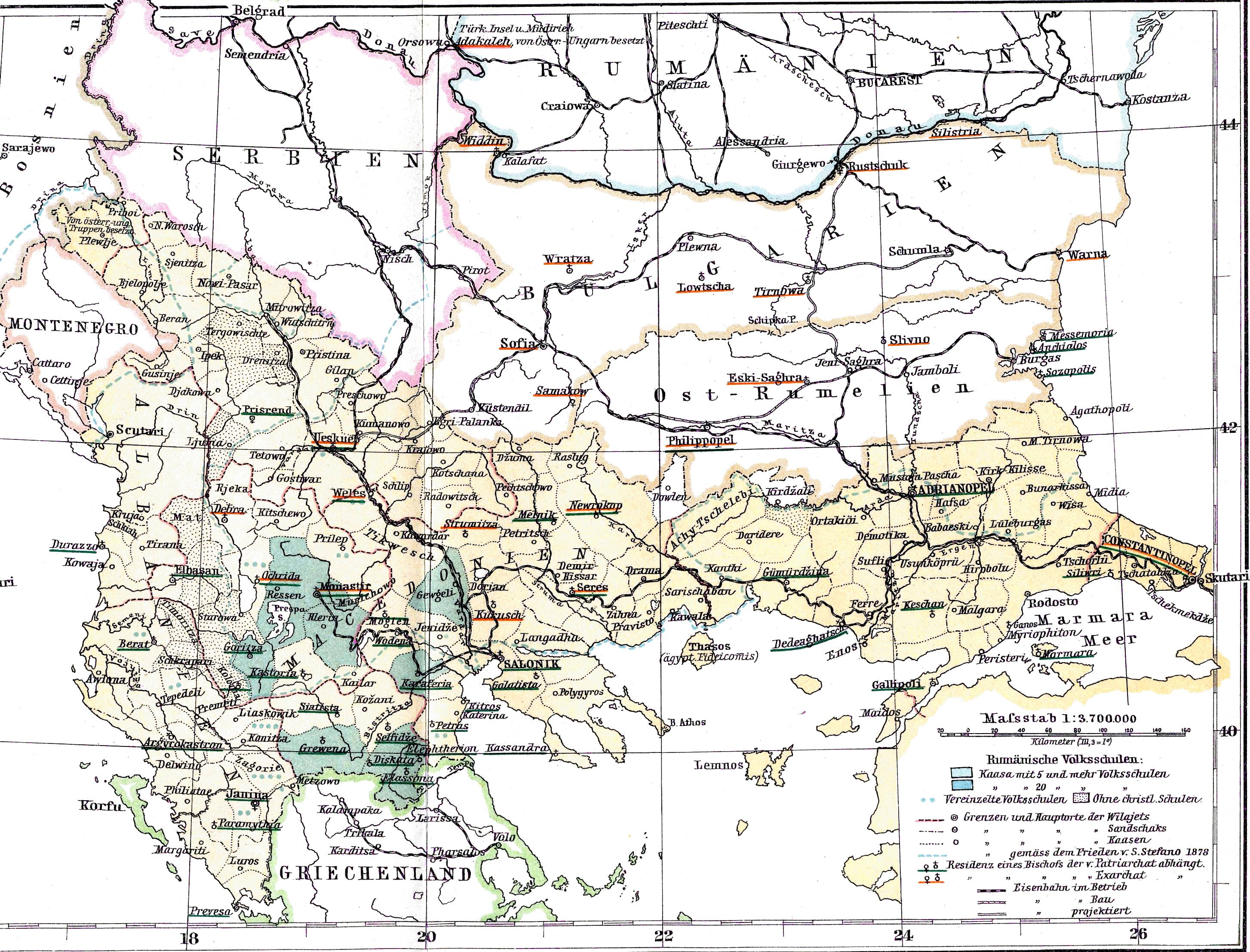
Map of the Romanian schools for Aromanians and Megleno-Romanians in the Ottoman Empire as of 1886. Bitola is labelled as "Monastir", and later relevant Grevena as "Grewena".

Starting from the second half of the 19th century, the city of Bitola (Aromanian: Bituli or Bitule; Romanian: Bitolia), then in the Ottoman Empire and now in North Macedonia, was the most important cultural center of the Aromanians, a scattered Romance-speaking ethnic group. Throughout the 19th century, Bitola had the largest urban population of Aromanians in their native Balkans, with an estimated 10,000 to 18,000 Aromanians out of a total population of 40,000–50,000. Bitola thus gained the title of "New Moscopole", Moscopole being a former metropolis that had great importance to the economic and cultural life of the Aromanians prior to its destruction.

In this context, between the second half of the 19th century and the first decades of the 20th century, Romania opened over one hundred primary schools and several secondary schools in settlements in the Balkans with Aromanian populations. Romania also opened churches for the Aromanians, which together with the schools contributed to the struggle for the awakening of their national consciousness. This way, as of 1900 for instance, there were 113 Romanian primary schools and five secondary schools in the Ottoman Empire, as well as over 30 churches where religious service was given in Romanian. Among these secondary schools was a boys' high school in Bitola and a vocational school for girls in the city established in 1888. The Aromanians of Ottoman Bitola also had several Romanian (as well as Greek for pro-Greek Aromanians) primary schools, two churches of their own, a cemetery where several relevant Aromanian figures were buried (Dimitri Atanasescu, Constantin Belimace, Apostol Mărgărit), a Romanian consulate and a library. An Aromanian church, the cemetery and a Romanian consulate still exist in today's Bitola.

== History ==
=== Founding and internal conflicts ===
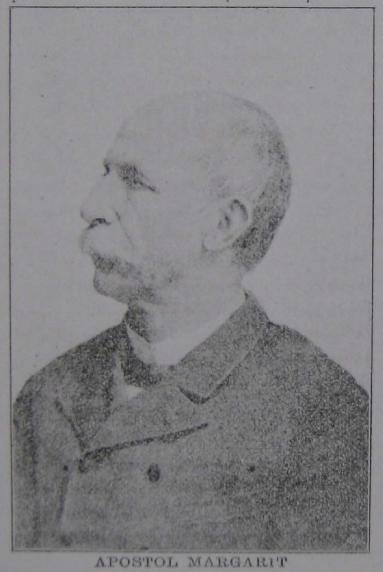
Aromanian educator Apostol Mărgărit, inspector of the Romanian schools in the Ottoman Empire. Mărgărit was involved in the establishment of the high school in Bitola and came into conflict with several of its teachers.

The Romanian High School of Bitola was established in June 1880 as a lyceum under the direction of Vasile Glodariu with the support of the Aromanian educator and schoolteacher Apostol Mărgărit. Glodariu was a Transylvanian Romanian "in whose chest boiled the fire of patriotism of Transylvania" according to Aromanian schoolteacher and his former student Ion D. Arginteanu. The high school was the first Romanian secondary school in the Ottoman Empire.

Throughout the high school's evolution, conflicts arose between Mărgărit, who was the inspector of the Romanian schools in Macedonia (Aromanian and Romanian: Macedonia), and a significant part of the teaching staff of the high school. In April 1883, the high school's director Ioan Gheorghiade Murnu and three teachers, Andrei Bagav, Constantin Cairetti and Vangheli Petrescu, left the high school with some students and founded their own school in a rented building due to their opposition to Mărgărit. These three latter teachers had left a strong positive impression on their students that lasted for a long time, with Arginteanu stating that "we students believed we were able to touch the sky with our hands and move the earth with our feet". Over this case, Dimitri Atanasescu, the first teacher of the Romanian schools in Macedonia, accused Mărgărit of "ruining the High School of Bitola". The situation would be repeated in 1890, when director Dimitrie Cosmulei and teachers Nicolae Maimuca and Ștefan Ciudela abandoned the high school. According to Romanian historian and politician Ion Solcanu, these conflicts were likely due to Mărgărit's "authoritarianism".

As a result of these conflicts, the Romanian Ephorate of Bitola was established in 1895 to direct the Romanian schools in the Ottoman Empire. Seven teachers and several students left the high school and founded a new one under the ephorate's administration, which became more relevant than the original one, and the two Romanian high schools operated separately in the city for three academic years (1894/1895 to 1896/1897) until they merged in 1898 under pressure from Romania's Ministry of Public Instruction.

=== Functioning and activities ===
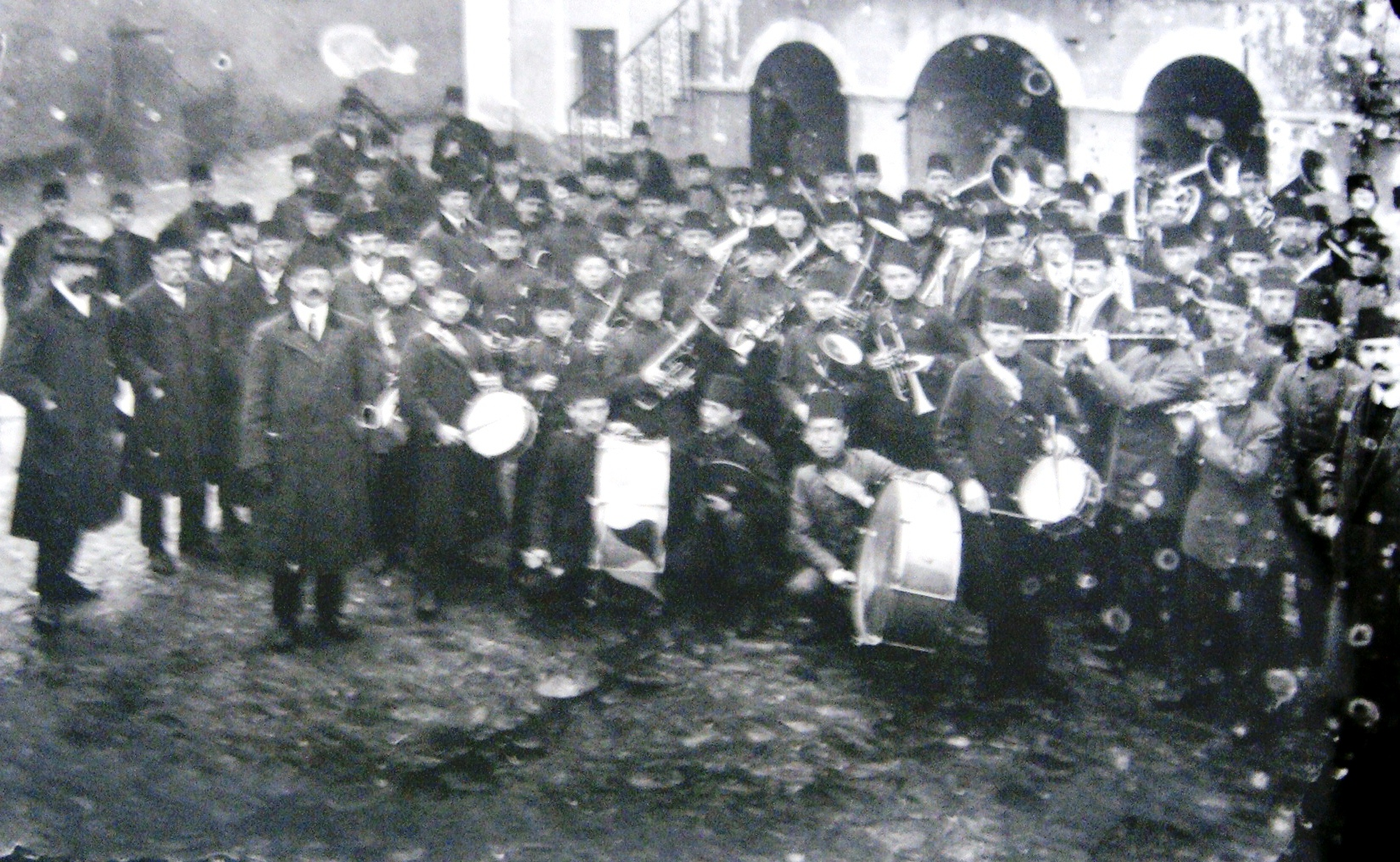
The high school's orchestra in 1905

The Romanian Ministry of Public Instruction financed in full the functioning of the high school: the rent of its building, the salaries of its teachers, boarding accommodation for 90 scholarship receivers and meals and medical assistance for the latter. The policy of the ministry stipulated that the teachers of Romanian schools in Macedonia should come from among local Aromanians trained in Romania. To the high school's financing also contributed sympathetic Aromanians who identified as Romanians.

At the high school in Bitola were taught the same subjects as those studied in high schools in Romania, with some differences due to local conditions such as the teaching of Greek and Turkish or the non-bifurcation of the curriculum at the higher years. Subjects taught at the high school included geography, mathematics, natural sciences, physics–chemistry, history, logic, philosophy, religion, multiple languages (Romanian, Greek, Turkish, French, German, Italian and Latin), Knowledge of Hygiene and Internal Medicine, Administrative Law and Comparative Romanian and Turkish. At both the boys' high school and the girls' vocational school, calligraphy, drawing, music and pedagogy were also taught, as they were subjects necessary for future teachers.

Young Aromanians from all regions of the Balkan Peninsula (Macedonia, Epirus, modern Albania) were recruited as students at the high school, not requiring an access exam. Initially most of the students came from Greek high schools. Only boys could attend the high school, with girls having their vocational school at the same city. Most of the high school's students were to become teachers in Macedonia, so from 1899 onward they took applied courses with students from the schools of Bitola in their final year. In the school year 1898/1899, the high school had 154 students divided into seven grades, of whom 116 passed their end-of-year exams, 25 failed some subjects and 13 had to repeat the year. From the first promotion in 1887 to 1900, 127 students graduated from the high school. Its teaching staff was composed of 14 teachers as of September–December 1897. The teachers of the high school had university diplomas from the University of Bucharest or the Universitas Claudiopolitana (now the Babeș-Bolyai University) in Cluj, Austria-Hungary (now Romania). Solcanu considered that in a 1900 memorandum by 15 teachers of the high school it was clearly asserted "the belief that Macedonian Aromanians are a component of the Romanian nation". The list of graduates published for the high school's 25th anniversary shows the humanistic orientation the high school had, as most of these graduates ended up studying humanistic careers and working in humanities-related occupations, including many schoolteachers.

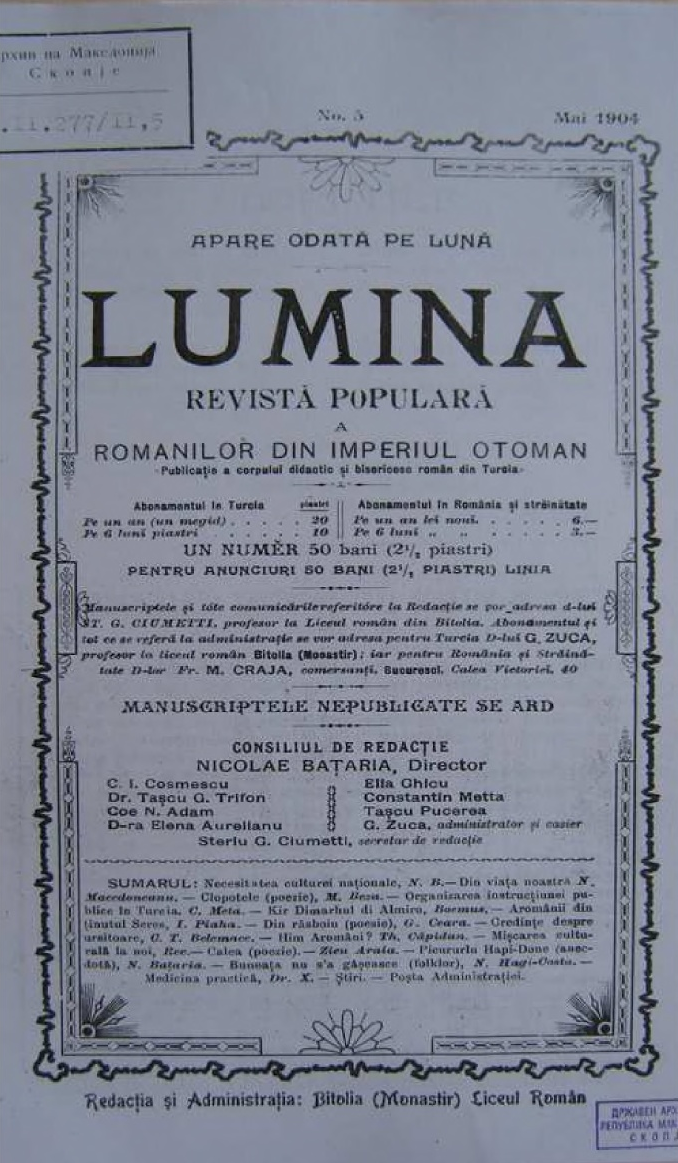
Cover of the May 1904 issue of Lumina ("The Light"), an Aromanian magazine at the redaction of which many people of the high school of Bitola were involved.

The high school in Bitola became a gathering point for the Aromanian intellectuals who published multiple Aromanian publications (magazines, newspapers, almanacs) at the end of the 19th century and the beginning of the 20th, in which they campaigned for the cultivation of writing in the Aromanian language. In particular, the magazine Lumina ("The Light"), the first Aromanian magazine published in the Ottoman Empire, appeared in January 1903 at the initiative of a group of teachers from the high school headed by Aromanian cultural activist, statesman and writer Nicolae Constantin Batzaria. The magazine featured much content of educational and didactic, but also political and national nature. Most of the articles were written in Romanian, and only a part in Aromanian. Published monthly by the House of the Romanian Didactic and Ecclesiastical Corps of the Ottoman Empire, Lumina was the magazine of the high school as stated by Romanian Aromanian editor, literary critic and writer Hristu Cândroveanu. It featured contributions from multiple notable intellectuals, including Zicu Araia, Batzaria himself, Leon Boga (in which he debuted as poet), Constantin Belimace, Theodor Capidan, George Ceara and George Murnu. Lumina was published until 1908.

In a 1955 book, the Romanian Aromanian scholar and then former politician and Iron Guard member Constantin Papanace noted two cases of attacks against students of the high school in Bitola by Greek andartes fighters: one by 30 andartes against seven student children accompanied by their teacher Trandafir Nicolau, with one of them reportedly wounded in the head and the others beaten with sticks; and another with knives and revolver shots by two hired assassins in December 1906. He also reported two separate attacks against Pericle Pucerea, then former director of the high school: one in July 1905, seriously injuring him with a gunshot, and another in September that same year.

=== Closure ===
Citing a 1913 report by the high school's administration to the Romanian consulate in Bitola, Romanian university professor Ionuț Nistor stated that the high school was closed on 23 October 1912, when it was transformed into a hospital for the wounded by the Serbian administration, as the Kingdom of Serbia had occupied the area during the First Balkan War. After Christmas, the last patients left the building, but the Serbian authorities did not return the building to the Aromanian community. Other researchers give a different date as for until when did the high school operate: until World War I (1914–1918; Gheorghe Zbuchea), 1915 (Nevaci) and 1918 (Adina Berciu Drăghicescu). According to the latter Romanian historian and professor, as of 1918, the modern territory of North Macedonia, then part of Serbia, included 24 Romanian primary schools operating in 18 villages, as well as the boys' high school and the girls' vocational school of Bitola. According to Berciu Drăghicescu, after 1918, the government of Yugoslavia (the state that succeeded the Kingdom of Serbia) closed all these schools and confiscated their buildings.

Nikola Pašić, prime minister of Serbia and Yugoslavia during his lifetime, stated that this persecution was due to the existence of a secret verbal convention in addition to the Treaty of Bucharest of 1913, which had ended the Second Balkan War, in which Romania had committed to help Serbia if it were attacked. As he stated, because Romania would not have honored said convention, Romanian cultural institutions in Serbian Macedonia had to be suppressed. In the aforementioned 1913 Treaty of Bucharest, Serbia, together with Bulgaria and Greece, had agreed to allow Romanian-funded schools and churches to operate on their territory under the supervision of their governments.

=== Transfer to Grevena ===
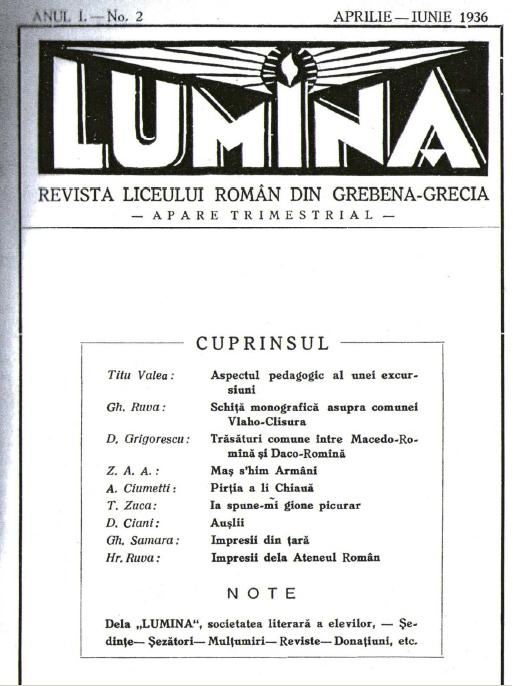
Cover of the April–June 1936 issue, its second issue ever, of the Romanian high school of Grevena's magazine Lumina.

Anton Ciumetti, who was director of the Romanian high school at the Greek town of Grevena (Aromanian: Grebini; Romanian: Grebena), asserted that the high school was a continuation of the one in Bitola, a claim supported by Romanian scholar and professor Paul Brusanowski. The high school was established in 1924 as a gymnasium, and it was first led by M. Samarineanu, being succeeded by Z. Popa Tănase in 1925. The high school became a lyceum in 1932. Its functioning and the appointment and salaries of its teaching staff were paid for by the Romanian government. The languages taught at the high school were Romanian, Greek and French. Year completion and graduation certificates were issued in Romanian, while the high school's seal was in Romanian and Greek. The high school had a quarterly magazine published from 1936 to 1940, which was also called Lumina. Among its contributors was the Aromanian poet, schoolteacher and separatist leader Zicu Araia, who had been a teacher at the high school since 1924.

The high school's students came from Aromanian-inhabited areas of Greek Macedonia and Epirus, and were divided into five grades. Boys wore hats while girls wore white berets. They studied with scholarships that offered them free accommodation and food, and graduates could study at higher education institutions in Romania if they so wished for free. According to Romanian university professor Maria Petre, due to the poor preparation with which students would leave the still gymnasium in Grevena, as well as that in Ioannina (Aromanian: Ianina or Enina; Romanian: Ianina) in Greece as well, some of them required a preparatory year to learn Romanian. The high school in Grevena was founded as a mixed (for boys and girls) gymnasium. According to Petre, it became boys-only when it became a lyceum. Nevertheless, the high school still had girl students in the school year 1939/1940.

As of 1930, the high school had 157 students (130 boys and 27 girls) and nine teachers. In 1935, while Ciumetti was the director, the high school had gotten appointed 12 teachers, but only nine had shown up for duty and four still required to take their capacity exam in Romania. This was an insufficient number of teachers, so some departments were not filled and graduates were unable to take their baccalaureate exams. In the school year 1939/1940, the high school had 177 students. According to Iancu Ballamaci, an Aromanian linguist and former president of the cultural association Aromanians of Albania, the following poem was sung by the students of the Romanian high school in Grevena:

Noi him armâńi
Armâńi di văr chiro
Și armâńi va s-him
Di-aoa șă nclo
Noi limba a noastră
Nu-u-agărșim
Și-u zburâm
Și ațeľi ți fug di-ia
Iľi șuguim.

Translation:

We are Aromanians
Aromanians from all times
And Aromanians we will be
From now on
Us our language
We do not forget
And we speak it
And those who run from it
We ridicule.

In a 1939 report by the Romanian consul in Ioannina, Vasile Știrbu, he mentioned the high school in Grevena as among the Romanian schools in Greece hosted in buildings rented for expensive sums "and often, without corresponding". Due to World War II and the subsequent Axis occupation of Greece, the Romanian schools in Greece, then composed of 29 primary and four secondary schools, were closed during the school year 1940/1941, reopening in autumn of the latter year in extremely difficult conditions. The high school in Grevena functioned in the town until February 1943, taking refuge in Thessaloniki (Aromanian: Sãrunã; Romanian: Salonic) together with Grevena's Romanian primary school as a result of the expulsion of Italian occupation forces from Grevena by Greek resistance forces of the ELAS. The school year 1943/1944 thus began at the high school in Thessaloniki on 1 November 1943, having 149 students.

According to Berciu Drăghicescu, at the end of May 1944, Romanian secondary school courses in Greece were closed, and ten graduates of the high school in Grevena took their baccalaureate exams, becoming the last promotion to obtain graduation diplomas, which they could not use as Greek law did not validate them. The Romanian high school in Grevena last functioned in 1945 according to Solcanu and Greek lieutenant general and historian Christos D. Vittos; according to the latter, in 1946, with the ongoing imposition of a communist regime in Romania, financial aid to the Romanian schools in Greece was completely cut off and the schools ceased definitively to function.

=== Modern situation and legacy ===
As of 2013, a Macedonian primary school functioned at the building of the former Romanian high school of Bitola. Romanian professor, literary critic and publicist Nistor Bardu stated in 2019 that the building, which as of then no longer belonged to the local Aromanian community, "impresses even today with its remarkable architecture"; Nevaci also described the building as one of the most beautiful of Bitola. According to her, attempts had been made for several years as of 2013 to re-establish a high school teaching in Romanian and with classes in Aromanian with the support of the Romanian state.

Romanian researchers Anca Tanașoca and Nicolae Șerban Tanașoca stated that the high school of Bitola was "the highest Romanian educational institution in the Ottoman Empire", with Papanace considering it "the most important high school for the Aromanians". Romanian schoolteacher Anastasie Hâciu defined the high school in Bitola as "The high academy of the Balkans [...] grandiose in its novelty and imposing [...] culture that it spread for nearly four decades". According to Papanace, both the high school in Bitola and the Macedo-Romanian Cultural Society had "a great influence over the happy course of the actions of national reawakening of the Aromanians", and "their elite was formed" in the high school; Solcanu too asserted that a new generation of intellectuals was formed in it.

== Notable alumni and teachers ==
=== Alumni ===
In Bitola:

- Zicu Araia (1877–1948), Aromanian poet, schoolteacher and separatist leader
- Nicolae Constantin Batzaria (1874–1952), Aromanian cultural activist, statesman and writer
- Marcu Beza (1882–1949), Aromanian writer, publicist, folklorist and diplomat
- Leon Boga (1886–1974), Aromanian writer, schoolteacher and archivist
- Tache Caciona (1885–1971), Aromanian writer and publicist
- George Ceara (1880/1881–1939), Aromanian writer and schoolteacher
- Sterie Ciumetti (1870–1933), Aromanian engineer and schoolteacher
- Ion Foti (1887–1946), Aromanian writer, journalist and translator
- Yanaki Manaki (1878–1956), Aromanian photographer and cinema operator
- Filip Mișea (1873–1944), Aromanian activist, physician and politician
- George Murnu (1868–1957), Aromanian writer, professor, scholar and translator
- Constantin Noe (1883–1939), Megleno-Romanian editor and professor
- Tache Papahagi (1892–1977), Aromanian folklorist and linguist
- Nuși Tulliu (1872–1941), Aromanian writer
- Nicolae Velo (1882–1924), Aromanian poet and diplomat

=== Teachers ===
In Bitola:

- Nicolae Constantin Batzaria (1874–1952), Aromanian cultural activist, statesman and writer
- Sterie Ciumetti (1870–1933), Aromanian engineer and schoolteacher
- Mihail Dimonie (1870–1935), Aromanian botanist, schoolteacher and entrepreneur

Furthermore, Aromanian poet Constantin Belimace, author of the Aromanian anthem Dimãndarea pãrinteascã ("The Will of the Forefathers"), worked as bursar for the high school in Bitola.

In Grevena:

- Zicu Araia (1877–1948), Aromanian poet, schoolteacher and separatist leader
