= Papahagi =

Papahagi is an Aromanian surname that may refer to:

- Adrian Papahagi (born 1976), Romanian philologist, essayist and politician
- Marian Papahagi (1948–1999), linguist, literary critic, essayist and translator
- Pericle Papahagi (1872–1943), Ottoman-born Romanian literary historian and folklorist
- Tache Papahagi (1892–1977), Ottoman-born Romanian folklorist and linguist
