= Cola Nicea =

Aromanian revolutionary in Ottoman Macedonia

Voivode Cola Nicea
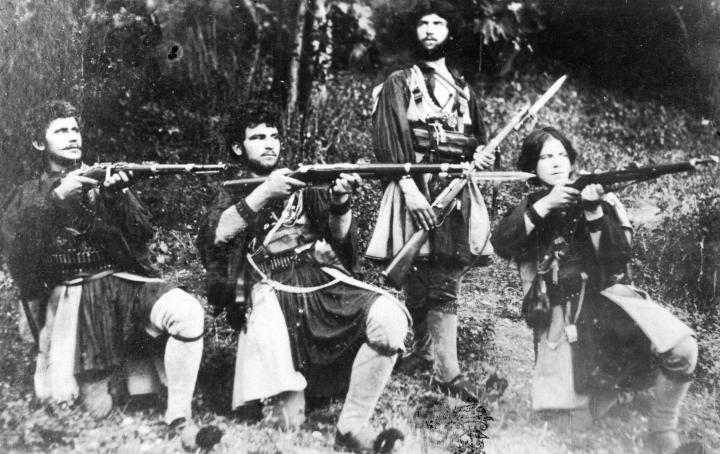
- Cola Nicea (leftmost person) and his band in 1907, in Veria; photograph by the Manaki brothers
- Born: 1886; Kato Seli, Ottoman Empire (now Greece)
- Died: Unknown
- Allegiance: IMRO
- Conflicts: Macedonian Struggle
- Education: Commercial Lyceum of Thessaloniki

Cola Nicea (1886 – ?; Bulgarian and Macedonian: Кола Нича, Kola Nicha; Greek: Νικόλαος Νίτσια, Nikolaos Nitsia) was an Ottoman-born Aromanian armatole revolutionary during the Macedonian Struggle. He was part of the first Aromanian band of the Internal Macedonian Revolutionary Organization (IMRO), leading it as voivode for a time. Once the conflicts in Macedonia ended, Nicea emigrated to Romania.

During the last years of his life, Nicea wrote Memorii ("Memoirs"), one of the only first-hand accounts on the Aromanian fighters during the conflicts in Ottoman Macedonia. It provides valuable information on the identity and motivations of these Aromanians and on their collaboration with the IMRO, as well as on the ethnic dynamics of the time.

== Biography ==
=== Early life, fighting and aftermath ===
Cola Nicea was born in 1886 in Kato Seli (now Kato Vermio, Aromanian: Selia de Jos or Selia), then in the Ottoman Empire and now in Greece. He was an ethnic Aromanian armatole revolutionary during the Macedonian Struggle. Nicea studied at the Commercial Lyceum of Thessaloniki (one of the Romanian schools in the Balkans), standing out for having been one of the few Aromanian armatole leaders who had a high school degree.

In 1907, Nicea joined the first Aromanian band in the Internal Macedonian Revolutionary Organization (IMRO). Created one year earlier, this band operated in the areas of Giannitsa, Veria and Vodena for almost two years. Initially led by Ioryi Mucitano, he was succeeded as leader of the band by Mihail Handuri in August 1907 and he in turn by Nicea, who became the voivode of the band in May 1908. By this point, the band had decreased substantially in size and now consisted only of four to five soldiers. It was unable anymore to pose a threat to the ethnic Greek andartes fighters it had been combating, and the band was chased by them up until the Young Turk Revolution of July 1908.

After the end of the Macedonian Struggle and of World War I, Nicea emigrated to Bazargic (now Dobrich), in the region of Southern Dobruja that Romania had annexed from Bulgaria in 1913. Many of his comrades from the times of the Macedonian Struggle settled in the town as well. After Southern Dobruja was returned to Bulgaria in 1940, Nicea moved to Constanța, in Romania's Northern Dobruja.

=== Writing, publication and analysis of Memorii ===
Shortly before his death, Nicea wrote Memorii ("Memoirs") based on the written account of his own memories and on old notes he managed to find. Some of these notes were elaborated on and supplemented by the Romanian Aromanian poet Nicolae Caratană. After a failed publication attempt in the 1970s, Nicea's memoirs remained unpublished up until the fall of the communist regime in Romania. Thus, in 1990, Nicolae Cușa published Nicea's testimony of the conflicts in Macedonia in the form of a diary in his book Macedoromânii pe văile istoriei ("Macedo-Romanians in the Valleys of History"). Furthermore, during the 1990s, fragments of Nicea's full memoirs were published in the Aromanian magazine Deșteptarea ("The Awakening"), edited by Hristu Cândroveanu. It would not be until 2001 that the original and complete version of Nicea's memoirs would be published in the fifth issue in December of that year in the Romanian religious magazine Scara. In 2013, the Avdhela Project digitized Scara's printed edition and published it online open to free download.

Romanian researcher Vladimir Crețulescu sees great value in Nicea's Memorii, regarding it as deserving of greater attention from scholars in the field of Aromanian studies. Today, it constitutes one of the only first-hand accounts on the actions, beliefs and convictions of the Aromanian armatole revolutionaries of the time. Memorii shows Nicea's use of ethnic ethnonyms for the peoples of Macedonia, notably his use of "Romanian" to refer to the Aromanians; this places his work firmly within pro-Romanian Aromanian discourse. He also employs "Macedonian" in a broad, multiethnic yet cohesive sense to refer to the people of the geographic region of Macedonia. Furthermore, despite making no explicit clarifications on his use of the term, Nicea uses "Bulgarian" to refer to the IMRO and to the movement for an autonomous Macedonia, and not to the unionist movement for integrating Macedonia into Bulgaria. This does not necessarily rule out a cultural, ethnic and identitarian sense in the designation. Several contemporaneous IMRO members ascribed such connotations to it, while still advocating for the independence of Macedonia. Such a thing could explain the ample and indiscriminate use of "Bulgarian" by Nicea. Also remarkable in Memorii is Nicea's insight on the subject of the collaboration of the Aromanians with the IMRO and his presentation of the Aromanian armatoles within the geographical and historical context in which they found themselves.

Crețulescu explains that the value of Nicea's memoirs lies on their use not as a historical source but as a source on how the Aromanian armatoles saw themselves, their actions and their surroundings and on how they interacted with the peoples neighboring them. The credibility of the memoirs as a historical source is problematic due to the difficulty of corroborating Nicea's writings and to the fact that the memoirs were written many years after the events that they describe occurred. Macedonian Aromanian historian Nikola Minov also impels caution when using the memoirs as a historical source, this according to him due to "obvious exaggerations" in them and because it would not be known to what extent Nicea was the author of the memoirs; Minov says the latter due to Caratană's interventions on the notes that were used.
