= Haralampije Polenaković =

Macedonian literary historian and lexicographer

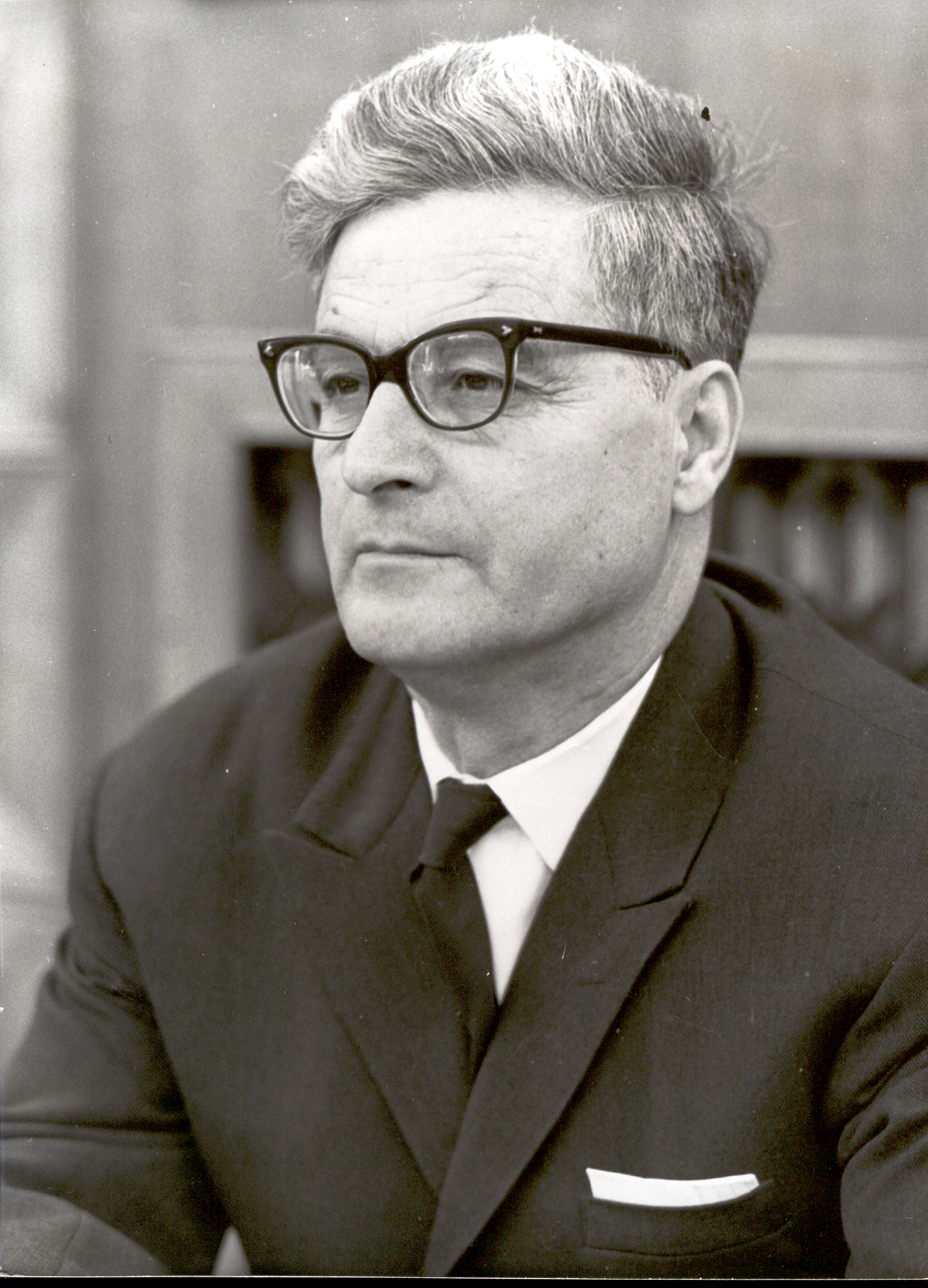
Haralmpie Polenaković in 1975

Haralampije Polenaković or Haralampie Polenakovikj (Macedonian: Харалампие Поленаковиќ; Aromanian: Haralampie Polenacovici; Serbian: Харалампије Поленаковић; 17 January 1909 – 15 February 1984) was a Yugoslav and Macedonian literary historian and lexicographer.

== Biography ==
Haralampije Polenaković was born on 17 January 1909 into a family of Aromanian settlers from present-day southern Albania, in the town of Gostivar, Ottoman Empire (present-day North Macedonia), where he had his elementary education. According to the Macedonian Aromanian publicist, translator and writer Dina Cuvata, he spoke Aromanian "very well". Per Macedonian Bulgarian academic Mihail Ognyanov, Polenaković's family members were Serbomans, and out of respect towards it, he retained the suffix -ić in his surname.

In the Kingdom of Yugoslavia, Polenaković was part of the pro-Serbian intelligentsia of Vardar Banovina. Around 1934, he collaborated with the academic Petar Kolendić. He graduated from the Philosophical Faculty in Skopje and then continued his studies in Zagreb, where he obtained a PhD in 1939. In the same year, Polenaković worked as an assistant at the Faculty of Philosophy in Skopje, being one of the few local staff members there, due to the authorities' requirement to appoint only nationally conscious Serbian cadres there. Polenaković attempted to construct an interpretation of the Slavic cultural development in 19th-century Ottoman Macedonia, ignoring the influence of the Bulgarian National Revival. He discovered a manuscript of a homily in Aromanian, written in the Greek alphabet, in Gorna Belica, after which he informed Romanian Aromanian linguist Theodor Capidan, who published the manuscript in 1940. During the Bulgarian occupation of Yugoslav Macedonia in World War II, a law was passed, by which all Slavic inhabitants were granted Bulgarian nationality, except, those who chose to opt for their former nationality and thus many Serbs had to emigrate. Polenaković escaped to Belgrade in Nazi-occupied Serbia, where he served as the president of the "Society of Refugees from South Serbia".

After the war, Polenaković worked as a professor at the Philosophical Faculty in Skopje. He is credited as one of the founders of Macedonian literary science. His fields of research included medieval literature, 19th-century literature and the ties between Macedonian, Serbian and Croatian literatures. Polenaković was a member and the first vice-president of the Macedonian Academy of Sciences and Arts, as well as a member of the Serbian Academy of Sciences and Arts and the Academy of Sciences and Arts of Bosnia and Herzegovina. Together with the linguist Blaže Koneski, he edited the Macedonian edition of the Encyclopedia of Yugoslavia. Polenaković's works, collected in five volumes, were published in 1973. He died in Skopje on 15 February 1984.

== See also ==
- Venko Markovski
