= George Ceara =

Aromanian poet and prose writer

- Born: 18 October 1880/1881; Xirolivado, Ottoman Empire (now Greece)
- Died: 4 April 1939 (aged 57–58); Cavarna, Romania (now Kavarna, Bulgaria)
- Education: Romanian High School of Bitola
- Occupations: Writer, schoolteacher, armatole
- Writing career
- Genres: Poetry, prose

George Ceara (also Ceară; 18 October 1880/1881 – 4 April 1939; Aromanian: Ioryi Ceara) was an Aromanian poet, prose writer and schoolteacher. He was born in Xirolivado in the Ottoman Empire, now in Greece, and was raised in a transhumant lifestyle. After graduating from the Romanian High School of Bitola, he entered the University of Bucharest in Romania, though circumstances did not allow him to graduate.

Ceara was afterwards appointed teacher at Romanian schools in Ossiani, Kriva Palanka and Veria in his native region, later also teaching at Cavarna in Romania. He fought during a period of his lifetime as an armatole and was the director of the magazine Flambura ("The Banner"). His figure stands out above all as a writer, having written poetry but also prose in both Aromanian and Romanian. He focused on folklore and life motifs such as longing, and his poems, all written to be sung, are based in Aromanian folk songs and lyrics. His poem Ñi pitricu mușeata-ñi dor ("My Dear Sent Me Longing") greatly surpassed Ceara in popularity.

== Biography ==
=== Education, profession and personal life ===
George Ceara was born on 18 October, in either 1880 or 1881 or even before 1880 according to the "indirect information" the Romanian Aromanian folklorist and linguist Tache Papahagi claimed to collect. Ceara was born in the Aromanian village of Xirolivado (Aromanian: Xirolivad, Xirolivadi, Xirulivad, Xirulivadi or Xirulivadu), then in the Ottoman Empire and now in Greece. He had seven brothers and one sister, and his nephew, Ilie Ceara, became a writer as well.

Ceara had his primary education in Xirolivado during the spring and in an unnamed settlement of his fellow villagers during the fall and winter. This situation was typical among transhumant Aromanians, who used to take their children's teachers along with their flocks of sheep on their seasonal migrations. Ceara then studied at the Romanian High School of Bitola, after which he entered the Faculty of Letters of the University of Bucharest in Romania. He studied at the university for two years, being exmatriculated in 1906. According to the Romanian Aromanian editor, literary critic and writer Hristu Cândroveanu, Ceara could not graduate due to the precarious material situation of his family. However, the Romanian researcher and history teacher Evantia Bozgan stated instead that this would have been due to Ceara's civil status documents not matching with his high school degree, a result of the Ottoman Empire's faulty bureaucracy, making his definitive enrolling into the university not possible. Such a situation would have occurred to several other Aromanian students at the university.

Back into his native region, Ceara was afterwards appointed teacher at Romanian schools for Megleno-Romanians in Ossiani (Megleno Romanian: Oșani; now Archangelos) in 1906 and in Kriva Palanka in 1907. He was then appointed teacher at the Romanian school in Veria, a town close to his native village, in 1908; as of 1922, he was still teaching at the school. For a period of his lifetime, Ceara fought as an armatole, becoming captain of a cheta. According to the Macedonian Aromanian publicist, translator and writer Dina Cuvata, he did this to help the Aromanians from "the terror and killings" of the Greek andartes bands of the Macedonian Struggle, who "had the objective of making the Aromanians Greek". Ceara was the director of the magazine Flambura ("The Banner"), having also written for the newspaper Ecoul Macedoniei ("The Echo of Macedonia"). He identified with Romania, making his affiliation very clear in an Aromanian-language article titled Cari him ("Who are we"), written for Flambura together with Dumitru Badralexi, in which they wrote: "We answer that we are Romanians, ancestors of the Roman legionaries, who kept under their command the entire world".

Ceara died on 4 April 1939 in Cavarna, Romania (now Kavarna, Bulgaria), where he had been teaching up until then.

=== Literary work ===
Cândroveanu described Ceara as a "sensitive, delicate" poet as well as a "folk singer" very close to folklore, from which he received great inspiration. Ceara featured motifs from folk lyrics and took care to maintain the prosodic structure of the folk songs from which he based his writings, with all his poems being written to be sung. Ceara's literary production is for the greatest part in Romanian, with Papahagi stating in his 1922 anthology of Aromanian literature that Ceara could be considered not so much a writer of Aromanian literature as of Romanian literature and that the history of Romanian literature ought to take into account Aromanian authors such as him. Ceara's works gained him notable fame during his lifetime.

An example of Ceara's work is the poem Cîntec ("Song"), with the subtitle motiv folcloric ("folk motif"), in which a young and beautiful Aromanian woman, "kidnapped" by her own pride, asks a spring, the water of which she is looking at herself in, if it can tell her who will enjoy the wonders of her body, to which the stones from which the water gushes respond Io, feată, va ti l'iau, / Și io va li hărsescu! ("I, girl, will take them, / And I will enjoy them!"). Cândroveanu explained that this is a folk motif present in other national literatures as well. Another poem, Te-aștiptai ("I'm Still Waiting for You"), talks about the perplexity of a shepherd who lately sees himself being avoided by the girl he loves, who is not necessarily said to love him back.

Ceara's Ñi pitricu mușeata-ñi dor ("My Dear Sent Me Longing") is a poem that according to Cândroveanu became so famous "that no one associates it today with the name of its author". In the poem, a woman writes a love letter to her boyfriend (or possibly husband), attaining great eloquence even without directly expressing her feelings. Through the letter, her lover finds out that, since he left, his ewe lambs have gotten sick, having rotted the pen, left unkempt, that sheltered them; and that the beeches, pines, and springs weep longing for him. The letter suggests him that he might miss everything he left behind, including his lover herself, and it ends with a direct call back to home and to her; according to Cândroveanu, this final part of the letter is proof that erotic sentiment, even if normally expressed discreetly in Aromanian lyric poetry, can sometimes appear by surprise. The following is the poem's last verse:

Aromanian original

O, lai gione, gionle-a meu,
Si-ñi te-agiungă dorlu greu,
Dorlu greu di vîcil'i-a tăi,
Și di doil'i-ñi ocl'i lăi,
Și s-te-aducă cama tr-oar',
Gione picurar!
Vinu, gione, vinu, frate,
Nu-i picat di-a meale ñiate,
Gione picurar?"

Translation:
English translation (Note: Based in Cândroveanu's Romanian translation of the poem in Cândroveanu 1985, pp. 195–196.)

My dear, oh — my dear,
May the heavy longing reach you,
The longing of white ewe lams,
And of my eyes like emeralds, —
Return on the wind, on a cloud,
My dear shepherd!
Come, don't be late,
For my time is passing,
Dear shepherd!"

Ceara did not only write poetry, but also prose. In an article for the Romanian magazine Societatea de Mâine, Vasile Christu described Ceara's novels as being "soaked in a doleful lyricism". Among these novels is Candela vieții ("The Candle of Life"), in which the problem of death is described with all the occurrences a shepherd goes through in his fight against Death. A "true jewel" of Aromanian literature as he defined it, Christu praised the novel's deep psychological analysis and stated it deserved to be translated into every language.

Ceara did not manage to publish all his work separately, but rather it remained scattered in the different Aromanian publications of his time, a common situation for contemporary Aromanian writers. Flambura featured some of his Aromanian- and Romanian-language works, and his works were also featured in Lumina ("The Light") and in Almanahul Aromânesc "Frățil'ia" (" "Brotherhood" Aromanian Almanac"). Cuvata noted that Ceara's poems were included in all anthologies of Aromanian poetry; regarding this, the Romanian Aromanian professor Gheorghe Carageani stated that Ceara was featured in these anthologies "with maximum four poems", which he found too few in number for him to be able to express a precise opinion on his work. All of Ceara's notebooks with poems were lost during World War I. As of 2001, a collection of his published poems had been awaiting publication by Editura Cartea Aromână "for a long time" according to Cuvata.
