= Sterie Diamandi =

Ottoman-born Romanian biographer and essayist

Sterie Diamandi (August 22, 1897 – June 11, 1981) was an Ottoman-born Romanian biographer and essayist.

He was born into an Aromanian family in Metsovo (Aromanian: Aminciu), a town that formed part of the Ottoman Empire's Manastir Vilayet and is now in Greece. His father, Vasile Diamandi-Aminceanu, advocated on behalf of the Aromanians and published the 1938 study Românii din Peninsula Balcanică. After attending primary school in his native town, he went to Romanian-language high schools in Thessaloniki, Ioannina, Bitola, and Bucharest. He attended the literature and philosophy faculty of the University of Bucharest, where he was president of the Macedonian students' association and graduated magna cum laude in 1922. Diamandi taught school in Turnu Severin, Roman, Iași, and Bucharest. His contributions appeared in the Iași Almanahul Școlii Normale "Vasile Lupu", as well as in Gândul vremii, Minerva, and Vremea școlii. His first publication, the 1923 study Contribuția aromânilor în literatura neogreacă, was published in Peninsula Balcanică magazine. His first book was Galeria oamenilor politici (1935), followed by Eroii revoluției ruse (1937), Galeria dictatorilor (1938), Oameni și aspecte din istoria aromânilor (1940), Fiul lui Dumnezeu – Fiul Omului (vol. I-III, 1942-1943), and Arca lui Noe. Together with several other authors, he wrote an Abecedar (primer) in 1932.
