= Malovište =

Malovište Маловиште (Macedonian) Mulovishti (Aromanian)
- Village
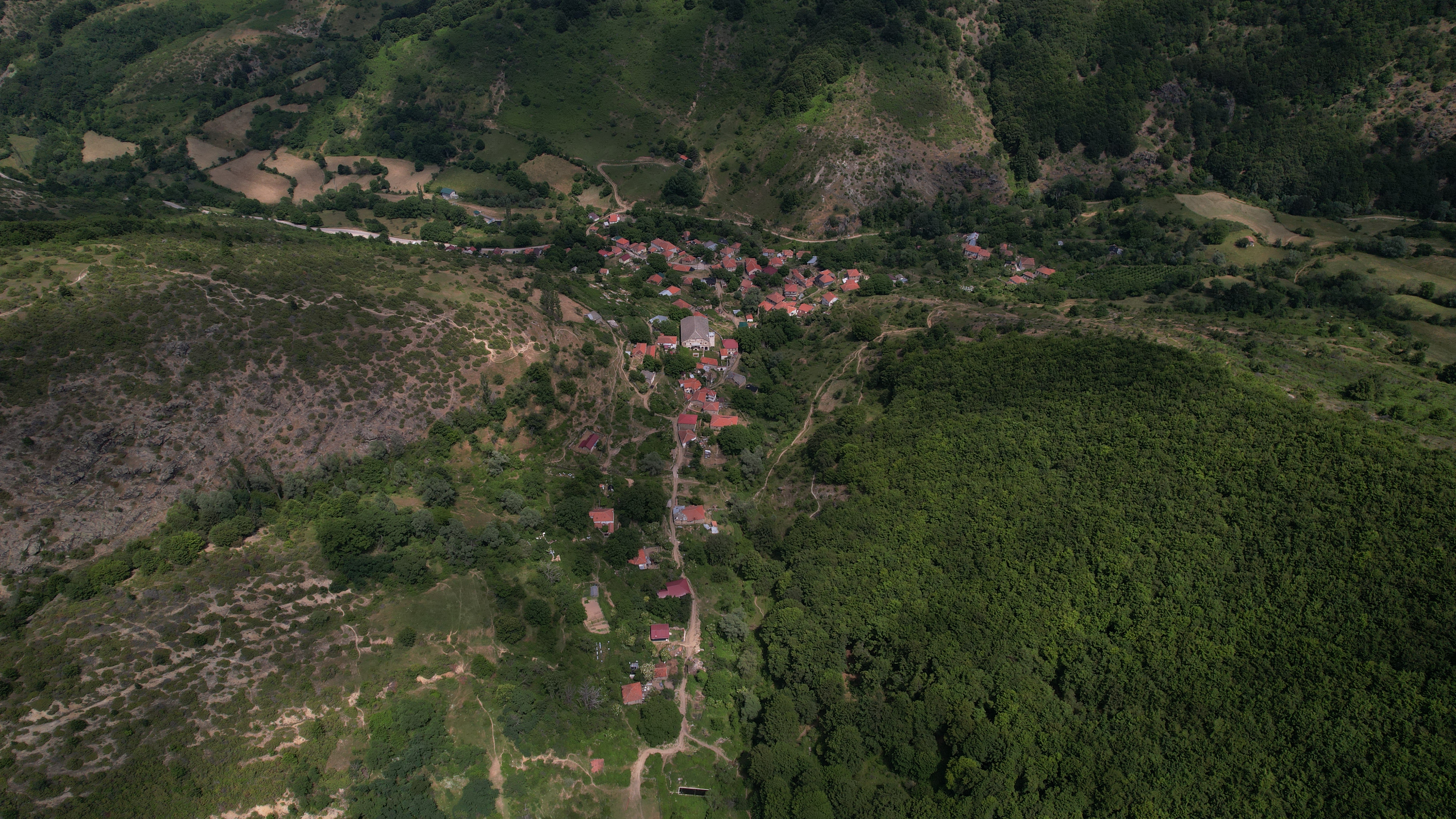
- Air view of the village

- Location within North Macedonia
- Coordinates: 41°02′N 21°08′E
- Country: North Macedonia
- Region: Pelagonia
- Municipality: Bitola

Population (2002)
  - Total: 98
- Time zone: UTC+1 (CET)
  - Summer (DST): UTC+2 (CEST)
- Car plates: BT
- Website: .

Malovište (Macedonian: Маловиште, Aromanian: Mulovishti) is an Aromanian village in the municipality of Bitola, North Macedonia. It used to be part of the former municipality of Capari.

== History ==
Malovište is an old Aromanian settlement in the region and its establishment dates possibly prior to the Ottoman conquest of the Balkans. During the first World War, Malovište was occupied by the Bulgarian military who evacuated most of the Aromanian villagers and sent them into the interior of Bulgaria and Serbia. The relocation of local Aromanians was due to Bulgarian forces being concerned that pro-Greek and pro-Serbian sympathies existed among them resulting in possible cooperation with the Entente Allies. While in exile, some villagers had to fend for themselves whereas others for the Bulgarians did forced labour.

In August 2013, an Aromanian cultural event was held in Malovište. It was partly sponsored by the Open Society Foundations.

== Demographics ==
According to the 2002 census, the village had a total of 98 inhabitants. Ethnic groups in the village include:

- Vlachs (Aromanians) 87
- Macedonians 10
- Albanians 1

== Notable people ==
- Constantin Belimace (1848–1932), Aromanian poet in Romania and Yugoslavia
- Cezar Papacostea (1886–1936), Aromanian classicist and translator in Romania
- Dumitru Pasima (1935–2022), Aromanian sculptor in Romania
- Nicolae Velo (1882–1924), Aromanian poet and diplomat in Romania

Furthermore, the Romanian-born French academic, editor and linguist Nicolas Trifon had origins from Malovište.
