= Pericle Papahagi =

Aromanian literary historian and folklorist

Pericle Papahagi (1872 – January 20, 1943) was an Aromanian literary historian and folklorist.

He was born into an Aromanian family in Avdella (Avdhela), a village that formed part of the Ottoman Empire's Manastir Vilayet and is now in Greece. After attending school in his native village and in Bucharest in Romania, he graduated from the literature faculty of the University of Bucharest. He then went to Leipzig University, where he studied under Gustav Weigand and earned a doctorate in philosophy. Papahagi taught high school in Ottoman Thessaloniki and Bitola, in Bulgarian Silistra, and in Giurgiu, Romania. His first published work, which appeared in Analele Academiei Române in 1893, was a collection of children's folklore, Jocuri copilărești. Culese de la românii din Macedonia. His contributions also appeared in Analele Dobrogei, Arhiva, Convorbiri Literare, Frățil’ia, Grai bun, Grai și suflet, Jahresbericht des Instituts für rumänische Sprache zu Leipzig, Peninsula Balcanică, Revue historique de sud-est européen, Viața nouă, and Viața Românească. He headed Dunărea magazine, which appeared in two volumes in 1923. In 1916, he was elected a corresponding member of the Romanian Academy. In the 1919 1919 Romanian general election, he was elected to the Senate of Romania, representing the Durostor County.

An acknowledged authority on the life and languages of the Romance-speaking peoples from south of the Danube, the Aromanians and Megleno-Romanians, he wrote several foundational texts on the subject that are classic models of sociological and folkloristic monographs. These include: Din literatura poporană a aromânilor, 1900; Românii din Meglenia. Texte și glosar, 1900; Meglenoromânii. Studiu etnografic, vol. I-II, 1902; Basme aromâne și glosar, 1905; Scriitori aromâni în secolul al XVIII-[lea], 1909; and Poezia înstrăinării la aromâni, 1912. Together, by taking a combined approach to linguistics and folklore, they prefigure the methodology of Ovid Densusianu's philological school. He died in Bucharest and was buried in Silistra.

== See also ==
- Tache Papahagi
