= Theodor Capidan =

Romanian linguist

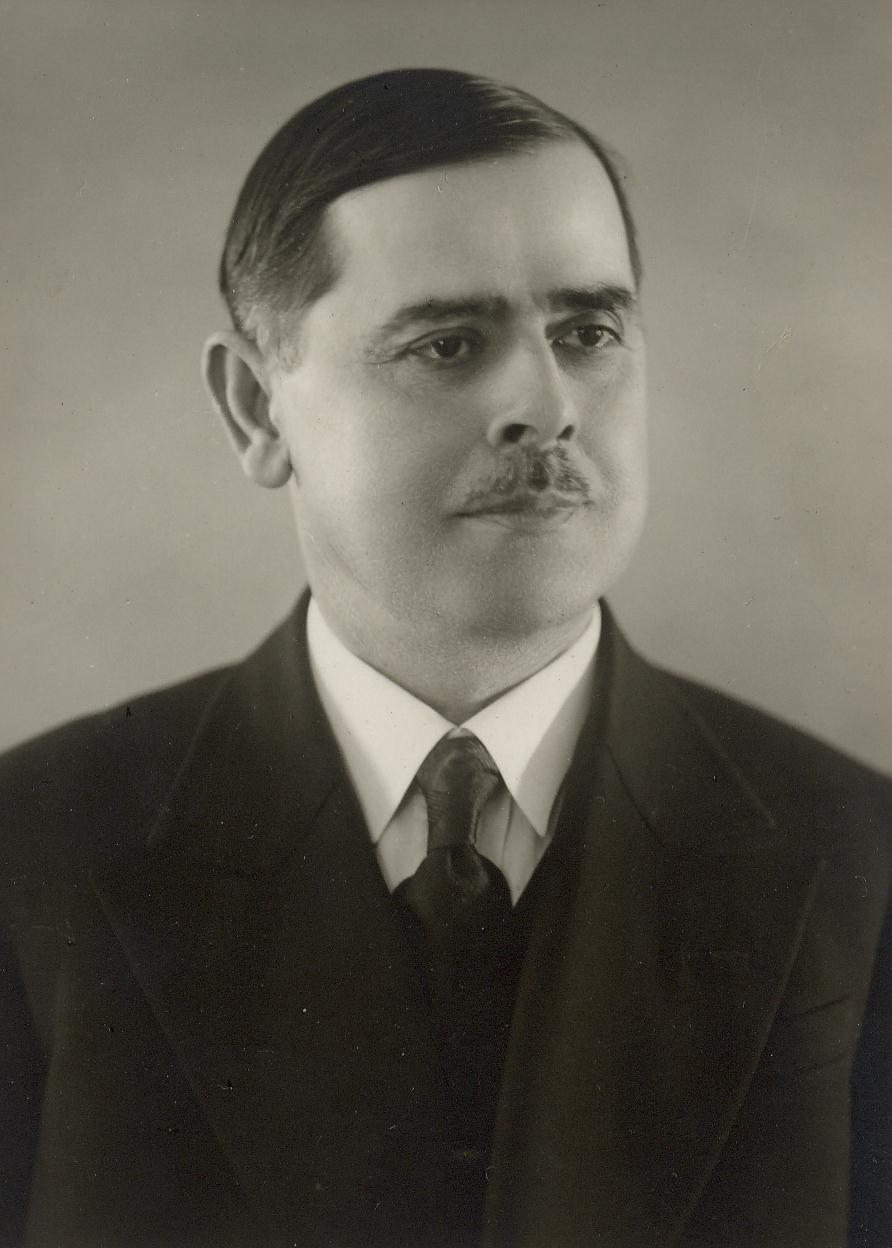
Theodor Capidan

Theodor Capidan (April 28 [O.S. April 15] 1879 – September 1, 1953) was an Ottoman-born Romanian linguist. An ethnic Aromanian from the Macedonia region, he studied at Leipzig before teaching school at Thessaloniki. Following the creation of Greater Romania at the end of World War I, Capidan followed his friend Sextil Pușcariu to the Transylvanian capital Cluj, where he spent nearly two decades, the most productive part of his career. He then taught in Bucharest for a further ten years and was marginalized late in life under the nascent communist regime. Capidan's major contributions involve studies of the Aromanians and the Megleno-Romanians, as well as their respective languages. His research extended to reciprocal influences between Romanian and the surrounding Slavic languages, the Eastern Romance substratum and the Balkan sprachbund, as well as toponymy. He made a significant contribution to projects for a Romanian-language dictionary and atlas.

== Biography ==
=== Origins and early career ===
He was born into an Aromanian family in Prilep, a town that formed part of the Ottoman Empire's Manastir Vilayet and is now in North Macedonia. His parents were the tailor Teohari Capidan and his wife Eugenia Vreta. After attending primary school in his native town, he followed his elder brother Pericle, a future painter, in emigrating to the Romanian Old Kingdom. Slated to become a Romanian Orthodox priest, he studied at the central seminary in Bucharest, but decided he had a different vocation and left in order to pursue a teaching career. Capidan returned to Macedonia, where he was hired at the Romanian High School of Bitola and displayed talent in teaching Romanian and German. With the help of the Romanian consul, he obtained a scholarship that allowed him to study Romance philology at Leipzig University from 1904 to 1908. His professors included Karl Brugmann, Gustav Weigand, August Leskien, Eduard Sievers and Wilhelm Wundt. His thesis, awarded cum laude, dealt with Aromanian linguistics. While a student, Capidan published his first works on Aromanian dialectology and cultural history. After graduating and until 1909, he served as assistant at Weigand's Balkan Institute. In 1907, he met and began a lifelong friendship with Sextil Pușcariu, who, after putting him through a three-month trial period in Czernowitz, invited the student to help with his Romanian-language dictionary project.

In 1909, he was named Romanian language professor at the Romanian Higher School of Commerce in Thessaloniki. The following year, he became director of an institution he transformed into an exemplary place of learning, preparing not just economists but also students with an aptitude for science and literature. Capidan was at the school until 1919, and used this period for research. He gathered dialectal, linguistic and folkloric material for future studies, undertook fieldwork and also used as subjects his students, Aromanians and Megleno-Romanians who came from throughout the Balkan peninsula. He wrote studies of linguistics and ethnography, and collaborated on Pușcariu's dictionary. In 1909, he penned a reply in French to those who questioned whether the Aromanian language is Romance in origin and character. Titled Réponse critique au Dictionnaire d'étymologie koutzovalaque de Constantin Nicolaïdi, it features both an argument based on science and a satirical flourish. This paved the way for other polemical writings in which he Aromanians' Romance character.

=== Cluj years and move to Bucharest ===
During World War I, in common with the majority of Aromanian intellectuals in Macedonia, Capidan entered the Thessaloniki-headquartered Armée d'Orient as a volunteer. After the war and the union of Transylvania with Romania, he was invited by Pușcariu to help place the new Superior Dacia University in Cluj on a solid foundation. From 1919 to 1924, he was associate professor in the Romanian language and dialectology department, lecturing on Aromanian and Megleno-Romanian. From 1924 to 1937, he was full professor of sub-Danubian dialectology and general linguistics. The Cluj years were the most productive and happiest of his life. He was among the most important representatives within the school of linguistics that centered around Pușcariu. He worked diligently at the Museum of the Romanian Language and was a consistent contributor to its journal, Dacoromania. He continued to provide input on the dictionary as well as on the Romanian Linguistic Atlas.

His contribution to the dictionary involved an enormous sacrifice of time and energy; the work was exigent and tiresome. Pușcariu recalled how his colleague, together with Constantin Lacea, would sit daily in front of files for three or four hours, more than once ripping apart an article on which they had worked for a week and restarting in a more logical fashion. Regarding the linguistic atlas, his assistance to Sever Pop involved material on the Aromanians and the Megleno-Romanians. The favorable intellectual climate in Cluj fostered his seminal works on the Aromanians and Megleno-Romanians, establishing him as an authority in the field. Elected a corresponding member of the Romanian Academy in 1928, he was elevated to titular status in 1935. His maiden speech, on the Balkan Romance peoples, was followed by a warm welcome from Pușcariu.

In 1937, Capidan was invited to the University of Bucharest, where he was made head of the comparative philology department heretofore led by the late Iuliu Valaori. He remained there until 1947, when he was obliged to retire. Extending his scientific interests into a wider field, he used his knowledge of linguistics and of the Balkan languages to emerge as a researcher with original views in the comparative study of the Indo-European languages. He also spurred development of the area among Romanian academics. He relaunched the Thracological studies of Bogdan Petriceicu Hasdeu, employing more modern methods. He published a critical and historical study of Hasdeu, placing him in the context of the development of Romanian linguistics and philology and championing his merits as an Indo-Europeanist. For years, his laudatory view of Hasdeu retained a definitive status in regard to this sphere of his activity. Capidan held a special course on Thraco-Phrygian, later turning the material into a study on guttural occlusives in Thracian. He also published a series of etymological notes on the extinct language in the bulletin of the Academy's literary section, which he co-edited with his friend Dumitru Caracostea. He collaborated closely with Victor Papacostea at the latter's Institute of Balkan Studies, and in editing Balcania magazine. Together with Papacostea and George Murnu, he published Revista macedo-română.

In 1948, the new communist regime stripped him of Academy membership after Capidan refused to sign an adulatory telegram for Joseph Stalin. However, upon the intervention of Iorgu Iordan, he was allowed to continue working on the dictionary as an outside collaborator with the Linguistics Institute. Still involved with the project until his last months, when weakening vision forced him to abandon it, he died in 1953. In accordance with his wishes, was cremated in a simple ceremony. Capidan was married to Iulia George Dan, a housewife. The couple's only child, Emil, was born in 1912 and studied literature and philosophy at Cluj.

== Work ==
=== Aromanian and Megleno-Romanian language and society ===
Capidan's research interests focused on the realities of the sub-Danubian Romance peoples, the Aromanians and the Megleno-Romanians. He published numerous articles and studies on the subject, culminating in two valuable monographs that have been called classics of the field. His writing on linguistics combines a rich linguistic analysis with geographic, historical and socio-cultural facts about the peoples he studied, looking at their lifestyle and ethnographic profile. He helped resolve the controversy over where their ethnogenesis took place. By looking at certain linguistic peculiarities, he concluded that the proto-Romanian language was divided into two zones. One was the northern, which developed into Daco-Romanian (from which Istro-Romanian later split); and the southern, which subsequently became differentiated into Aromanian and Megleno-Romanian. At the same time, he defended the notion of Megleno-Romanian as a separate dialect, noting the existence of nearly forty fundamental differences with Aromanian.

Employing findings drawn from fieldwork, Capidan made observations about the bilingualism or even multilingualism of the sub-Danubian Romance peoples, and was the first Romanian scholar to study this phenomenon systematically. He classified bilingualism into two types: natural or unconscious, and deliberate or scholarly. He discussed the causes, evolution and implications of bilingualism, discovering evidence of linguistic interference, the first step toward the dialects' convergence and ultimate disappearance.

=== Balkan language theories ===
Fluent not only in these two Romance languages, but also in Bulgarian, Greek, Albanian and Turkish, he studied the relationship between Romanian and the Balkan languages. Within this context, he addressed the issue of the Eastern Romance substratum. Initially, he believed that only a small part of the common features displayed by Romanian and Albanian were due to a shared native element, attributing the great majority of links to a reciprocal influence. He later radically changed position, asserting that these commonalities were mainly due to a joint pre-Roman lineage. Capidan argued that the substrate's influence was visible not only at the lexical level, but also in phonetics and morphology. He noted that a part of the substrate elements extant in Daco-Romanian are absent south of the Danube.

Capidan studied various issues relating to linguistic and cultural ties between Romanians and Slavs. He argued that Old Slavic influence on Romanian began at some point in the 8th or 9th century, and that most of this influence came from Bulgarian, while a part was Serbian. Analyzing the common Slavic lexicon of Daco-Romanian, Aromanian and Megleno-Romanian, he found 72 such terms. However, he noted that the latter two languages may have absorbed a part of these from Albanian or Greek at a later date, after splitting off from proto-Romanian. At the same time, Capidan was the first linguist who undertook a systematic study of Romanian's influence on the South Slavic languages. Although his comments on Serbian were limited to a few observations, he wrote an ample study with regard to Bulgarian.

Although his original contributions regarding the Balkan sprachbund were few, he and Pușcariu were among those who laid the foundation for strictly scientific research into cultural and linguistic relations among the Balkan peoples. Capidan believed that the region's languages shared certain words pertaining to a common civilization, remarkably similar in their semantic evolution, as well as common traits in phraseology and proverbs. However, he thought that their morphological construction was more divergent. Thus, while initially embracing the sprachbund idea, he eventually came to reject the idea of a linguistic union comparable to the Romance or Germanic languages, as well as an approach that studied the Balkan languages as being related.

=== Toponymy ===
Capidan was interested in toponymy, particularly south of the Danube. During his Leipzig days, he delivered a report on the Slavic place names of Thessaly and Epirus. Over the years, he offered etymological explanations for a large number of place names. He used several of these to argue for the idea that certain Aromanians were native to Greece, basing the theory on their phonetic transformations found only in the Latin elements of Romanian. Other names helped determine their inhabitants' occupation, leading him to conclude that the Megleno-Romanians' involvement with sheepherding was as extensive as their agricultural work.

In his later years, Capidan published the first book on Aromanian and Megleno-Romanian toponymy, as well as a Romanian toponymic dictionary. The latter work included an important finding on rural Geto-Dacian toponymy: that place names, usually four-syllabled, were composed of a variable determinant and an invariable determined element. The invariable portion was -dava in Geto-Dacian and -para in Thracian south of the Danube. Capidan was the first to attempt to explain why the two differed, somewhat anomalously since the Geto-Dacians and the Thracians spoke the same language. He proposed that the difference lay in the physical characteristics of the land occupied by the two groups. Drawing on Indo-European roots, he indicated that the suffix -para suggests a ford, crossing or path, and is suitable to Thracian settlements, typically found in valleys, along roads and paths. On the other hand, -dava refers to settlements or villages. This arose out of the Geto-Dacians' main occupation as farmers, their villages scattered among fields. Capidan asserted that they felt the need to name these placed with a term meaning, simply, "settlement".
