= Mihail Dimonie =

Aromanian botanist, teacher and entrepreneur (1870–1935)

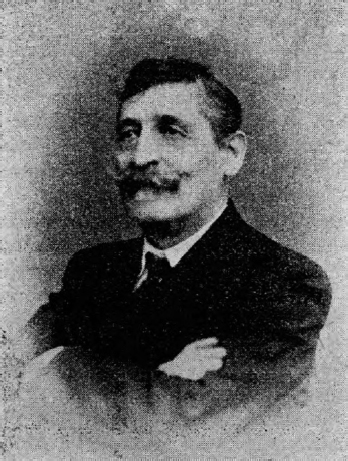
- Born: 1870; Ohrid, Ottoman Empire
- Died: 8 December 1935; Bucharest, Romania
- Occupations: Teacher, botanist, entrepreneur

Mihail Dimonie, also known as Mihael Dimonie (1870 – 8 December 1935), was an Aromanian botanist, teacher and entrepreneur who is recognized as the foremost plant collector in the southern Balkans in the early 20th century before the World War I.

== Biography ==
Dimonie was born in 1870 in Ohrid (Aromanian: Ohãrda) in what was then Manastir vilayet of the Ottoman Empire. He came from a well-standing Aromanian family; with the help of Mihail and his brother Iancu, Gustav Weigand notably discovered the Codex Dimonie, a comprehensive collection of early Aromanian-language religious texts presumably co-authored by their great-uncle, at the house of the Dimonie family in Ohrid in 1889.

Mihail was sent to study in Romania to become a teacher and after completing his studies at the University of Bucharest with a teaching degree, he returned to Macedonia to become a science teacher at the Romanian High School of Bitola. After that, he taught science at a grammar school in Caracal, at a forestry college in Brănești and, until 1912, at a commercial high school in Thessaloniki. After the outbreak of the First Balkan War, Dimonie returned to Caracal where he became professor at the Ioniță Asan gymnasium (now the Ioniță Asan National College), serving also as the school's principal for a time. He retired as a teacher in 1933.

Dimitrie Grecescu, professor of medical botany in Bucharest, sparked his interest in medical plants and Dimonie remained an active collector for the rest of his life. At first, he was collecting herbarium samples around Ohrid, Bitola, and around Baba Mountain, then turned to the flora of Oltenia in southwest Romania. He created a series Plantae Macedonicae and began to distribute it commercially to established European institutions. His personal southern Balkans collection was destroyed in the Great Thessaloniki Fire of 1917. Dimonie had planned to prepare a doctorate in botany after retiring, but this was prevented by the death of his friend and mentor Nicolae Iacobescu. Instead, Dimonie started to develop cultivation of velvetleaf for fiber in Brăila County, in cooperation with a British entrepreneur.

He died suddenly in Bucharest on 8 December 1935, aged 65.

== Botanical legacy ==
Dimonie was a passionate plant collector. His collections from the southern Balkans, the European part of the Ottoman Empire, are considered the most important for science. He obtained numerous specimens from the territory of today's North Macedonia, northern Greece and the north Aegean islands of Lemnos and Thasos. He was among the first to study flora of the Pirin Mountains in today's Bulgaria. Many of his preserved herbarium sheets are now difficult to ascribe to a location because he was using Turkish toponyms or omitted the location entirely, treating the specimens simply as part of Plantae Macedonicae which refers to the entire historical region of Macedonia. Working before comprehensive literature of the flora of this area was available, his determinations were often erroneous. Nevertheless, he is considered one of the most important collectors of his time and his specimens are still being used by plant taxonomists. His contribution to Aromanian cultural heritage is also noteworthy: he collected plant names in the Aromanian language and noted ethnobotanical aspects on his travels.

Apart from Plantae Macedonicae, he created two large personal collections, but both were destroyed – the one kept in Thessaloniki in 1917 and the second, kept by Grecescu, during an Allied air raid on Bucharest in 1944.

Dimonie did not have access to institutional herbaria and botanical literature because of his modest position, and was faced with time constraints as well. He was thus unable to publish his findings. Instead, other authors published numerous records based on his specimens, among those several taxa new for science. Most of those were later synonymyzed, but several remain valid. Of those, two species are named after Dimonie: the hawkweed Hieracium dimoniei Zahn. from the Korab mountains and the mullein Verbascum dimoniei Velen. collected in the vicinity of Gevgelija.

== Publications ==
The following is a list of selected publications by Dimonie:

- Dimonie, Michele (Mihail), Grecescu, Dimitrie. Plantes De La Macedoine Appartenant Au Vilayet De Monastir, 1899, ISBN 978-1160227940.
