= Leon Boga =

Aromanian writer, schoolteacher and archivist in Romania

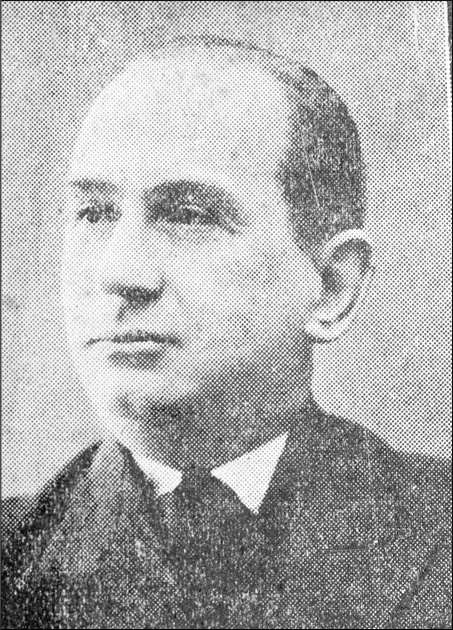
- Born: Leonida T. Boga; 12 January 1886; Veles, Ottoman Empire (now North Macedonia)
- Died: 1974 (aged 87–88); Vaslui, Romania
- Education: Romanian High School of Bitola; University of Bucharest
- Occupations: Schoolteacher, archivist, editor, writer and poet
- Writing career
- Pen name: Leon Boga, Nida Boga, L. T. Boga
- Notable work: Voshopolea

Leonida T. Boga (12 January 1886 – 1974), better known as Leon Boga (also Nida Boga and L. T. Boga), was an Aromanian writer, schoolteacher and archivist in Romania. His most notable work, Voshopolea ("Moscopole"), started the trend in Aromanian literature of an ideal and utopian Moscopole, today a village in Albania which was a major metropolis with an important Aromanian population during the times of the Ottoman Empire.

== Biography ==
Leonida T. Boga was born on 12 January 1886 in Veles, then in the Ottoman Empire and now in North Macedonia. He first attended a Greek-language school and later a Romanian-language one, both in his hometown. He then enrolled at the Romanian High School of Bitola, contributing during his studies to the high school's monthly magazine, Lumina. Boga studied geography and history at the University of Bucharest and became a schoolteacher in several localities in Romania. He fought as a volunteer in the Romanian Land Forces during the Second Balkan War and World War I, participating in the battles at Nămoloasa and Mărășești along with several other Aromanian volunteers.

After World War I, Boga was appointed teacher in Chișinău, in Romanian Bessarabia (now in Moldova). He also became manager of the National Archives of Chișinău and edited 20 volumes of documents on the history of Bessarabia and two volumes on 17th-century Wallachia. Boga also wrote poems and stories in the Aromanian language. Having been one of the most productive Aromanian writers, he signed some of his works as "Leon Boga" or "L. T. Boga", reserving for his most mature works the name of "Nida Boga", which to him felt like a more familiar Aromanian name. Romanian literary critic Constantin Sorescu regarded Boga's works as so important to Aromanian literature that he considered him a potential recipient of the Nobel Prize, just like French writer Frédéric Mistral was awarded it for his Occitan-language works. Following the establishment of the communist regime in Romania after World War II, Boga was harassed and questioned by the Securitate, the secret police agency of the regime, for having been a functionary of the Romanian administration of Bessarabia, which by then had already been lost to the Soviet Union.

Boga's most important work was Voshopolea ("Moscopole"), written between 1947 and 1950. It is an epic poem of 150 sonnets which gave birth to the Aromanian literary trend of the utopian Moscopole. Moscopole, today a village in Albania, was a prominent metropolis in Ottoman times with an important Aromanian population, which was destroyed by Ottoman Albanian ruler Ali Pasha of Ioannina in the 18th century. In Voshopolea, Boga narrates the foundational myth of Moscopole, according to which it was founded by Aromanian shepherds. He writes how the prosperity and economic life of the founder shepherds increased as the city developed, in part thanks to trade, with both shepherding and trading being regarded as traditional Aromanian occupations. Furthermore, in the poem, God, generous to the Aromanian nation for having given it such a place, helps and accompanies the founding and development of Moscopole, with Boga putting great effort in describing the religious elements and rituals in his utopian Moscopole. Boga allocates Moscopole exclusively to Aromanians and Christians, describing it as a "wholly Aromanian city" in which "there is no trace of Turkish or Muslim presence". Muslims generally receive the most blame for Moscopole's destruction in this literary trend.

After the death of his wife, Boga moved to Ploiești to live with his daughter Silvia. She died as well, and Boga moved to Vaslui, living with his physician son Nicolae. As Boga had sold his apartment in Bucharest after his wife's passing, splitting the profit between his two children, he retired to the Agapia Monastery in Agapia, living in a meager hermit room, where he continued writing until his last days. Feeling ill, he sensed his death was imminent and wrote what would be his last poem, a soliloquy titled Cîntic mănăstiresc ("Monastic Song"). Boga died in 1974, in a hospital in Vaslui.
