= Constantin Ucuta =

Aromanian academic and protopope

- Born: Moscopole, Ottoman Empire
- Occupations: Academic, protopope
- Known for: The publication of the first Aromanian phonetic and orthographic system

Constantin Ucuta was an Aromanian academic and protopope. He was born in Moscopole, an economically powerful city and Aromanian centre at the time then part of the Ottoman Empire and now part of Albania. He migrated to Posen, in Prussia (now Poznań, in Poland), and entered in contact with the small Aromanian community in the city, mostly composed by merchants. He became an academic and a protopope, serving in a church in Posen most likely erected by the typically Eastern Orthodox Aromanian merchants of the city. Other details about Ucuta's biography are scarce and poorly known.

Ucuta published in 1797 in Vienna, in the Habsburg monarchy, the primer Νεα Παιδαγωγία (Nea Paidagogía, "New Pedadogy"), written in Aromanian but with the Greek alphabet. Its full title is "The New Pedagogy, or the Easy Primer to Teach the Aromanian Youth How to Use Aromanian in Particular, compiled and edited, for the first time, by the holy Constantin Uncuta the Moscopolian, hartifilax and archpriest in Posen, southern Prussia, and printed for the glory of the [Aromanian] people in Vienna, 1797, by Puǐlǐu Marquises Printer's". It was published at the publishing house of the Markides Pouliou brothers, who were Aromanians like Ucuta. Ucuta's premier represented one of the first signs of an Aromanian national awakening during the 18th century together with the works of a few other authors.

On his work, Ucuta stressed the importance of having a primer for the Aromanian people and of teaching Aromanian children their native language. Ucuta also lamented what he called the forgetting of the Aromanians' language, as well as their "dogmas of faith". For his primer, Ucuta established a system of phonetics and spelling for the Aromanian language. He gave a grapheme for each Aromanian phoneme, although for those phonemes without equivalents in the Greek alphabet he combined two or three Greek letters. This way, Ucuta's primer became the first Aromanian phonetic and orthographic guide. To argue his defense of the Aromanian tongue, he cited Paul the Apostle's 1 Corinthians 14 of the New Testament, more precisely verses 14, 15 and 16, which incite to the use of one's mother tongue for prayer. Ucuta also included a translation of the Lord's Prayer from Greek to Aromanian. Another important feature of his work is the way he called the Aromanians: "Romanian-Vlachs", speaking "Romanian-Vlach". He might have drawn a connection between the Aromanians and the Romanians after being influenced by the community of Aromanians then present in Transylvania (at the time part of the Habsburgs and now part of Romania) which in some years after 1797 would attempt to write texts in their own language, or more possibly by one of Johann Erich Thunmann's historical operas in which he commented on the affinities between both peoples, although it is uncertain.

Ucuta's primer may have been used by children and adults of the Aromanian community of Posen; if this was the case, it would have been their first time seeing their native language written down into a full work. It may also have been used in his native Moscopole, as the work reached the locality. It was from an Aromanian living in Bitola (then in the Ottoman Empire, now in North Macedonia) with origins from Moscopole that Ucuta's primer became known in Romania. This was in 1907 after the Romanian philologist, bibliographer and member of the Romanian Academy Ioan Bianu acquired Ucuta's work from this person, after which it was studied several times in the country.

== See also ==
- Aromanian diaspora
