= Aromanian music =

Music of the Aromanians

Aromanian music (Aromanian: Muzica armãneascã) is the music characteristic of the Aromanians. The Aromanians are an ethnic group scattered throughout the Balkans, living in Albania, Bulgaria, Greece, North Macedonia, Romania and Serbia. Aromanian music has received influence from the music of other ethnic groups of the Balkans, such as that of the Albanians, Bulgarians, Greeks, Macedonians, Romanians and more. However, it has developed throughout history its own distinctive features and peculiarities that set it apart from other Balkan music genres, and has also influenced the music of the previously mentioned peoples.

Aromanian music has not been extensively studied by researchers, often being overshadowed by the music of other ethnic groups in the Balkans. One of the main characteristics of Aromanian music is the importance of polyphonic music (music with two or more performers), as Aromanian musicians tend to perform in groups. The performance of polyphonic music follows a series of common rules among the Aromanians. For example, there is always a lead singer who starts the song and acts as a leader, known in Aromanian as the atselu tsi u lja ("the one who takes it [the song]"). There is also a second singer, atselu tsi u talji ("the one who cuts it"), who begins singing shortly after the main singer, as well as other positions. Monophonic music (music with one single performer) is also present in Aromanian music, and has historically been more researched than Aromanian polyphonic music.

Despite being a unitary music genre, Aromanian music has several variations, styles and ways of performing it that can be classified according to the countries in which they live and which in turn can be subdivided into more variations and styles. Some of the subgenres of Aromanian music include ballads, dancing songs, epic songs and lyrical songs.

Today, there are several projects and cultural organizations advocating for the preservation of the music of this ethnic group. An example is the Lunjina Serbian–Aromanian Association in Serbia, which in 2021 announced that it was working on the publication of a CD of traditional Aromanian music. Another example is the Conservation and promotion of the singing traditions of the Fãrsherot Aromanians of Dobruja project, organized by several Aromanian organizations in Romania.

Some examples of popular Aromanian music performers or musicians of Aromanian ethnicity include Eli Fara, Elena Gheorghe, Nikos Karakostas, Takis Mousafiris, Dimitris Mitropanos, Toše Proeski, Parashqevi Simaku, Vassilis Tsitsanis and Adrian Uzum. A notable Aromanian song is "Dimãndarea pãrinteascã" ("The Will of the Forefathers"), often used as the ethnic anthem of the Aromanians. Another popular Aromanian song is the traditional Di la Aminciu pãn' la Ameru ("From Metsovo to Milea").

== See also ==
- Polyphonic song of Epirus
