= Nicolae Șerban Tanașoca =

Romanian historian and philologist

- Born: 3 October 1941; Bucharest, Kingdom of Romania
- Died: 7 April 2017 (aged 75); Bucharest, Romania
- Occupations: Historian, philologist

Academic background
- Education: University of Bucharest
- Thesis: (1979)
- Doctoral advisor: Haralambie Mihăescu

Academic work
- Discipline: Classical philology Balkan studies Byzantine studies Ottoman studies
- Institutions: Institute of South-East European Studies of the Romanian Academy

Nicolae Șerban Tanașoca (3 October 1941 – 7 April 2017; Aromanian: Nicolae Sherban Tanashoca) was a Romanian historian and philologist. An ethnic Aromanian, he specialized in the study of classical philology, Byzantine and Ottoman studies and cultures of the Balkans, including the Aromanians.

== Biography ==
Nicolae Șerban Tanașoca was born on 3 October 1941 in Bucharest, in the Kingdom of Romania. He was born in a family of ethnic Aromanians. His mother was the second cousin of the Aromanian neuropsychiatrist Florica Bagdasar. After completing his undergraduate studies at the University of Bucharest in 1964, Tanașoca obtained his Ph.D. in 1979 from the Faculty of Classics of the same university; his thesis, on the influence of Latin on Byzantine Greek vocabulary, was written under the direction of Haralambie Mihăescu. Tanașoca specialized in the study of classical philology and Balkan cultures, including the Aromanians, of which he published several works. He was also considered a specialist in Byzantine and Ottoman studies.

Tanașoca was the director of the Institute of South-East European Studies of the Romanian Academy. He was a monarchist, and was involved in the activities of the Carmen Sylva Research Center of the Princely Archive of Wied. He was given the Cross of the Royal House of Romania by former King of Romania Michael I on 11 December 2008. Tanașoca held the position of vice president of the Macedo-Romanian Cultural Society for a time. Having been a Romanian Orthodox Christian, he was also one of the members of the Patristic Commission of the Romanian Patriarchate, having helped in the translation of several works of the Church Fathers into Romanian.

Tanașoca died in Bucharest on 7 April 2017 and was buried in the city's Bellu Cemetery. His family was given condolences by Patriarch Daniel of Romania and by Margareta of Romania and the Romanian royal family.
