= Constantin Belimace =

Aromanian poet

- Constantin Belimace
- Born: July 1848; Malovišta, Rumelia Eyalet, Ottoman Empire
- Died: 1932; Bitola, Kingdom of Yugoslavia
- Occupation: Poet
- Notable work: Cucotul, Dimãndarea pãrinteascã
- Parent: Tașcu Belimace (father)

Constantin Belimace (July 1848 – 1932) was an Aromanian poet.

== Biography ==
He was born into an Aromanian family in Malovišta (Mulovishti), a village that formed part of the Ottoman Empire's Rumelia Eyalet and is now in North Macedonia. His father was Tașcu Belimace. He attended school in his native village and at a Serbian school in Belgrade.

In 1873, he moved to Bucharest, capital of the Romanian Old Kingdom. There, he opened a restaurant favored by students, particularly from south of the Danube, and by writers.

In the enthusiastically patriotic atmosphere that followed the Romanian War of Independence, Belimace began composing poems, thus becoming among the first writers in the Aromanian language: "Cucotul" (Romanian: "Cocoșul"; "The Rooster") and "Dimãndarea pãrinteascã" ("Porunca părintească"; "The Parents' Command"). These appeared, respectively, in România and Voința națională. Later, together with others, they were published in Andrei Bagav's 1887 Cartea de alegere (Cartea de citire; Reader).

Belimace helped found the Macedo-Romanian Cultural Society and the Lumina association, and took part in editing periodicals such as Frațil'ea într'u dreptate and Macedonia. His contributions appeared in Frațil'ea, Grai bun, Lumina, Peninsula Balcanică and Românul de la Pind, as well as in various calendars and almanacs. After returning to Macedonia, he worked as a supervisor at the Romanian boarding high school in Bitola.

During World War I, he was held hostage in Bulgaria for two years. He died in Bitola in 1932, when the city was in the Kingdom of Yugoslavia.

Belimace belonged to the Farsherot subgroup of the Aromanians.
