= Nicolae Velo =

Aromanian poet and diplomat

- Born: Nicolae C. Velo; 1882; Malovište, Ottoman Empire
- Died: 1924 (aged 41–42)
- Education: Romanian High School of Bitola; Higher School of State Sciences
- Occupations: Poet, diplomat

Nicolae C. Velo (1882–1924) was an Aromanian poet and diplomat in Romania. He was born in 1882 in Malovište (Aromanian: Mulovishti), then in the Ottoman Empire and now in North Macedonia. After studying at the school in his hometown, Velo entered the Romanian High School of Bitola, still in the Ottoman Empire, and later the now defunct Higher School of State Sciences of Bucharest, Romania, after which he became part of the Romanian diplomatic corps.

His most important works are the epic poems of Moscopolea ("Moscopole") and Șana și-ardirea a Gramostil'ei ("Șana and the Burning of Gramos"), written in a mixture of the Gramostean, Farsherot and Pindean dialects of the Aromanian language and with influences from the Romanian poet George Coșbuc. In Moscopolea, he refers to the former metropolis of Moscopole today in Albania, which was mostly Aromanian-inhabited, as the "Third Rome", lamenting its destruction. Velo was also an editor of the Aromanian newspaper Românul de la Pind ("The Romanian of the Pindus"). He died in 1924.
