= Nuși Tulliu =

Aromanian poet and prose writer (1872–1941)

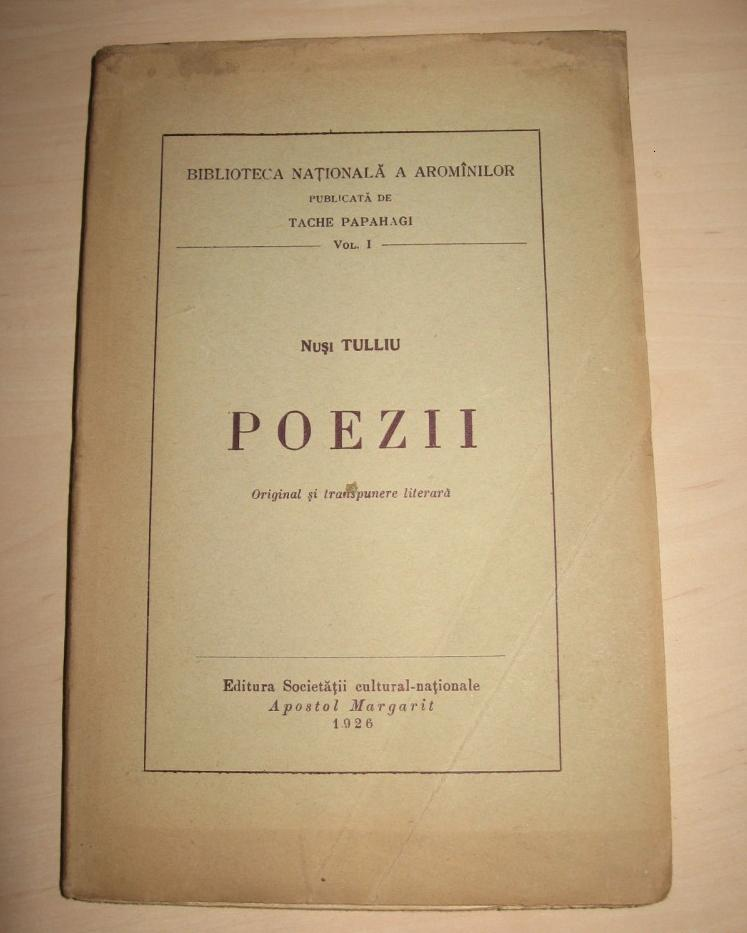
Poezii ("Poems"), collection of poems by Nuși Tulliu published in 1926

Nuși Tulliu (23 April 1872 – 8 April 1941; Aromanian: Nushi Tulliu) was an Aromanian poet and prose writer.

He was born into an Aromanian family in Avdella, a village that formed part of the Ottoman Empire's Manastir Vilayet and is now in Greece. He began school in Kleisoura, followed by the Romanian High School of Bitola. Tulliu then enrolled in the literature faculty at the University of Bucharest in the Romanian Old Kingdom, where he took a degree in Romanian history and language. He attended the law faculty for two years, but did not graduate. In 1905, he was sent to Leipzig University in order to prepare his doctorate in history. While still a student, he taught at the Romanian gymnasium in Ioannina, and then in Romania. From 1929 until his retirement in 1937, he was a teacher in Bucharest. From 1908 to 1912, he was a school inspector in Macedonia.

Tulliu's first published work was an 1894 article in the Bucharest magazine Peninsula balcanică. He subsequently contributed to other Romanian periodicals, including Albumul macedo-român, Cele trei Crișuri, Conservatorul, Dunărea, Flamura, Grai bun, Lilicea Pindului, Ordinea, Propilee literare, Românul de la Pind, Răsăritul, Timpul nou, Țara noastră and Universul. From November 1898 to September 1899, he published Pindul using his own funds; the magazine featured poems and prose in the Aromanian language. He headed Bucharest's Ecoul Macedoniei newspaper, and there published Murmintî fîră cruți (1903), which is described in Dicționarul biografic al literaturii române ("The Biographical Dictionary of Romanian Literature"; 2006), edited by the Romanian literary critic Aurel Sasu, as the only novel in Aromanian-language literature.
