= Marcu Beza =

Romanian writer (1882–1949)

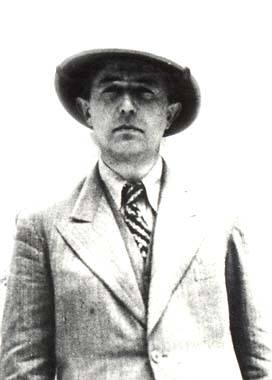
- Marcu Beza
- Born: June 30, 1882; Kleisoura, Ottoman Empire (present-day Greece)
- Died: May 30, 1949 (aged 66); Bucharest, Romania
- Occupations: poet, prose writer, essayist, literary critique, publicist, folklorist, diplomat

Marcu Beza (June 30, 1882 in Kleisoura, Ottoman Empire – May 6, 1949 in Bucharest, Romania) was a Romanian poet, writer, essayist, literary critique, publicist, folklorist, and diplomat of Aromanian origin.

Beza was elected a corresponding member of the Romanian Academy in 1923. He was an editor of the Aromanian newspaper Românul de la Pind.

== Works ==
=== In English ===
- Papers on the Romanian People and Literature, London, 1920
- Zidra. Gardana. The Dead Pool, London – New York, 1921
- Paganism in Romanian Folklore, London, 1928
- Shakespeare in Roumania, London, 1931
- Lands of Many Religions. Palestine, Syria, Cyprus and Mount Sinai, London, 1934
- Origin of the Roumanians, Worcester-London, 1941
- The Roumanian Church, London, 1943
- Heritage of Byzantium, London, 1947

=== In Romanian ===
- De la noi, Bucharest, 1903
- Graiu bun. Calendar aromânesc, Bucharest, 1909
- Pe drumuri. Din viața aromânilor, Bucharest, 1914
- Romantismul englez, Bucharest
- O viață, București, 1921; ediția (Doda), London, 1925
- Din Anglia, însemnările unui literat, Iași, 1923
- Romanul englez contimporan, Bucharest, 1928
- Din alte țări. Studii și impresii, Bucharest, 1933
- Ruva. Între două lumi, Bucharest, 1934
- Biblioteci mănăstirești la Muntele Athos, Bucharest, 1934
- Urme românești în Răsăritul Ortodox, Bucharest, 1935
- Calea destinului, Bucharest, 1938
- Cartea cu amintiri, Bucharest, 1938
- Vechi legături cu Anglia, Bucharest, 1938
- Necunoscuta, Bucharest, 1939
- Romantismul: romanul englez, editor Andi Bălu, Bucharest, 1999
- Pe tărâmuri biblice: Palestina, Siria, Cipru si Muntele Sinai, Bucharest, 2000
