= Ion Foti =

Romanian poet, prose writer, journalist and translator

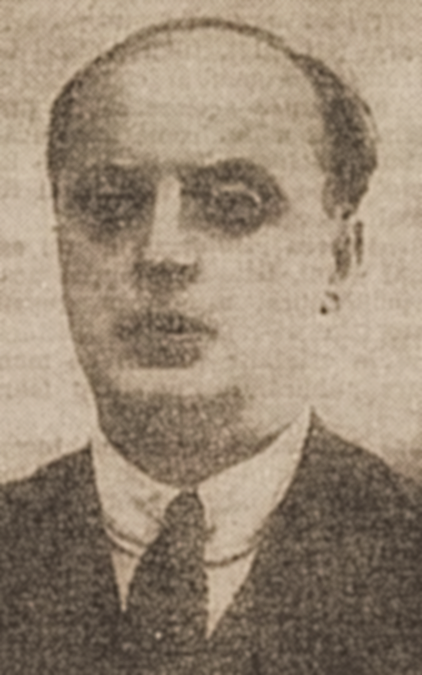
Foti in 1925

Ion Foti (December 11, 1887–1946; Aromanian: Oani Foti) was a Romanian poet, prose writer, journalist, and translator.

He was born into an Aromanian family in Kleisoura, a village that formed part of the Ottoman Empire's Manastir Vilayet and is now in Greece. His father was a trader. After completing high school in Bitola, Foti emigrated to the Romanian Old Kingdom, where he attended the literature and philosophy faculty of the University of Bucharest. His first published work, the Aromanian-language Cântițe si-ndoauă isturii aleapte, appeared in 1912. He was a correspondent for the Athenian newspaper Elefthero Vima, an editor at Bucharest's Viitorul newspaper and, together with Romulus P. Voinescu, co-directed the cultural bimonthly Propilee Literare (1926–1929). Foti's work appeared in Sămănătorul, Luceafărul, Literatorul, Convorbiri Critice, Flacăra, and Universul. He translated Aeschylus, as well as Oriental and German poems into Romanian and Aromanian. In 1925, he won the Romanian Writers' Society prize for poetry.
