= George Murnu =

Romanian poet, translator, archaeologist, and historian

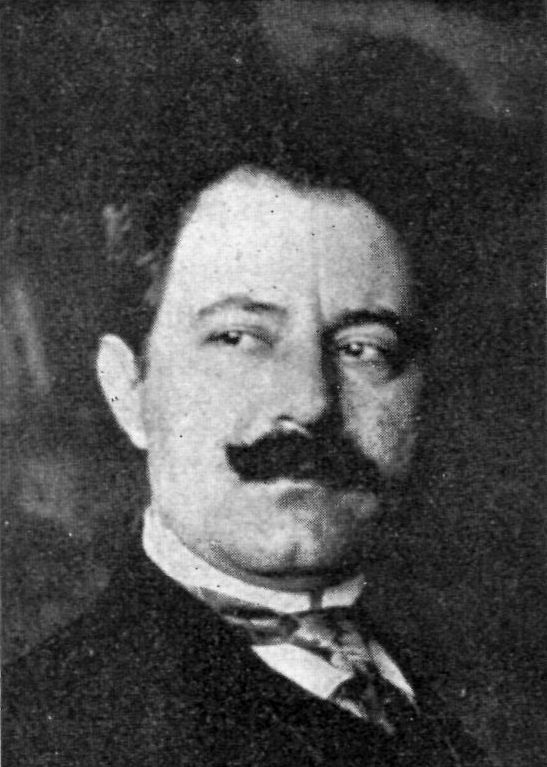
George Murnu

George Murnu (Romanian pronunciation: [ˈdʒe̯ordʒe ˈmurnu]; Aromanian: Ioryi Murnu; 1 January 1868 in Veria, Salonica Vilayet, Ottoman Empire – 17 November 1957 in Bucharest, Romania) was a Romanian university professor, archaeologist, historian, translator, and poet of Aromanian origin.

== Biography ==
After attending the courses of a Romanian primary school in Bitola and the town's Romanian high school, he attended the University of Bucharest. In 1893, at age 25, Murnu was appointed professor at the University of Iași and shortly afterwards was awarded a scholarship by the Romanian State in order to complete his postgraduate studies in Munich, and, after several years he returned to Romania after completing a doctorate in philology. A fruitful scholarly activity followed, culminating in Murnu becoming a chairman professor of archaeology at the University of Bucharest.

In 1909, he was appointed head of the National Archaeological Museum in Bucharest by the Ministry of Public Instruction and Religious Confessions. He has translated an accomplished version of the Odyssey and Iliad into Romanian. He also wrote his own works of poetry (with bucolic themes), both in Romanian and in his native Aromanian language.

Murnu was a sympathizer of the far right Iron Guard, and was an intimate friend of the Aromanian secessionist politician, Alcibiades Diamandi who in 1917 participated in a failed effort to form the independent Samarina Republic under the protection of Italy. After the end of World War II, Murnu was not subject to legal investigation - probably due to his age and prestige.

He was elected a full member of the Romanian Academy. He also was a member of the Macedo-Romanian Cultural Society. Nowadays, a street in the Romanian Black Sea port of Mangalia bears his name.

== Works ==
- Românii din Bulgaria medievală ("Romanians in Medieval Bulgaria")
- Studiu asupra elementului grec ante-fanariot în limba română ("Essay on the pre-Phanariote Greek language elements in Romanian")

== Poetry written by Murnu ==
Cântecul plaiurilor noastre (in Romanian)

Din bură de codri răsună chemare
Din glasuri de păsări, de frunze, de crengi
De șoapte lungi, de fântâni, de izvoare
Cu lacrimi de umbră, cu zâmbet de soare;
Și clopote-aud, cunoscute tălăngi
De turme răzlețe pe văi și pripoare

Grailu armãnescu (Aromanian language).

Grailu-a mel di mumã, grailu-a mel di tatã
Vatra-a mea iu ni-arde anjli tsi-am bãnatã

Grai picurãrescu di pãdhuri shi ploae
Zbor tsi-avdzãi dit gura-a paplui shi ali mae
Zbor di budzã vrutã, dumnidzescã njilã
Anjurizmã di frangã shi di trandafilã.

Lavã di cãshare, boatse di cãlivã
Suflã vindicare-a ta dultse livã.

Adiljat di moscu, duh di primuverã
Bana nj-u cutreamburã ca unã fluiarã
Tsi di dor pitrunde noaptea tu pundie
Inima-nj ti-cãntã, mãna-nj tut ti-scrie.

Stãu, tsi-ascultu plãngu, jalea shi niholu,
Ved ãncrutsiljatã Soia-nj ca Hristolu
Shi mizie li-si-avde zborlu-a tal dit gurã.

Scumpa-a mea fãntãnã tsi anarga curã,
Mãne, poate mãne, di dushmanj biutã,
Va s-armãne tu etã pondã shi tãcutã.

== Sources ==
- Nicolae Șerban Tanașoca, Realism și idealism în "Chestiunea aromânească". Un episod diplomatic din viața lui George Murnu în lumina corespondenței sale inedite (Réalisme et idéalisme dans "la question aroumaine". Un épisode diplomatique de la vie de George Murnu a la lumiere de sa corespondance inédite), in Revista de Istorie, 1997, 8, nr. 11–12, pp. 719–738.
