= Hristu Cândroveanu =

Aromanian editor, literary critic and writer

- Born: 5 February 1928; Babuc, Kingdom of Romania
- Died: 9 December 2013 (aged 85)
- Education: University of Bucharest
- Occupations: Editor, literary critic, poet, prose writer, translator

Hristu Cândroveanu (5 February 1928 – 9 December 2013; Aromanian: Hristu Cãndroveanu) was a Romanian editor, literary critic, poet, prose writer and translator of Aromanian ethnicity. He published several works related to the Aromanians, led several Aromanian magazines and was involved in some Aromanian organizations.

== Biography ==
Hristu Cândroveanu was born on 5 February 1928 in Babuk (Romanian: Babuc), in Durostor County, Romania (now in Silistra Province, Bulgaria). He graduated from the Faculty of Philology at the University of Bucharest on 1952. Following this, he became a Romanian-language teacher for several years in localities of the modern Călărași and Prahova counties as well as in the city of Ploiești.

In 1973, he began his career as a writer with his volume Poeme. Throughout the years, Cândroveanu would publish a multitude of works related to the Aromanians, an ethnic group to which he belonged. During the 80s, he was a literary critic and editor at the magazine Tomis, prestigious in Romanian Dobruja. He also became editor-in-chief of the newspaper Livres roumains ("Romanian Books"), created and directed the Aromanian magazines Deșteptarea ("The Awakening") and Dimândarea ("The Will"), founded in 1992 the Dimândarea Părintească Aromanian Cultural Foundation, and also became president of the Macedo-Romanian Cultural Society. Cândroveanu held the stance that the Aromanians were not an ethnic group of their own, but part of the Romanians. He was critical of the fact that Romania, during the communist regime, had ignored the Aromanian population in the Balkans, which he said had catastrophic consequences for their schools, churches and cultural monuments.

Cândroveanu died on 9 December 2013.

== See also ==
- Aromanians in Romania
