= Aromanians in Romania =

Ethnic Aromanian minority within Romania

Aromanian: Armãnji/rrãmãnji tu Rumãnii Romanian: Aromânii din România

Total population
- 26,500 (2006 estimate)

Regions with significant populations
- Northern Dobruja (Constanța and Tulcea counties)

Languages
- Aromanian (native), Romanian

Religion
- Predominantly Eastern Orthodoxy

Related ethnic groups
- Aromanians

The Aromanians in Romania (Aromanian: armãnji or rrãmãnji; Romanian: aromâni or machedoni) are a non-recognized ethnic minority in Romania that numbered around 26,500 people in 2006. Legally, Romania regards the Aromanians and other groups such as the Megleno-Romanians and the Istro-Romanians as part of the Romanian nation. This is according to a promulgated legislation according to which Romania supports the rights of all those who "assume a Romanian cultural identity, people of Romanian origin and persons that belong to the Romanian linguistic and cultural vein, Romanians who live outside Romania, regardless how they are called". Such is also the stance of the Romanian Academy.

However, some Aromanians have protested against this and have demanded to be recognized as an ethnic minority within Romania. One of the main demands of this community has been to learn their language and culture in Romanian schools. Another has been the creation of a church for the Aromanians functioning in the Aromanian language. In 2020, the Minister of National Education of Romania Monica Anisie announced that the subject "Aromanian culture and civilization" would be introduced in schools as an optional one. Nevertheless, the request of some Aromanians to be declared as an ethnic minority has caused controversy in Romania.

Additionally, in 2021, a proposal to approve the Aromanian National Day as a holiday in the country, to be celebrated every 23 May, was rejected by the Parliament of Romania. Earlier that year, another observance, the Balkan Romanianness Day, was officially adopted to commemorate the establishment of the Ullah millet in the Ottoman Empire in 1905. This day is meant for the Aromanians but also for the Megleno-Romanians and the Istro-Romanians, which are simply considered ethnic Romanians living south of the Danube. The Balkan Romanianness Day is officially celebrated every 10 May.

Some notable Aromanians or people of Aromanian descent in Romania are the professional footballer Gheorghe Hagi and the professional tennis player Simona Halep.

== See also ==
- Aromanians in Albania
- Aromanians in Bulgaria
- Aromanians in Greece
- Aromanians in North Macedonia
- Aromanians in Serbia
- Macedo-Romanian Cultural Society, an Aromanian cultural organization in Romania
