= General Map of Moldavia =

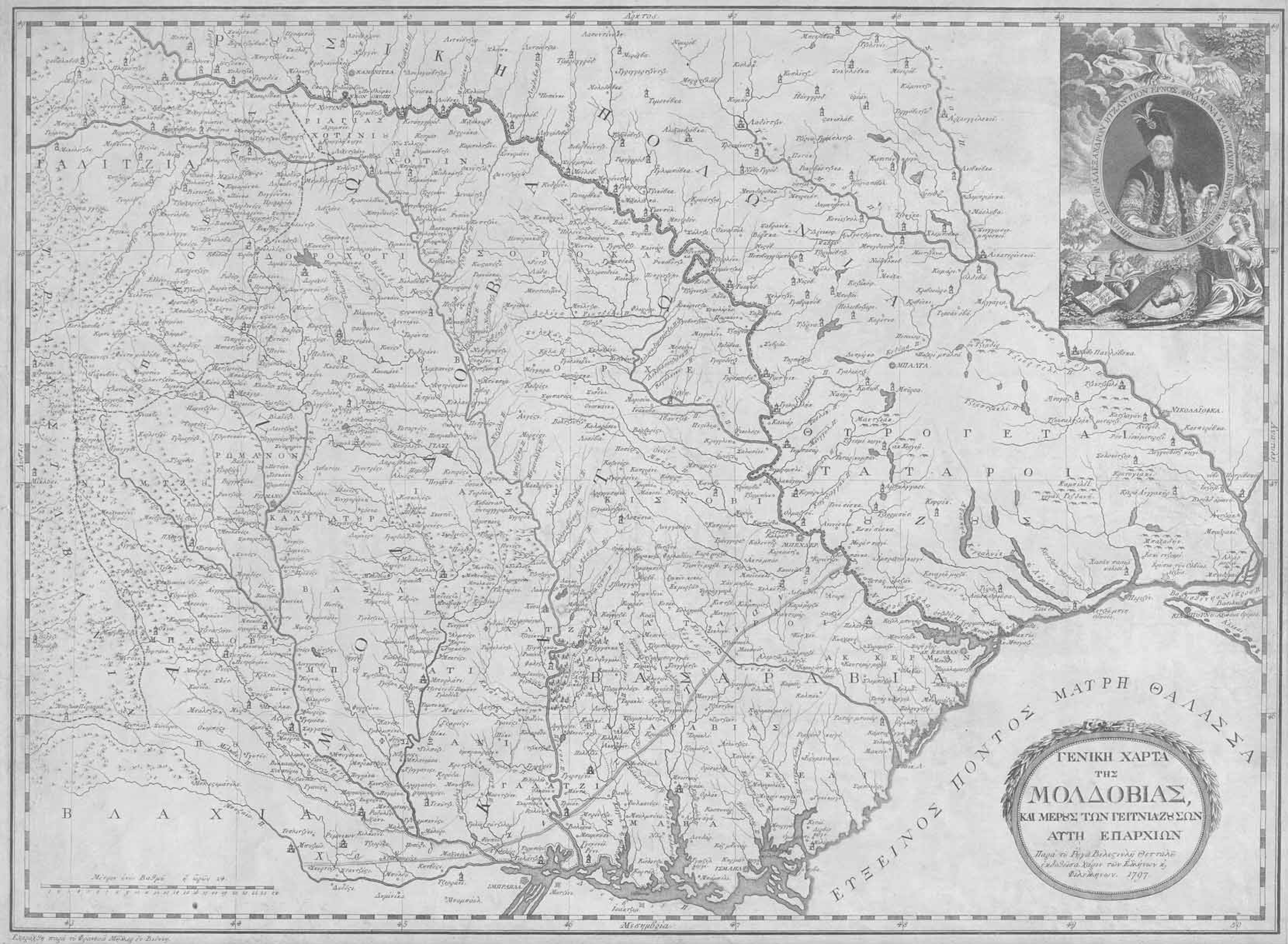
General Map of Moldavia, 1797

The General Map of Moldavia is one of the two maps of the Danubian Principalities which was printed by Rigas Feraios in 1797, the other being the New Map of Wallachia. He printed it in Jacob Nits’ printing press and the engraving was made by Franz Müller. The map is of 82 x 63 cm. in black and white and it is printed on paper from Holland. Its full title is "GENERAL MAP / OF / MOLDAVIA,/ AND PART OF ITS NEIGHBOR PROVINCES/. Published by Rigas Velestinlis from Thessaly for the sake of Greeks and philhellenes, 1797. Engraved by Francois Müller in Vienna". (Greek: «ΓΕΝΙΚΗ ΧΑΡΤΑ/ ΤΗΣ/ ΜΟΛΔΟΒΙΑΣ,/ ΚΑΙ ΜΕΡΟΥΣ ΤΩΝ ΓΕΙΤΝΙΑΖΟΥΣΩΝ/ ΑΥΤΗ ΕΠΑΡΧΙΩΝ/. Παρά του Ρήγα Βελεστινλή Θετταλού εκδοθείσα χάριν των Ελλήνων κ΄ Φιλελλήνων, 1797.Εχαράχθη παρά του Φρανσουά Μήλλερ εν Βιέννη»)

The only surviving copy of the map in the Greek area is kept in the National Historical Museum of Greece. This map together with the Map of Greece (1797), the Pamphlet of Alexander the Great (1797) and the New Map of Wallachia (1797) are the cartographic work of Rigas Velestinlis, showing his national liberation and state vision.

== Description ==
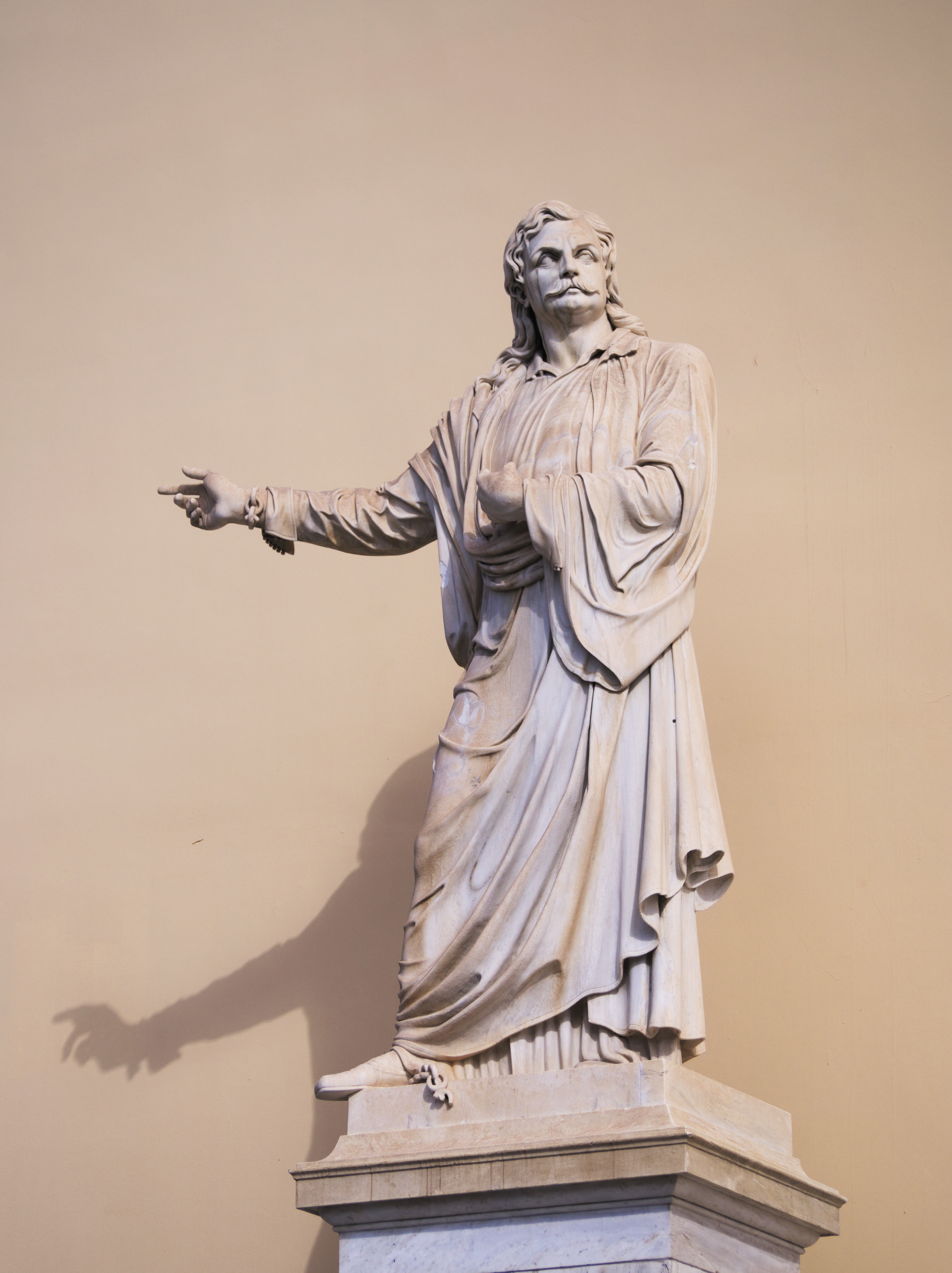
Rigas Feraios, General map's creator.

The map includes Moldova with Crimea and Black Sea as east boundaries, the north part of Wallachia and Bessarabia to the south, Transylvania in the west and Russian Poland to the north. It is highly detailed including place names and symbols, without explanatory memorandum. The borders of Moldavia and Wallachia, Transylvania, Bukovina, Russian Poland and the area Thyrogetai Tatars are defined by a thick dashed line. A thinner dotted line defines the extent of the state of Upper and Lower Moldavia, divided into provinces. The map is surrounded by a cartographic scale, on which the numbers of meridians and parallels are marked, which define each area shown. The four cardinal points Arktos – Mesimbria – West and East are also marked. On the lower left part of the Map, within the margin, the writing "Measure of one degree or 24 hours" (Greek: «Μέτρον ενός βαθμού ή ωρών 24») explains the time scale used for the design of the Map, which is estimated to range around the ratio of 1:600000.

The Map is dedicated to Alexandru Callimachi, ruler of Moldavia. His portrait is depicted in the upper right corner together with compositions and Moldovan state symbols together with the ancient inscription in Greek: «ΗΠΙΟΝ ΩΔ’ ΟΡ’ ΑΛΕΞΑΝΔΡΟΝ ΒΥΖΑΝΤΙΟΝ ΕΡΝΟΣ- ΦΡΑΔΜΟΝΑ ΚΑΛΛΙΜΑΧΗΝ ΚΡΑΝΤΟΡΑ ΜΟΛΔΟΒΙΗΣ», which means "Watch the gentle Alexandru, the child of Byzantium, the wise Callimachi, ruler of Moldova".

== Archetype of the map ==
The archetype of Moldova General Map is considered to be the work of the Austrian cartographer H. Schultz, "Neueste Karte von der Moldau, Walachei, Bessarabien und der Krim sambt der angraenzenden Provinzen Siebenburgen, Bukovina, einem grossen Theil von Ungarn, Galizien, Polen, Tartarei, Neurussland und Bulgarien, nach den besten Original-zeichnungen und Karten von General Bauer und H. J. F. Schmid, entworfen von H.C. Schutz und gestochen von F. Muller" (translation: "The latest map of Moldavia, Wallachia, Bessarabia and the Crimea and the neighboring provinces of Siebenburgen, Bukovina, a large part of Hungary, Galicia, Poland, Tartaria, New Russia and Bulgaria, based on the best original drawings and maps by General Bauer and HJF Schmid, designed by HC Protection and engraved by F. Muller"). This map was published around 1787 in Vienna from the same engraver. Rigas in his own version added some city or sites names which were mainly known by the Greeks of the Diaspora.

== Objectives of the publication – interpretation ==
According to his apology during his interrogation when he was arrested by the Austrian police, Rigas printed the maps of the Danubian Principalities for commercial purposes. Despite his assertion that he published the Maps of Paristrion with “speculation” as his sole aim, it seems that he did not choose randomly the mapping of the two semi-autonomous regions of the Balkans, which during the Ottoman rule had become Greek educational centers. He knew very well the two principalities since he lived for some time in Wallachia . Specifically during the period from 1791 up to 1796 he was preparing his literary and cartographic work. Through his publications he aimed at spiritual awakening of the enslaved people of the Balkans, something which is also indicated in his phrase “For the sake of the Greeks and the philhellenes” (Greek: "Χάριν των Ελλήνων και Φιλλελλήνων").

== Impact of the publication ==
The publication of the two maps of the Danubian Principalities received widespread support by the Greek press of Vienna. On 16 March 1797 an advertisement was published in the newspaper Efimeris, which was published by the Markides Pouliou brothers in Vienna, and it was addressed to the subscribers who would like to acquire the maps. In the same newspaper on 16 June 1797 the advertisement for the publication of the General Map of Moldova was filed. Extensive reference for the issue of the map and its description was made by scholars of the time of Rigas such as F.K. Alter and Johann Christian von Engel belonging to philhellenes’ circles of Vienna and were closely connected with the Greeks of the Diaspora.

The Map of Moldova and the New Map of Wallachia were not released in the Danubian Principalities since shortly after their release, Rigas was arrested and all copies were confiscated, making them unique and very hard to find today. Compared with the Map of Greece, they do not show the same scientific and national value. However they have enlightening and pedagogical significance for the Greeks of their time, they are product of a great personality and they are a valuable source for anyone wishes to study about the Ottoman Rule.

== See also ==
- New Map of Wallachia and part of Transylvania

== Bibliography ==
- Amandos, K. [Άμαντος, Κ.], Ανέκδοτα έγγραφα περί Ρήγα Βελεστινλή. Σύλλογος προς Διάδοσιν Ωφελίμων Βιβλίων. Ιστορική και Λαογραφική Βιβλιοθήκη Αρ. 7. Αθήνα, 1930.
- Alter, F.K., Philologisch-kritish Miscellaneen, Βιέννη, εκδ. Τράττνερ 1799.
- Vranousis, L. I. [Βρανούσης, Λ. Ι.], Ρήγας. Έρευνα, συναγωγή και μελέτη. Αθήναι, Βασική Βιβλιοθήκη -10
- Daskalakis, Ap. V. [Δασκαλάκης, Απ. Β.], Les oeuvres de Rhigas Velestinlis, Παρίσι 1936, και Ο Ρήγας Βελεστινλής ως διδάσκαλος του Γένους, Αθήναι ,1977
- Daskalakis, Ap. V. [Δασκαλάκης, Απ. Β.], Ο Ρήγας Βελεστινλής ως Διδάσκαλος του Γένους. ΄Εκδοσις νέα μετά συμπληρώσεων και προσθηκών. Αθήνα, 1977.
- Engel, Johann Kristian von, Geschichte des Ungrischen Reichs und seiner Nebenländer. – t.IV: Geschichte der Moldau und Walachey, nebst der historischen und statischen Literatur beyder Lander, Erster Theil, Halle, 1804.
- Enepekidis, Pol. [Ενεπεκίδης, Πολ.], Ρήγας – Υψηλάντης – Καποδίστριας. Έρευνα εις τα Αρχεία της Αυστρίας, Γερμανίας, Ιταλίας, Γαλλίας και Ελλάδος, Αθήνα, 1965.
- Kamarianos, N. [Καμαριάνος, Ν.], Ρήγας Βελεστινλής, Συμπληρώσεις και διορθώσεις για τη ζωή και το έργο του. Εισαγωγή – Μετάφραση – σχόλια Αθ. Καραθανάσης, Επιστημονική Εταιρεία Μελέτης Φερών – Βελεστίνου-Ρήγα, Αθήνα 1999.
- Karamberopoulos, D. [Καραμπερόπουλος, Δ.], Οι Χάρτες Βλαχίας και Μολδαβίας του Ρήγα Βελεστινλή. Βιέννη 1797. Νέα στοιχεία – Ευρετήριο- Αυθεντική Επανέκδοση. Αθήνα, Επιστημονική Εταιρεία Μελέτης Φερών – Βελεστίνου- Ρήγα. 2005.
- Dimitra Koukiou [Δήμητρα Κουκίου], "Η Γενική Χάρτα της Μολδαβίας και μέρους των γειτνιαζουσών αυτή επαρχιών. Παρά του Ρήγα Βελεστινλή Θετταλού εκδοθείσα χάριν των Ελλήνων κ΄ Φιλελλήνων, 1797.", Τεκμήρια Ιστορίας-Μονογραφίες, Αθήνα, 2009.
- Legrand Émile, [Λεγκράντ Αιμ.], Ανέκδοτα έγγραφα περί Ρήγα Βελεστινλή και των συν αυτώ μαρτυρησάντων. Εκ των εν Βιέννη αρχείων εξαχθέντα και δημοσιευθέντα υπό Αιμιλίου Λεγράνδ. Μετά μεταφράσεως ελληνικής υπό Σπυρίδωνος Λάμπρου. Αθήνησιν, 1891.
- Livieratos, Ef. [Λιβιεράτος, Ευ.], Χαρτογραφίας και χαρτών Περιήγησις. 25 Αιώνες από τους Ίωνες στον Πτολεμαίο και τον Ρήγα. Αθήνα, Εθνική Χαρτοθήκη, 1998.
- Laios, G. [Λάιος, Γ.], Οι χάρτες του Ρήγα, Αθήνα, ΔΙΕΕ, 1960.
- Sturza, Mihail-Dimitri, Dictionnaire Historique et Genealogique des Grandes Familles de Grece d’ Albanie et de Constantinople, Paris, 1983.
- Fotinos, D. [Φωτεινός, Δ.], Ιστορία της πάλαι Δακίας, τα νυν Τρανσιλβανίας, Βλαχίας, και Μολδαυϊας. Εκ διαφόρων παλαιών και νεωτέρων συγγραφέων συνερανισθείσα…., τόμοι Α και Β. Εν Βιέννη της Αουστρίας, εκ του Τυπογραφείου Ιω. Βαρθολ. Σβεκίου, 1818.
- Exhibition catalogue: Ρήγα Βελεστινλή. Έκθεση αφιερωμένη στα 200 χρόνια από το θάνατό του, Αθήνα, Εθνικό Ιστορικό Μουσείο, 1998. (κατάλογος έκθεσης).
- Παγκόσμιο Βιογραφικό Λεξικό, Αθήνα, Εκδοτική Αθηνών, 1985.
- Μεγάλη Ελληνική Εγκυκλοπαίδεια, Αθήνα, Π. Δρανδάκη, Φοίνιξ, χ.χρ.
