= Pamphlet of Rigas Feraios =

1797 chalcography by Rigas Feraios

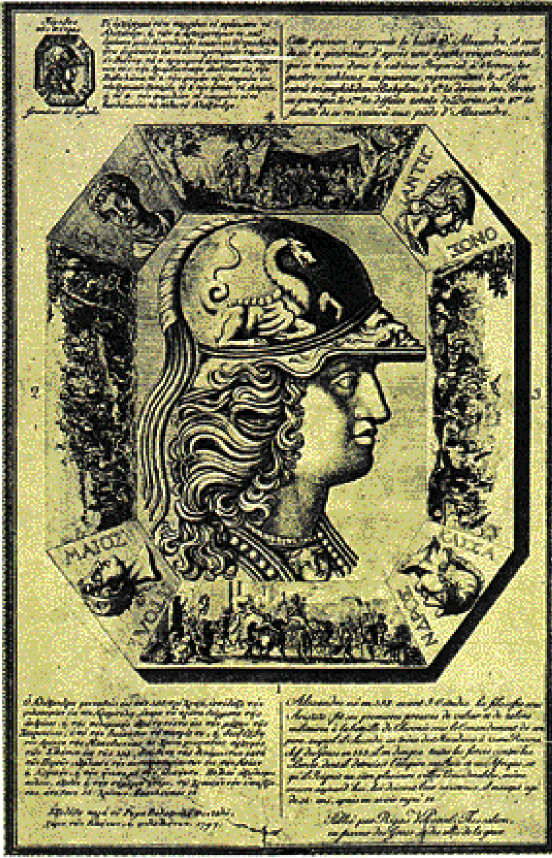
Rigas' pamphlet

The Pamphlet of Rigas Feraios is a large chalcography (45 × 29 cm) printed in Vienna in 1797 by Rigas Feraios. It depicts a portrait of Alexander the Great framed by war scenes and portraits of his generals. The etching was incised by François Müller, who cooperated with Rigas for his cartographic work which he published the same year: Rigas' Map of Greece (1797), the New Map of Wallachia and part of Transylvania (1797) and the General Map of Moldavia (1797). It was released in 1200 copies from the printing press of Nitsch. One of the two copies that have been discovered in Greece is displayed in the National Historical Museum of Greece.

== Description ==
The pamphlet is divided into two parts: the figurative and the explanatory. The iconographic representation occupies the largest part of the picture, while she is repeated in reduction in the left corner. The head of Alexander the Great (his identity is given in the explanatory) prevails in the center. He has long hair, wears a helmet decorated with winged dragon tail to the side and human face at the cornice, while the breastplate is decorated with a human figure. The portrait is surrounded by an octagonal frame and is divided in 8 unequal trapezoidal panels. In the four smaller ones, the heads of his most notable generals are illustrated and their names are written in capital letters: Seleucus, Antigonus, Cassander and Ptolemy. In the larger horizontal panels, four multifaceted scenes are pictured from the expedition against the Persians: 1. The triumphal entry of Alexander into Babylon, 2. The fleeing of Persians at Granicus River, 3. The defeat of Darius, 4. The family of the defeated king at the feet of Alexander.

The explanatory text is bilingual (Greek and French) and written in two columns. It is also divided in 3 sections which are distinguished by 3 separate paragraphs at the upper part of the page. The first section is referred to the subject of the picture and the sources that its creator has used. The second section is referred to the personality of Alexander with a short and comprehensive biographical text. The third section is the colophon and declares the creator of the picture and the aim of the publication.

== Archetype ==
The existence of the ancient seal which was used as an archetype, as Rigas mentions in the explanatory text, is not disputed but it has been proved that he copies with some variations, an etching that he detected during his stay in Vienna. It is about the picture that the engraver Salomon Kleiner created and Joseph de France (general director of the imperial treasury of the imperial gallery and the monetary collections) published in 1749 in Vienna. The two etchings show great similarities in the portraits of Alexander the Great and his generals, while Rigas adds to the explanatory text historical information for the action of Alexander. The rest of the scenes are different because their copy was difficult due to their complex composition. Archetypes of these two etchings are the paintings of the French painter Charles Le Brun, whose copy was quite popular in Europe during 17th and 18th century.

== Rigas' goals and the pamphlet's interpretation ==
As Rigas stated to the Austrian authorities, the publication of the pamphlet aimed to the awakening of Greek's national consciousness. The historical information that he quotes, aim to the national uplift of the enslaved and to the connection with the glorious ancient past, just like the rest of Riga's publications. The short and comprehensive biography of Alexander makes him a legendary hero who survived through the centuries and became an example to follow. Through his legendary accomplishments becomes the timeless symbol of national liberation in Modern Greek consciousness. The Ottoman conquerors are identified with the Persians who should be repelled same way as the Macedonian king did. Rigas published this portrait for one more reason which is detected to the colophon of the picture. The phrase "for the Greeks and the Philhellenes" makes it clear that the enslaved Greeks must rise up and claim their independence, mainly counting on the help of France, since during this period the Great Napoleon promises the liberation of the Greeks.

== Impact and effects of the pamphlet ==
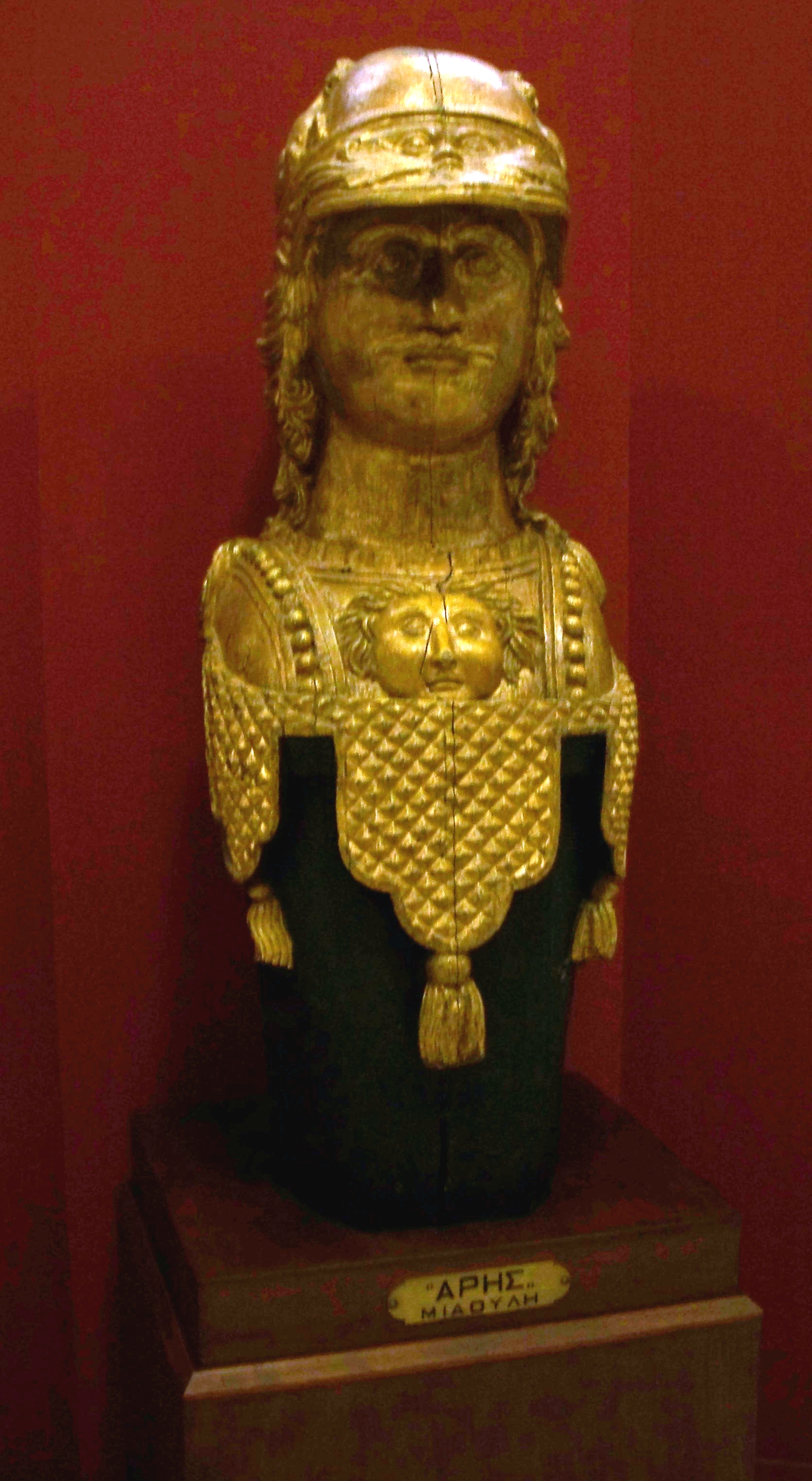
Figurehead of Miaoulis' Aris, 1816

The pamphlet accomplished the establishment of the portrait of Alexander the Great as the "authentic" hero pattern. Until the late 19th century, this portrait is often repeated with some variations, while its spread contributed to the creation of the idealized warrior hero pattern. The pamphlet is repeated as frontispiece to the version of Arrian's "Sozomena", which was edited by Neophytos Doukas and was published in 1809 in Vienna. In 1816 the figure of Alexander the Great, as Rigas Velestinlis designed it, adorned the figurehead on Andreas Miaoulis ship, Aris (Mars).

After the Greek Revolution the figure of Alexander the Great was the inspiration to artists or writers who wanted to stimulate the self-knowledge of the Greeks with their works. A good example is the release of an etching in 1849 in Athens which was created by the lithographer Ioannis Koronaios.

The pamphlet of Alexander the Great and all the following allegoric pictures intended to the awakening of the Greek consciousness and they can be included in the large category of images of national purpose. This name was established on the occasion of the national purpose paintings that were released in 1940 from the School of Fine Arts for the national resistance against the Italian and later the German troops.

== Bibliography ==
- Amantos, K., Ανέκδοτα έγγραφα περί Ρήγα Βελεστινλή. Σύλλογος προς Διάδοσιν Ωφελίμων Βιβλίων. Historical and Folklore Library, No. 7. Athens, 1930.
- Daskalakis, Ap., Les oeuvres de Rhigas Velestinlis, Paris 1936,
- Daskalakis, V., Ο Ρήγας Βελεστινλής ως Διδάσκαλος του Γένους. ΄Εκδοσις νέα μετά συμπληρώσεων και προσθηκών. Athens, 1977.
- Gratziou Olga, «Το Μονόφυλλο του Ρήγα του 1797. Παρατηρήσεις στη νεοελληνική εικονογραφία του Μεγάλου Αλεξάνδρου», Μνήμων, Athens, 1980.
- Kamarianos, N., Ρήγας Βελεστινλής, Συμπληρώσεις και διορθώσεις για τη ζωή και το έργο του. Introduction – Translation – Commentary Ath. Karathanasis, Επιστημονική Εταιρεία Μελέτης Φερών – Βελεστίνου-Ρήγα, Athens 1999.
- Koukiou-Mitropoulou, Dimitra, «Ο Μέγας Αλέξανδρος του Ρήγα. Προπομπός των εικόνων εθνικής σκοπιμότητος προς ενίσχυση του Λαϊκού φρονήματος», newspaper "Η Καθημερινή", Επτά Ημέρες, May 17, 1998.
- Koukiou-Mitropoulou, Dimitra, «Μια εικόνα του Μεγάλου Αλεξάνδρου φιλοτεχνημένη το 1849 στην Αθήνα από τον Ιωάννη Κορωναίο», Τεκμήρια Ιστορίας. Μονογραφίες, Athens, 2015.
- Laios, G., Οι χάρτες του Ρήγα, Αθήνα, ΔΙΕΕ, 1960.
- Legrand Em., Ανέκδοτα έγγραφα περί Ρήγα Βελεστινλή και των συν αυτώ μαρτυρησάντων. Εκ των εν Βιέννη αρχείων εξαχθέντα και δημοσιευθέντα υπό Αιμιλίου Λεγράνδ. Μετά μεταφράσεως ελληνικής υπό Σπυρίδωνος Λάμπρου. Athens, 1891.
- Vranousis, L. I., Ρήγας. Έρευνα, συναγωγή και μελέτη. Athens, Βασική Βιβλιοθήκη -10.
- Μεγάλη Ελληνική Εγκυκλοπαίδεια, Athens, Π. Δρανδάκη, Φοίνιξ, χ.χρ.
- Παγκόσμιο Βιογραφικό Λεξικό, Athens, Εκδοτική Αθηνών, 1985.
- Ρήγα Βελεστινλή. Έκθεση αφιερωμένη στα 200 χρόνια από το θάνατό του, Athens, National Historical Museum, 1998. (exhibition catalogue).
- Το όραμα του Ρήγα. Ο Ρήγας στις Παραδουνάβιες Ηγεμονίες. Exhibition catalogue. Athens, 1998.
