= Kalaras =

Kalaras is a surname. Notable people with the surname include:

- Efthymios Kalaras
- George Kalaras
