= Hellenic Nomarchy =

Book by an Anonymous Greek

Hellenic Nomarchy: a Discourse on Freedom
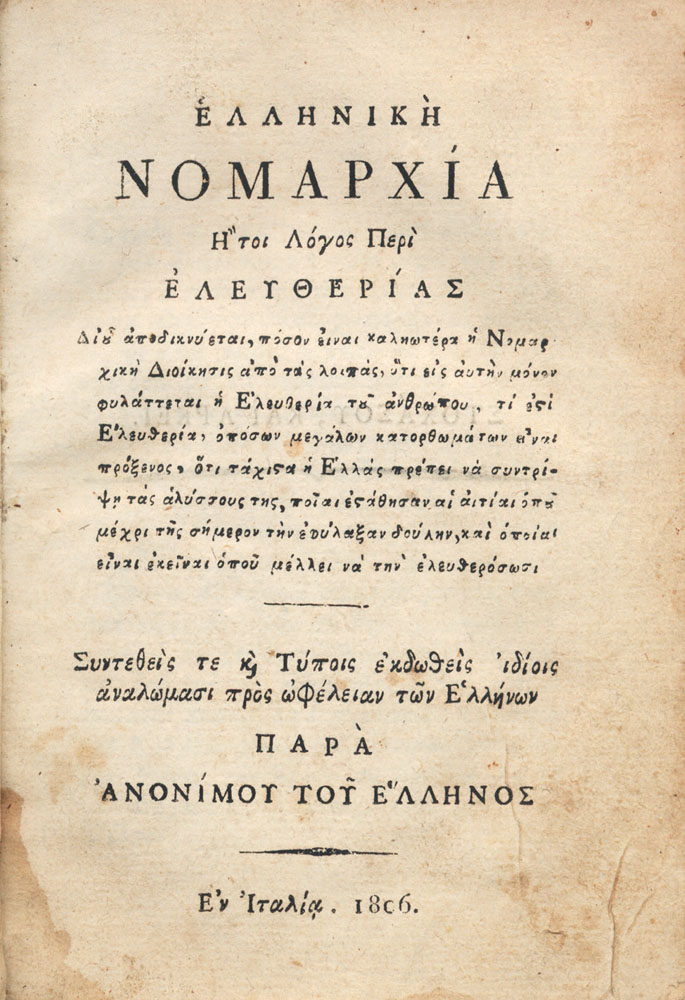
- Cover
- Author: Anonymous Greek
- Original title: Ελληνική Νομαρχία: ήτοι Λόγος περί Ελευθερίας
- Language: Greek
- Subject: Revolution, Freedom, Politics
- Genre: Pamphlet
- Publication date: 1806
- Original text: Ελληνική Νομαρχία: ήτοι Λόγος περί Ελευθερίας at Greek Wikisource

Hellenic Nomarchy (Greek: Ελληνική Νομαρχία The Greek rule of law) was a pamphlet written by "an Anonymous Greek" published and printed in Italy in 1806. It advocated the ideals of freedom, social justice and social equality as the main principles of a well-governed society, making it the most important theoretical monument of Greek republicanism. Its author, arguing for both social autonomy and national sovereignty, supported the Greek struggle for national liberation and turned to the moral greatness of ancient Greece in order to stimulate collective pride. Although this work was widely read by Greeks before the outbreak of the Greek War of Independence in 1821, from its first appearance it was received with discomfort by its contemporary audience, and later generated scholarly debates on the identity of its author.

== Background ==
The origins of modern Greek republican thought can be traced in the works of Iosipos Moisiodax, a major representative of the modern Greek Enlightenment, especially in his work Apology (Greek: Απολογία, 1780). Further development of republican thought in Greek culture was stimulated by French Revolutionary ideas.

An articulate expression of Greek republicanism can be found in the works of the revolutionary author Rigas Feraios. Feraios' execution in 1798 at the hands of the Ottomans gave an aura of heroism to these political ideas, which also visualized the liberation of Greece in the context of political reforms. In addition to Feraios' writings, other works in the same polemical style took on a sharper revolutionary character, as social contradictions in the Ottoman Empire grew.

It was in this context that the most important theoretical monument of Greek republicanism, Hellenic Nomarchy, was written. This work, an anonymous tract, was published somewhere in Italy in 1806, under the full title: Hellenic Nomarchy: a Discourse on Freedom (Greek: Ελληνική Νομαρχία: 'Ητοι Λόγος περί Ελευθερίας). The author was perhaps a merchant who lived in Livorno or Venice, in northern Italy, styling himself Anonymous Hellene. Several personalities of that time have been suggested, such as Adamantios Korais, Pashalis Donas, Christophoros Perraivos and George Kalaras. However, the author's identity was so well-concealed that even repeated scholarly investigations in recent decades have proven unable to attribute the work.

== Content ==
Hellenic Nomarchy proclaims that society must be governed by laws established by common agreement of the people and that the establishment and preservation of liberty requires a Nomarchic form of government. Although this term was uncommon in the Greek literature of that time, it is used as an alternative term of democracy. The intent of Hellenic Nomarchy was to show that the sole power and authority of the "law" (Greek: Νόμος, romanized: Nomos) could only be established through democracy. In this spirit, the author was following the principles stressed by ancient Greek literature and philosophy concerning the subject. The work also argues that Greeks should not have any leader other than their own laws. This principle follows from the works of Rigas Feraios, who stressed in his Revolutionary Manifesto, some years before, that law is the supreme master of men. Feraios also praised democracy as the most successful system of government.

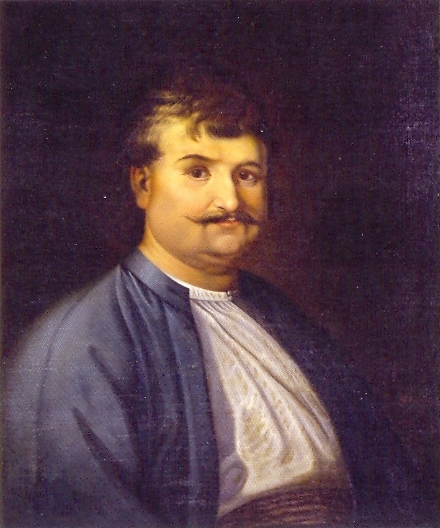
"Hellas will always pay tribute to your immortal name, counting it among those of Epaminondas, Leonidas, Themistocles and Thrasybulus." – from Hellenic Nomarchy, regarding Rigas Ferraios (pictured)

The anonymous author dedicates his work to the activist and author Rigas Feraios and condemns the feudal behavior of the Greek clergy. Moreover, he advocates the transition to a new economic structure based upon small agricultural producers and craftsmen. By applying the physiocratic principles, he argued that peasants were society's backbone, or as he put it, "the column of society". However, the author argued that because of number of external factors, such as feudalism and state intervention, they had a very low living standard. The main references in the book are to the ancient Greek philosophical works, although the influence of contemporary European thinkers such as Jean-Jacques Rousseau, Montesquieu, and Voltaire is obvious in the author's endeavor to describe a "fair and humane" society. On the other hand, when it comes to the struggle for national liberation he turns to the moral greatness of ancient Greece in order to stimulate collective pride and to describe models of heroism and patriotism:

So, the great Leonidas, having found himself with two thousand troops in the straits of Thermopylae, and having seen the multitude of his Persian enemies drawing near, immediately decided to sacrifice himself for the salvation of his fatherland Hellas. He thus chose only three hundred Spartans and turned the others back.

Moreover, Hellenic Nomarchy points to the ongoing successful struggle of the Serbs against the Ottoman rule, which began in 1804. The author states that the Orthodox clergy was holding back the national aspirations of the Greek people, while the educated and dynamic elements of Greek society and the mercantile diaspora should return to Greece and join the movement of national liberation.

== Popularity ==
Hellenic Nomarchy was widely read during the late Ottoman rule among Greeks, and propagated the ideals of freedom, social justice and equality as the main principles of every well-governed society. However, since its first appearance it remained an enigmatic work, received with discomfort by some contemporaries, shrouded in silence during the 19th and the early 20th centuries, and later causing debate about the identity of the author. A number of modern Greek historians describe the work as "perhaps the most important treatise of the political thought of the Neohellenic Enlightenment", "the most important theoretical monument of [modern] Greek republicanism", as well as "the most articulate declaration of social and political discontent before the War of Independence".

== Sources ==
- Eliopoulos, Nicholas (2009). "Liberty in the Hellenic Nomarchy of 1806". The Historical Review/La Revue Historique. 6: 1. Archived from the original on 23 July 2011.
- Karayiannis, Anastassios D.; Ithakissios, Dionyssios D. (1999). "Hellenic Nomarchy: A Discourse on Freedom: An Early 19th Century Greek Humanist Treatise" (PDF). Storia Delpensiero Economico. 38. University of Piraeus: 137–144.
- Kitromilides, Paschalis M. (2011). "From Republican Patriotism to National Sentiment: A Reading of Hellenic Nomarchy". European Journal of Political Theory. 5 (1). University of Piraeus: 50–60. doi:10.1177/1474885106059064. hdl:10442/8671. ISSN 1474-8851. S2CID 55444918.
