= Serbskija novini =

- Founded: 1791
- Language: Serbian
- Headquarters: Vienna

Serbskija novini was the first Serbian-language newspaper. It was published in Vienna in 1791 by the Markides Pouliou brothers.

The initiative to publish Serbian newspaper was announced by ethnic Greek Dimitrije Teoharidis on 10 May 1788, followed by brothers Georgije and Publije Markides Puljo on 14 June of the same year. In 1790 Emanuilo Janković wanted to achieve permission to publish the newspaper in Novi Sad which he achieved when the Grand Folk Assembly in Timisoara granted him permission and a loan on 2 October 1790. His initiative was however halted by the royal delegate who stated that there is in fact nothing preventing earlier permission request by brothers Markides Puljo who wanted to publish their newspaper in Vienna.

In October of 1790 they established both Serbian newspaper and Greek newspaper Efimeris. The first issue of the Serbian newspaper was published on 14 March 1791 (Julian calendar). There is no data on newspaper contributors but it is believed that the correspondent from Osijek was Stefan Rajić. The newspaper followed the style of the other newspapers in the city and they published first Serbian reportages, book reviews and adds.

The permission to publish the newspaper was discontinued in 1792 due to editorial sympathies for the French Revolution. The published issues were retraced from public libraries and most probably destroyed remaining mostly forgotten until 1901 when Matica srpska rediscovered and acquired one complete of publication (missing late 1792 issues).
