= Markides Pouliou brothers =

Typographer brothers in the Habsburg monarchy

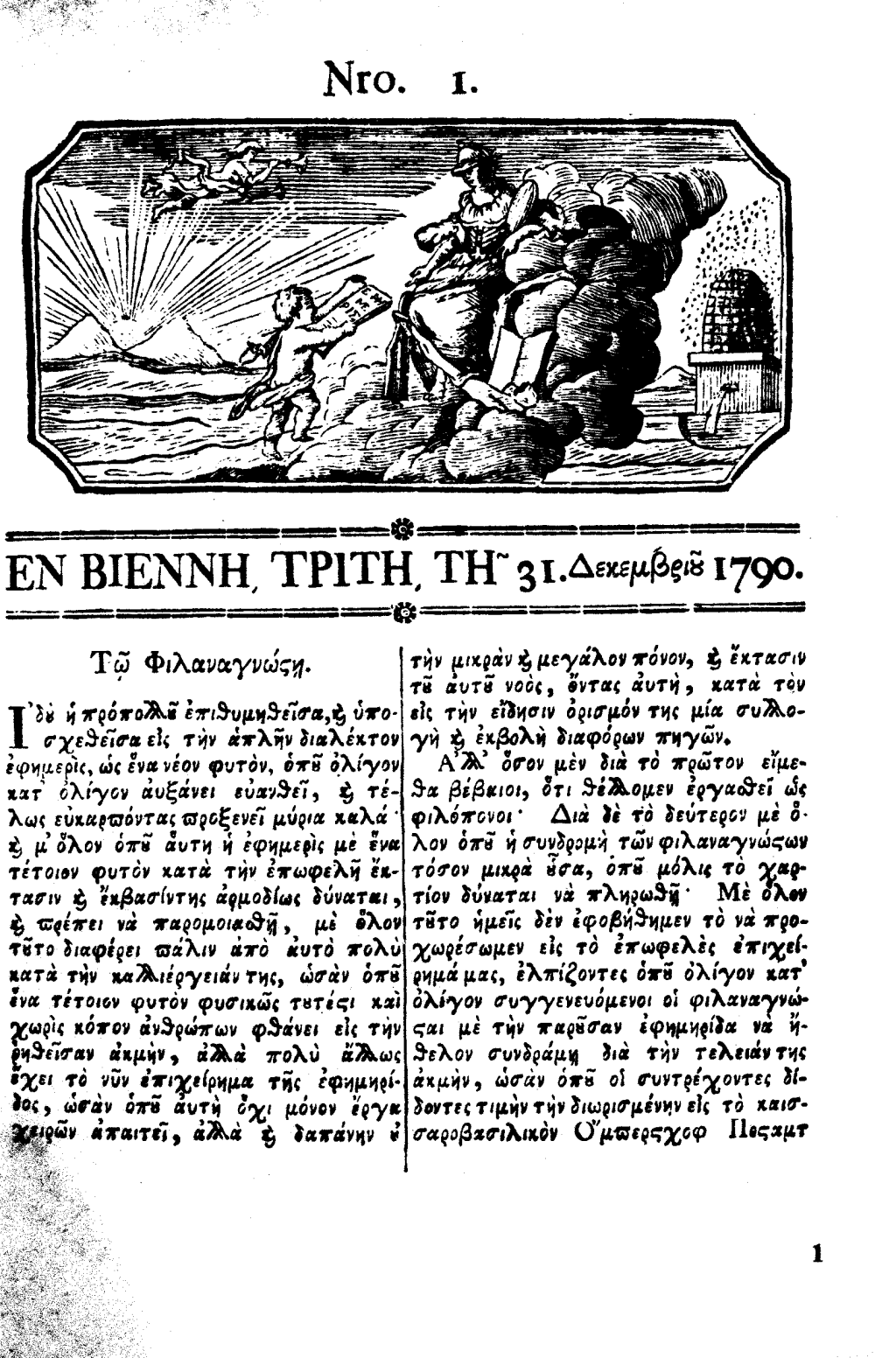
Title page of the first issue of Efimeris, published on 31 December 1790 by the Markides Pouliou brothers

The Markides Pouliou brothers (also Markides Poulios, Markidis Pouliou, Markidis Poulios or Marcu Puiu; Greek: Αδερφοί Μαρκίδες Πούλιου, Μαρκίδης Πούλιου or Μαρκίδης Πούλιος), Georgios and Poulios (also Poublios; Greek: Γεώργιος and Πούλιος or Πούπλιος), were two typographers in the Habsburg monarchy. They were ethnic Aromanians and were the sons of a merchant from Siatista (then in the Ottoman Empire and now in Greece), with them having also been merchants themselves.

The Markides Pouliou brothers worked for Joseph von Baumeister, an Austrian lawyer who founded a printing house at his office in Vienna. On 31 December 1790, the brothers published the first issue of Efimeris, the oldest Greek-language newspaper of which copies are still preserved. After Baumeister was appointed teacher at the Austrian Royal Court in 1792, the Markides Pouliou took the direction of his printing house. During the following years, the brothers continued the publication of Efimeris and obtained Austrian citizenship.

In October 1797, the printing house of the Markides Pouliou published 3,000 copies of a manifesto written by the revolutionary Rigas Feraios. It contained a declaration of the rights of man, a Greek constitution, a proclamation and a call to arms to the Balkan Christians to fight for their freedom against Ottoman rule. In December 1797, Feraios was assassinated by order of the Austrian authorities. The Markides Pouliou brothers were accused with having helped Feraios spread his revolutionary message, and in February 1798, their printing house was closed and they were expelled from the domains of the Habsburg monarchy, with them being left alive because they were Austrian citizens. The last issue of Efimeris was thus published in 1797.

Apart from Efimeris, the first Serbian-language newspaper Serbskija novini and the first Aromanian-language primer written by Posen-based Aromanian protopope Constantin Ucuta were also published in the publishing house of the Markides Pouliou brothers.
