= Nebojša Tower =

Medieval tower in Belgrade, Serbia

Coordinates: 44.827365°N 20.447883°E

Nebojša Tower (Serbian: Кула Небојша, romanized: Kula Nebojša; Greek: Πύργος Νεμπόισα) is the only surviving medieval tower of the Belgrade Fortress. Built in the 15th century, it was the major defensive tower of the fortress for centuries. Later it served as a dungeon and in 2010 it was adapted into a museum. The tower is located near the confluence of the Sava into the Danube.

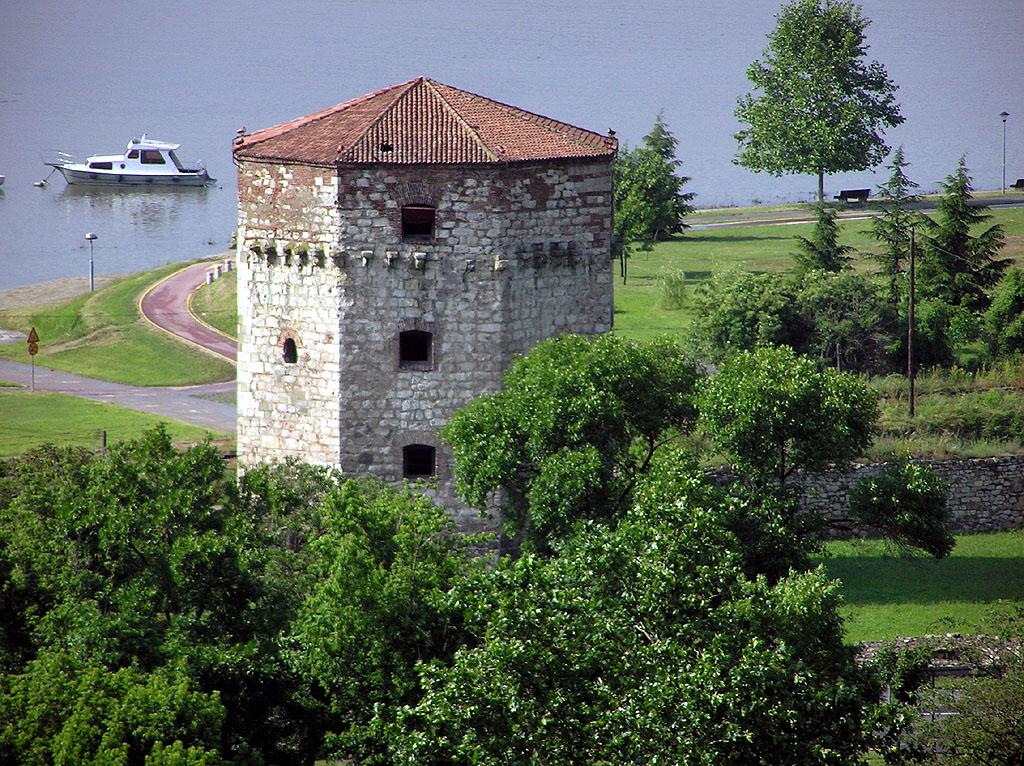
Nebojša Tower, view from the Belgrade Fortress

== History ==
=== Name ===
The name of the tower, nebojša, means "fearless" in Serbian. In medieval Serbia it was a common name of the tower which was most forward from the fortress. The custom of naming the towers this way can be found among other Slavic people, like Slovaks. In modern Serbia, Nebojša became a common male name, so people began to occasionally call it Nebojša's Tower (Serbian: Небојшина кула, romanized: Nebojšina kula), as if it's being named after someone named Nebojša, which is incorrect. As a common noun, nebojša is sometimes used as a Serbian translation for the daredevil.

The tower was originally called the "White tower" (Serbian: Бела кула, romanized: Bela kula) and is mentioned under this name in 1572. Later, it was named "Timișoara Tower" (Serbian: Темишварска кула, romanized: Temišvarska kula) and after the original Nebojša Tower was destroyed in 1690, the name was transferred to the present tower.

=== Predecessor ===
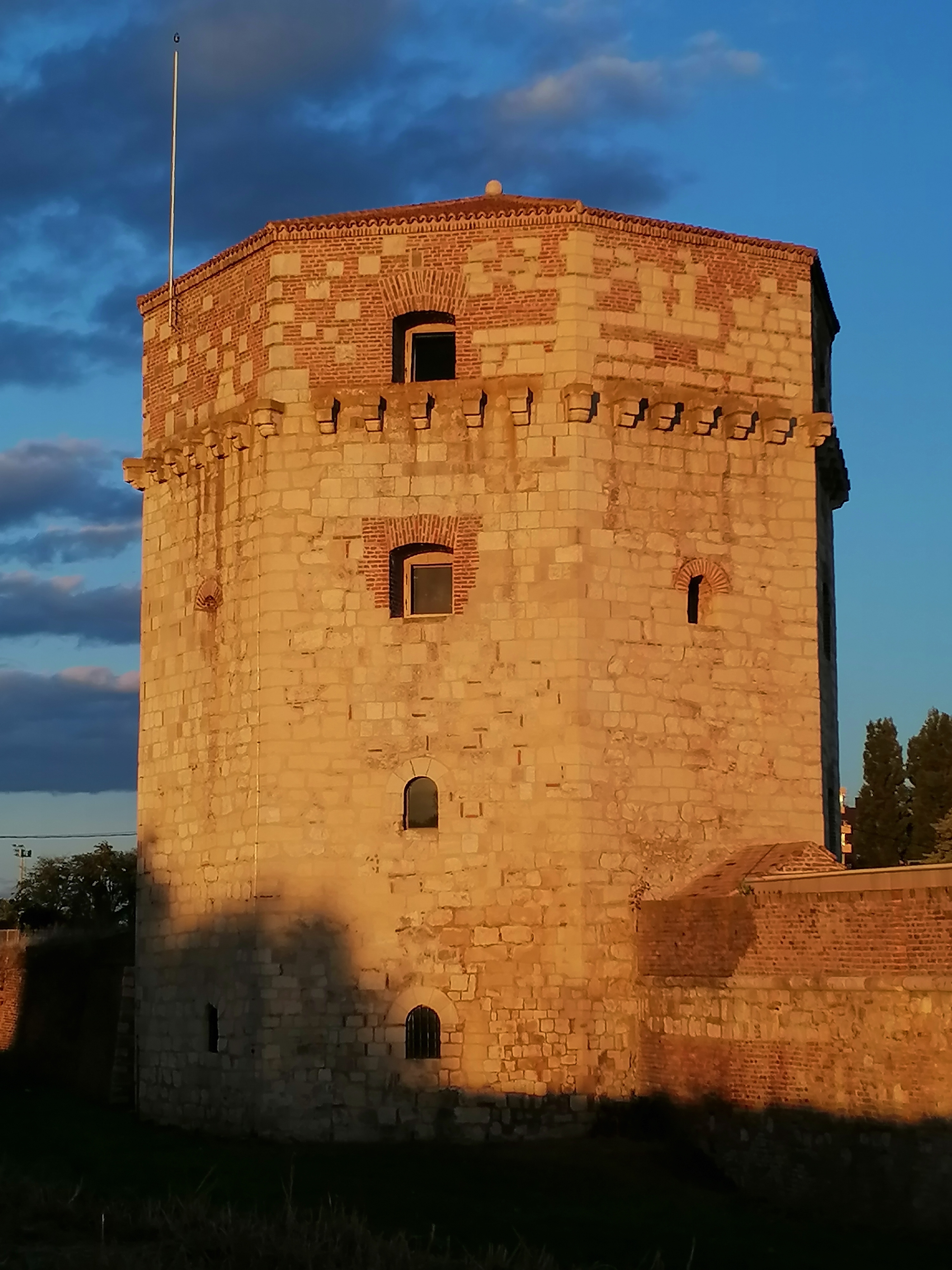
Nebojša Tower

The tower originally called Nebojša Tower was built in the early 15th century, during the reign of despot Stefan Lazarević, who ruled Belgrade from 1403 and made it the capital of Serbia. It functioned as the keep of the fortress and most likely resembled the "Despot's Tower", the keep of the fortress which surrounds the Manasija monastery, which was also founded by Stefan Lazarević. That tower was destroyed during the Siege of Belgrade in 1690, when Ottomans regained control over Belgrade from the Austrians. The siege lasted 8–14 October 1690 and was finished when the Ottomans', during the shelling of the fortress, hit the Austrian main powder magazine. The explosion destroyed the large part of the Little Town section of the fortress (area between the "Defterdar Gate" and the modern Pobednik monument), including the tower itself.

In 1948, after the Informbiro resolution and the ensuing Tito–Stalin split, a construction of the defensive bunker began on the fortress. In the process, the 5 m (16 ft) thick rampart of the original Nebojša Tower was discovered. It was destroyed and by 1949 the bunker which covers 200 m^{2} (2,200 sq ft) was finished. The tallest point of the bunker is the cannon dome which was used for the artillery and military units. Abandoned later, it was adapted for the tourists and opened in December 2012. It has parts of the authentic inventory from the 1950s: safety doors, beds, ventilation, water tanks, etc.

=== Origin ===
The present Nebojša Tower was built c.1460 by the Hungarians, who ruled Belgrade at the time. When it was built, it was located at the entrance into the city's "Danube port", in the Lower Town of the fortress and was part of the defense system which was protecting Belgrade from the Ottoman invasion after the Siege of Belgrade in 1456. During the 1521 Siege of Belgrade, cannons from the tower successfully defended the city from July to August, until the Ottomans managed to set the tower on fire. Only then did they manage to conquer the city. One chronicler of the siege wrote: "In the lower fortification of Belgrade on the Danube towards Mustafa–pasha position there was a tower. That tower was used as a stronghold by the faithless (Christians). It prevented assault. When assault was made yesterday many of them were killed by canons from the tower. After destruction that tower was put on fire today by a vanquisher. The faithless were beaten up and gave in. From the position of Mustafa-pasha an opportunity for assault was thus created." The sultan Suleiman the Magnificent ordered for the tower to be rebuilt.

=== 18th century ===
After Austrians reconquered Belgrade as part of their rule of northern Serbia 1718-39, they began a massive reconstruction of the fortress as they envisioned Belgrade as the typical fortified baroque city of the day and the foothold of their further military operations against the Ottomans. Belgrade Fortress was reconstructed and the new bastion fortifications were built. In that period, the Nebojša Tower was also reconstructed. The old, upper part of the tower was lowered and a new floor with the vault was built. Old embrasures were walled up and the new, larger ones were opened to fit the modern, bigger cannons. At that time, the inner, war port, which was protected by the tower, still existed. In c.1725 Austrians built an arsenal at the base of the tower. It was used for cannon casting by the Serbian rebels 1807-1813, headed by Karađorđe, during the First Serbian Uprising.

=== Dungeon ===
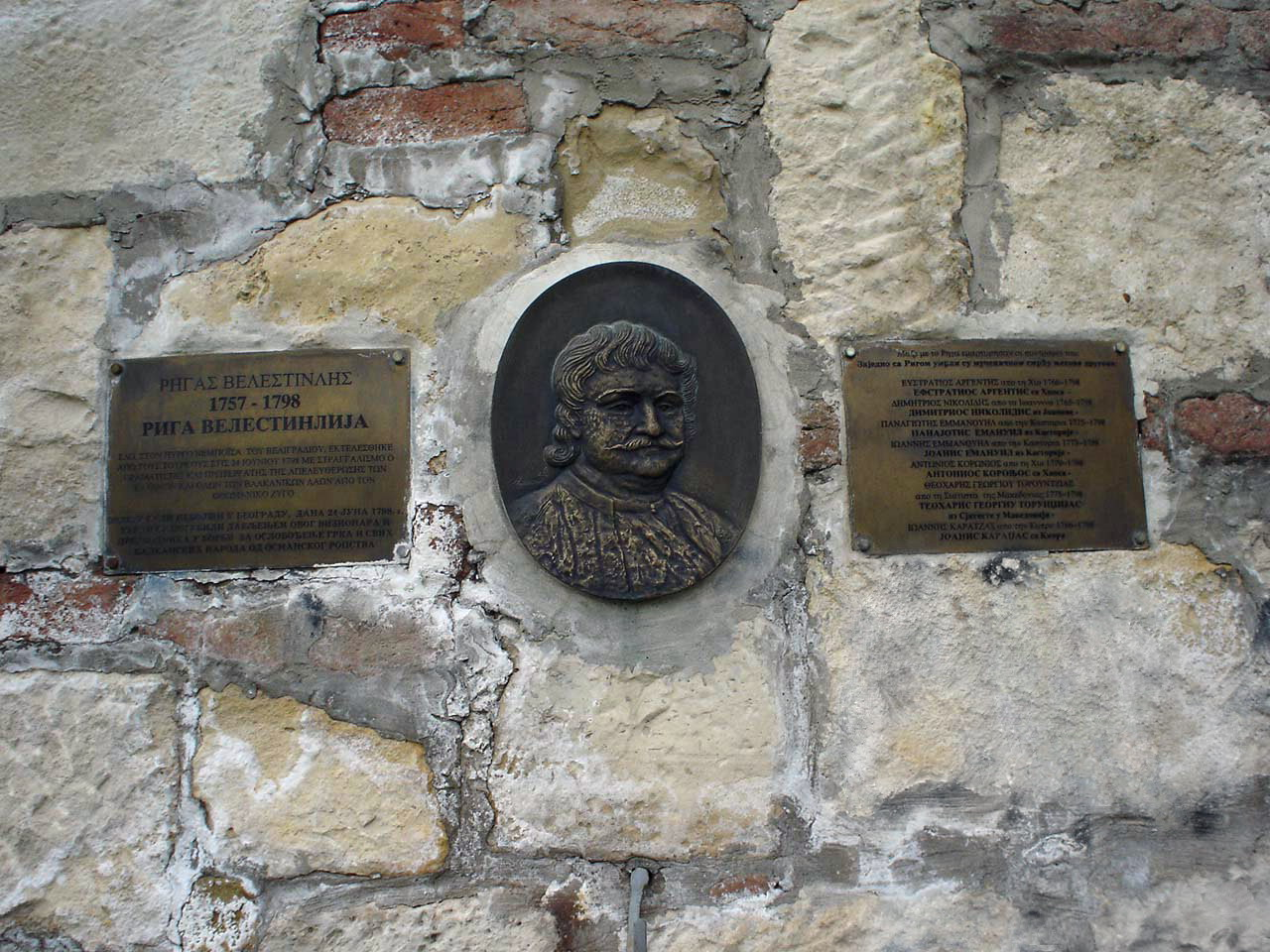
Rigas Feraios' memorial plaque

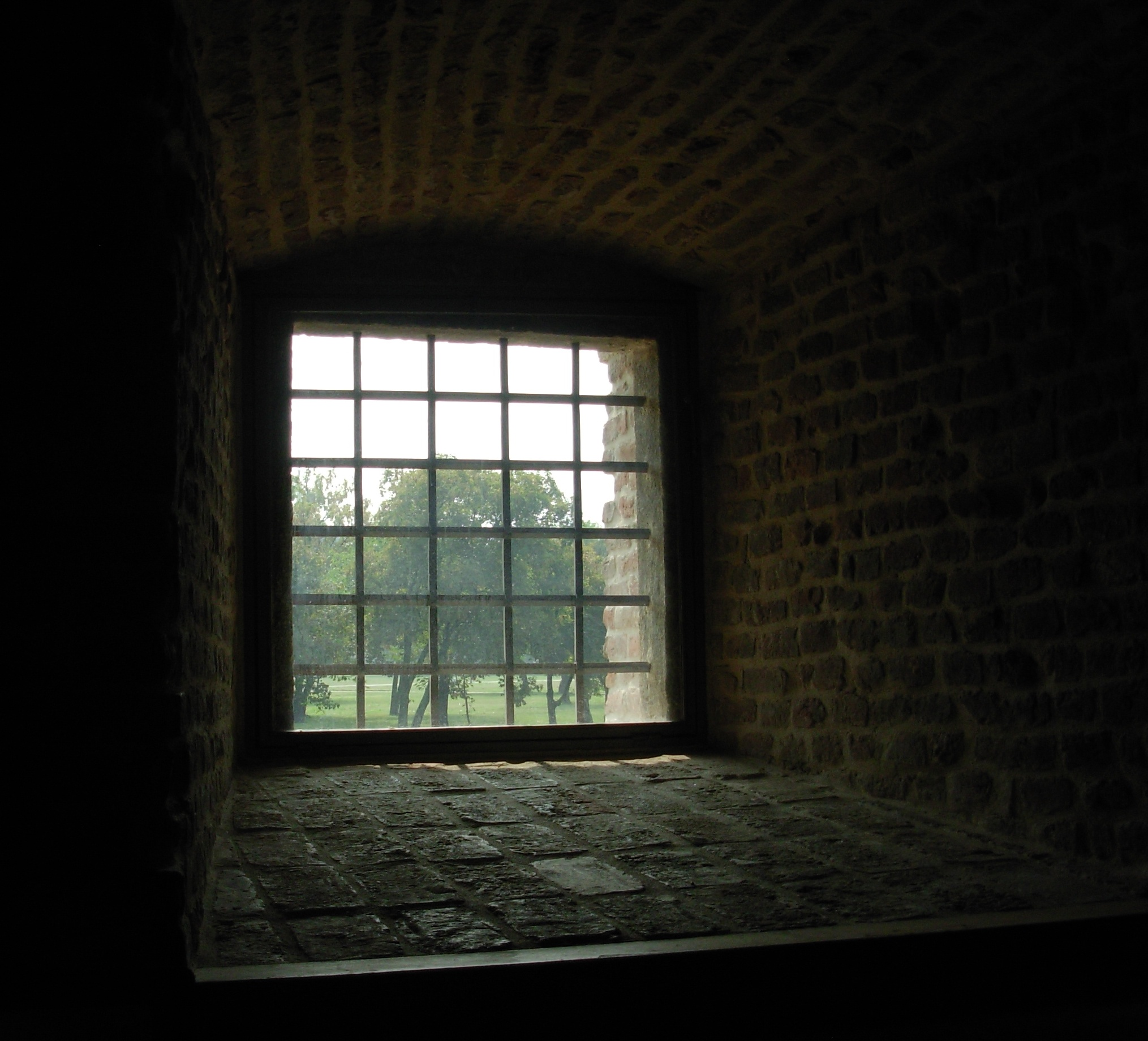
View through the tower's window

After regaining Belgrade in 1739, the Ottomans closed and covered the port with earth so the tower lost its military importance and was turned into a dungeon. Due to the terrible conditions and the practice of strangling the prisoners and throwing them through the openings of the tower into the river, the Nebojša Tower became one of Belgrade’s darkest symbols. The most famous captive was the Greek revolutionary and poet Rigas Feraios, who was strangled in 1798. Methodius, Metropolitan of Belgrade was also killed in the tower in 1801.

=== 20th century ===
Hugo Buli (1875-1942), son of the noted Belgrade merchant Edidija Buli, was a student in Germany when he brought the first leather football to Serbia. His father was hiding the ball from him, but Hugo, who was already playing football for "Germania" club in Berlin, managed to form the first football section within the "Soko" gymnastics society on 12 May 1896. On the field in front of the Nebojša Tower, the first football match in Serbia was played on 19 May 1896. The field wasn't marked with lines and had no goals, only bricks which marked where the goal should be. The players didn't know the rules, so Hugo was explaining everything. There were 50 spectators. New reports of the "gymnastics game" under the tower survived, though the newspapers referred to it as a fun, rather than as a proper sport. Hugo founded the first football association in Serbia in 1899, and is considered a father of football in Serbia. Being from a well known Jewish Buli family, he perished in the Holocaust, in the Sajmište concentration camp sometime in 1941-1942.

Preparing the invasion of Belgrade, Austro-Hungarian army across the Sava conducted the heaviest bombardment of Belgrade on 6 October 1914, starting at 14:00. Around 30,000 grenades were fired all over Belgrade. On 7 October, at 2:30, Belgrade was lit by searchlights from the Austro-Hungarian side, and fire from 300 cannons, howitzers and mortars was opened on the city, turning it into the flaming torch. This was a prelude for Austro-Hungarian landing on the island of Ada Ciganlija and the Belgrade Fortress' Lower Town, at the Nebojša Tower. A total of 14 Austro-Hungarian and 6 Serbian companies were engaged in the tower sector. The invaders initially suffered heavy losses at the tower's base, but by the morning they took over the embankment and the railway, south of the tower.

Former armory was buried and effectively cut in two when the modern Donjogradski boulevard (today Vojvoda Bojović boulevard) was built over it in 1935.

During the World War II, the Sava river brought dead bodies which floated all the way from the Ustaše Jasenovac Concentration Camp, almost 300 km (190 mi) upstream. The fishermen were taking the bodies out of the water, so as former Italian soldiers turned prisoners by the German occupational forces after capitulation of Italy in September 1943. Bodies were buried around the tower and in the mass grave at the nearby Gate of Charles VI in the fortress' Lower Town. The mass graves are unmarked. From 1941 to 1945, some 5,000 bodies were retrieved from the Sava (of which only one person was identified), with majority being buried at the Belgrade New Cemetery and Topčider Cemetery.

The tower was reconstructed in 1963.

== Architecture ==
The Nebojša Tower belongs to the oldest type of the early artillery cannon towers. When built, it represented an important achievement in the architecture of the time. It has a regular octagon base, with 2.8 m (9 ft 2 in) thick walls. It has a ground floor and three storeys, with the total height of 19 m (62 ft) All floors have embrasures, or the cannon openings, on all sides, so that invaders can be shelled whether they advance from the river or from the land. The tower used to have a leveled top with the battlements and protruded wooden corbels. When Austrians reconstructed the tower in the first half of the 18th century, the top with the battlements was replaced with the roof construction which remained to this day.

== Museum ==
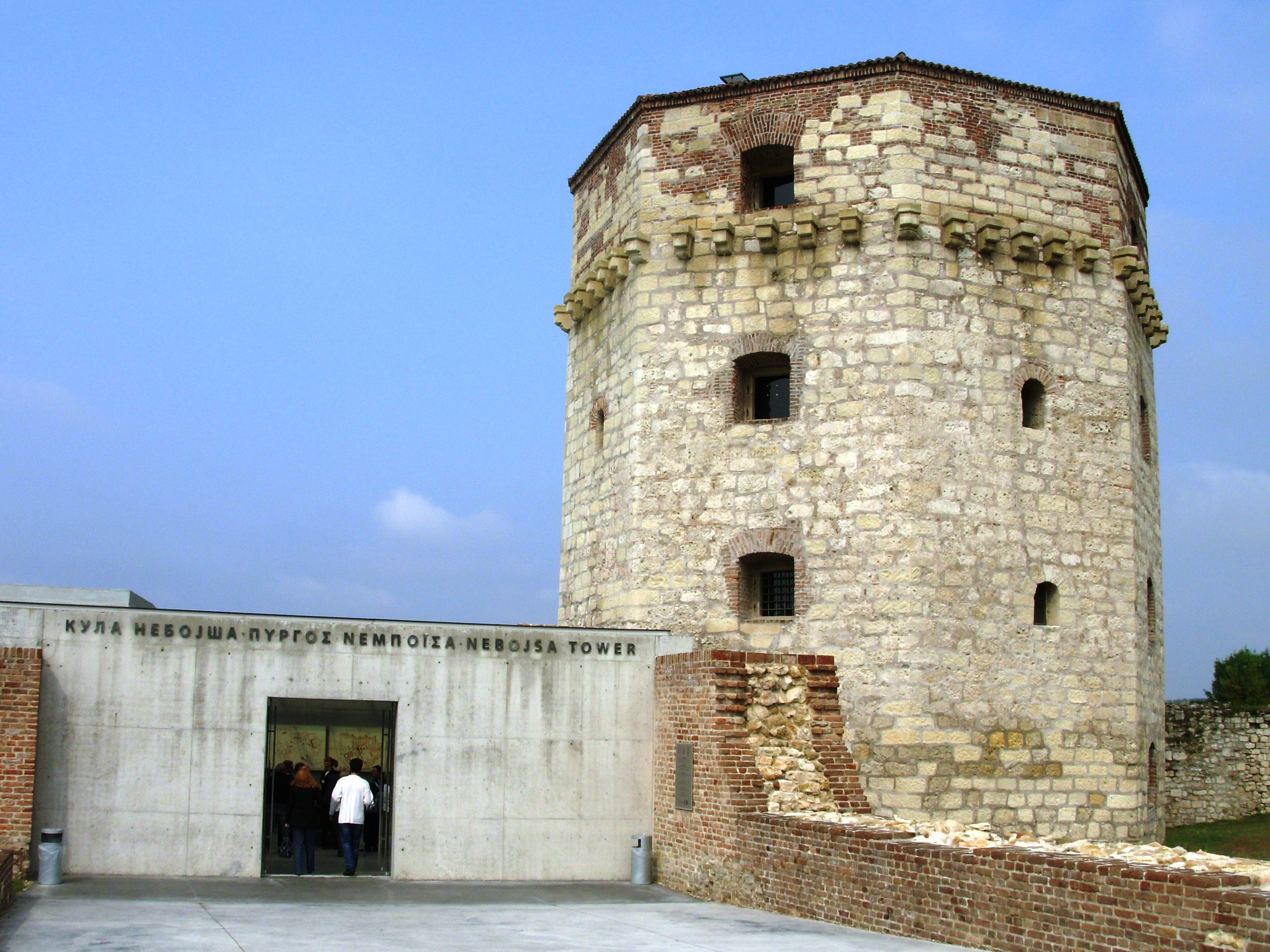
Entrance into the museum, after the 2010 reconstruction

Idea of turning the tower into the cultural center was announced in the late 2007. It was jump started by the €1,4 million donation from the European Centre for Byzantine and Post-Byzantine Monuments from Thessaloniki and conducted in the cooperation of the Centre and the Belgrade city administration. During the excavations around the tower, the remains of the Austrian armory from 1725 were discovered and conserved. The revitalization project was drafted by 148 experts from 18 institutes and companies, including the Serbian Academy of Sciences and Arts. The construction works lasted for 17 months, from June 2009 to December 2010. Almost 2,500 m^{2} (27,000 sq ft) of walls (including the façades) were restored or conserved, while 3,000 m^{3} (110,000 cu ft) of ramparts were revitalized. The revitalization process included embedding various materials: 100,000 hand-made bricks, 1,050 m^{3} (37,000 cu ft) of concrete, 150 tons of steel and iron while 135 m^{2} (1,450 sq ft) of glass was used to adapt the cannon openings into windows.

Former waterfront rampart is adapted into the annex of the tower and serves as the lobby of the museum. An extension of the lobby, in the direction of the former watergate No. 2, is turned into the meeting hall with 500 seats. All sections of the exhibitions are multimedial and interactive and the audio narration is multilingual: in Serbian, Greek and English. Entry section addresses the history of the tower. Ground floor setup marks the prison period and the slavery in general. Hanging in the air are 150 portraits of the political prisoners. First floor is dedicated to Rigas Feraios, while the narration cites lyrics from his poems. Exhibition on the second floor is devoted to the First Serbian Uprising while the final floor celebrates the development of Belgrade after the liberation from the Ottomans where multimedia includes the reflection of the water on the ceiling, from the central cauldron, and video projections on the walls.

== Water Town ==
In the mediaeval period, the area to the west and south-west, between the tower and the Sava, was a location of the "Water Town" (Serbian: Водена варош, romanized: Vodena varoš) settlement, built by despot Stefan Lazarević in the early 15th century. It was known for an open green market and a watermill. The settlement was established above the port of "Donji Grad", one of three which Belgrade had at the time (two on the Danube and one on the Sava). The marketplace was especially known as a fish market, but other goods were also traded: grains, fruits, vegetables, wool, hide, fur and wax.

Today it is part of the promenade along the Sava, arranged as a wide plateau with anchored barge-restaurants (splav). Since 2007, the "Fish Fest", an annual festival is held on the location. It is a competition of the chefs from Serbia and surrounding countries in preparing fish courses, like fish soup or a stew. Other, local types of food are also prepared. The festival is organized like a fair, with agricultural products being displayed for selling, music concerts, workshops, children games, etc. The festival is held in August-September.
