= Efimeris =

Greek-language newspaper published in Vienna from 1790 to 1797

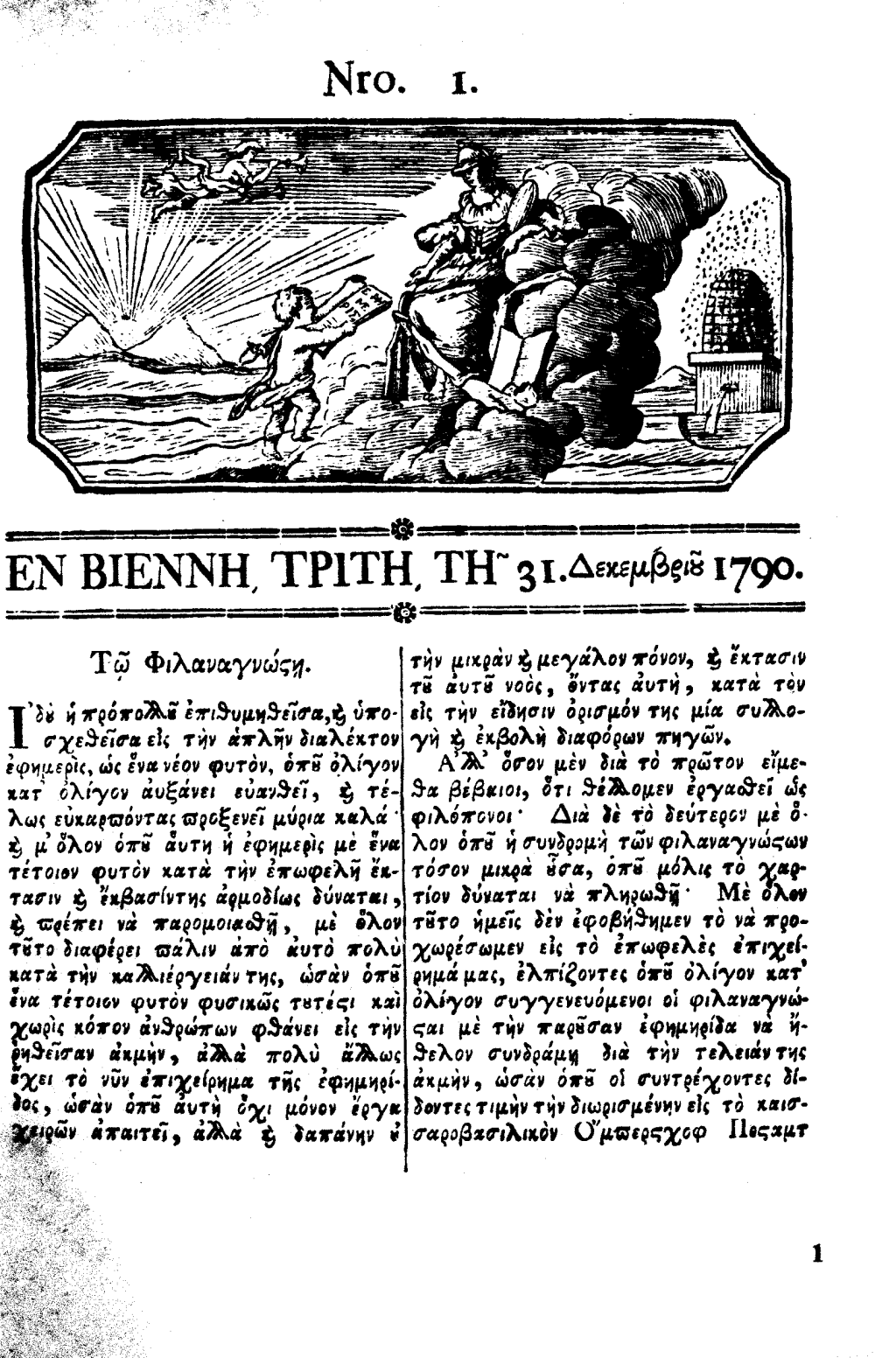
The title page of the issue of Efimeris of Tuesday 31 December 1790 (Julian calendar), or 11 January 1791 (Gregorian calendar).

Efimeris (Greek: Εφημερίς) was a Greek-language newspaper published in Vienna from 1790 to 1797. It is the oldest Greek newspaper of which issues have survived till today.

== History ==
In 1790, the two Aromanian typographer Markides Pouliou brothers, Poulios and Georgios, from Siatista, started publishing the newspaper in the Greek, Serbo-Croatian ("Illyrian") and German languages, after successfully negotiating a license from the Austrian authorities. Vienna, the Austrian capital, was at that time an important commercial center for Greek merchants. The newspaper published the Declaration of the Rights of Man and of the Citizen in serials, as well as several works by Rigas Feraios. The newspaper's run lasted until 1797, when Georgios Markides Pouliou was arrested along with Rigas Feraios for their publication of "revolutionary and godless" works, and the paper was shut down in January 1798.

Many of its original issues can be seen in various public libraries in Greece, and in 2000, the Academy of Athens reprinted a collected edition of the newspaper.

== See also ==
- Serbskija novini

== Sources ==
- Matsou, Katerina (2006-06-18). "Εφημερίς" (1790–1797) – Ο άθλος και η περιπέτεια της πρώτης ελληνικής εφημερίδας (in Greek). Archived from the original on 1 April 2008.
