= George Kalaras =

Greek physician, philosopher and a writer

George Kalaras (Greek: Γεώργιος Καλαράς) (c. 1781 – 23 December 1824) was a medical doctor, a philosopher and a writer.

== Biography ==
He was born in Agionori of Corinthia in the Ottoman Empire and studied medicine with philosophy at Pisa in Italy. He was initiated into Filiki Eteria in Corinth in 1818. He, in turn, initiated several other Corinthians to Filiki Eteria, including Panoutsos Notaras. He participated in several events of the Greek War of Independence including the Battle of Dervenakia.

Paschalis Kitromilides, in his treatise "From Republican Patriotism to National Sentiment" considers George Kalaras a possible editor of the Hellenic Nomarchy, as Kalaras printed his university thesis, "A general idea of some qualities of the bodies and on the nature of qualities of temperature" at the printing workshop of Tommaso Masi in Livorno, Italy during 1806. It is believed that the Hellenic Nomarchy may also have been printed around the same period. Kitromilides' view is supported by K. Papachristos, who provided further evidence that George Kalaras was the anonymous author/publisher of the Hellenic Nomarchy.

George Kalaras was a member of the Second National Assembly in March 1823, representing Corinthia. He had three sons, whom he named Harmodius and Aristogeiton after the well-known Athenian tyrannicides, and a third son, Thrasyboulos.

He died of pneumonia on 23 December 1824, during a diplomatic mission.
