= New Map of Wallachia and part of Transylvania =

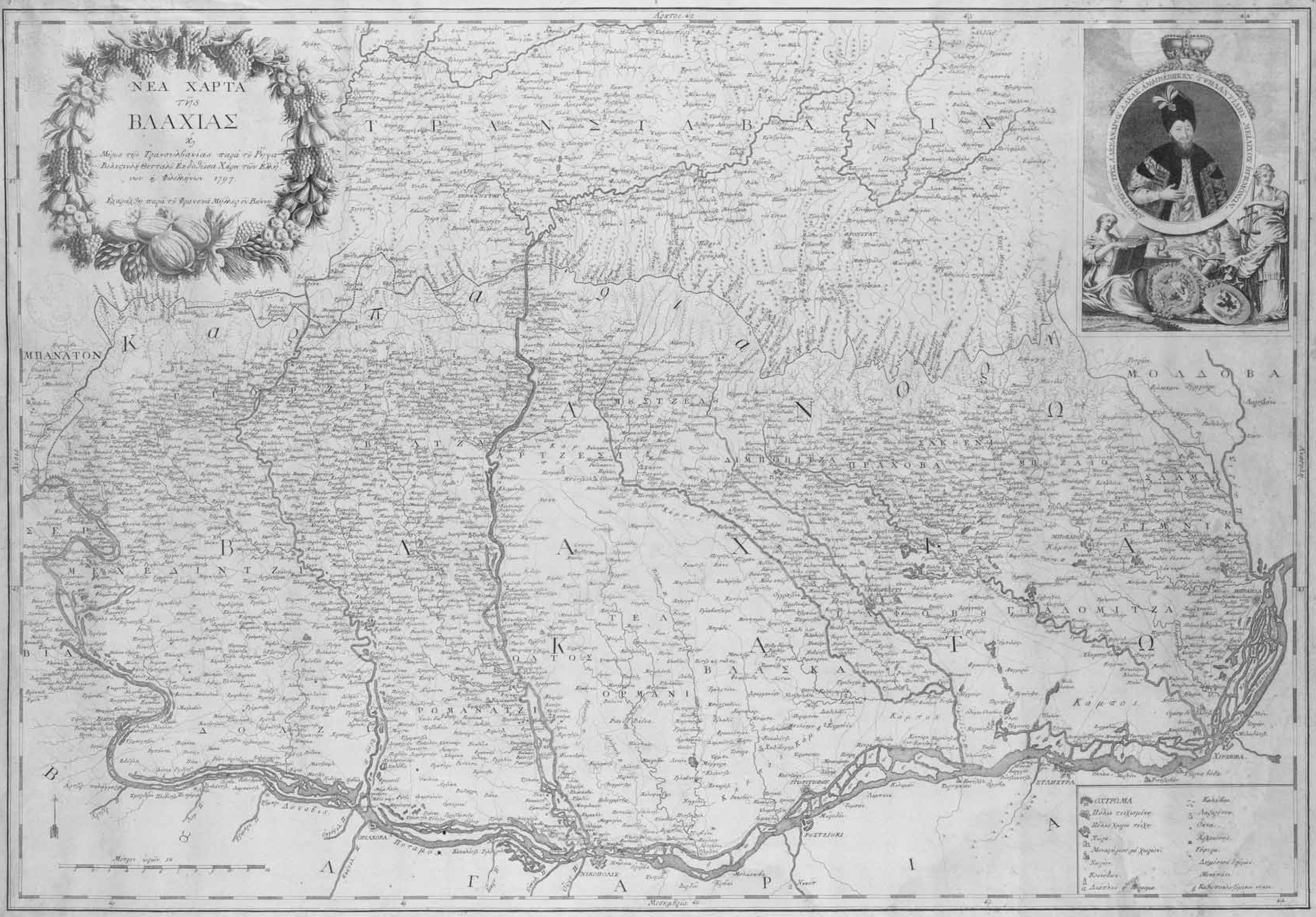
New Map of Wallachia and part of Transylvania, 1797

The New Map of Wallachia is one of the maps of the Danubian Principalities which were printed by Rigas Feraios in 1797 in Vienna, engraved by Franz Müller who was also Rigas' partner in other cartographic works. The other is the General Map of Moldavia. The Map is in black and white, it is 0,85 x 0,63 m. and has the title New Map of Wallachia and part of Transylvania by Rigas Velestinlis from Thessaly, published for the sake of the Greeks and philhellenes – 1797-engraved by Franz Müller in Vienna.

== Description ==
The Map illustrates the geophysical state of Wallachia at the time of Rigas Feraios and includes its geographic division, the towns and villages whose names are listed in detail. Within the Map in the left corner stands the title which is integrated into rich floral decoration. On the top right of the Map, into a square frame, Alexander Ypsilantis is depicted, who was ruler of Wallachia for the third time from August 1796 to December 1797, as stated in the votive inscription in Greek «Αμφοτέρους τρις Αλέξανδρος Δάκας αμφιβέβηκεν Υψηλαντίδης μειλίχιος ηγεμόνων». Under the portrait of the ruler, symbolic representations can be distinguished together with the emblems of the Danubian Principalities. The only copy in Greece is being kept in the Library of Chios.

== Archetype of the map ==
The Map of Wallachia is an exact copy of the original map designed by the Austrian cartographer F. J. Ruhedorf under the title: «Mappa specialis Valachiae ex accuratissimis singulorum Distictum Ichnographiis collecta, delineate et dedicate Excellentissimo Domino Comiti de HADIK. Sac.Caes. Reg. Apost. M[ajest] atis, Consillario intimo Campi Mareschallo et supreme Consilii Aulae bellici Praesidenti per. F. Ios. Ruhendorf ex Offis Caes. Reg. ad supreme: Armor. Praefecturan». Ruhedorf's map was published in 1788, a year in which Austrian Empire declared war against Ottoman Empire. It is in color, slightly smaller than Riga's Map, it lists the regions of Wallachia in Roman numerals and the corresponding index. However, Riga's Map includes also a part of Transylvania, which implies that apart from the Map above he also used other sources. In the Library of France is also kept the handwritten map on which Rigas worked for the preparation of the print version.

== Interpretation ==
The designing of the Map of Wallachia and the other cartographic works were the main and long-term engagement of Rigas. The real reason of the publishing of the maps has not been verified. Rigas in person, during his interrogation by the Austrian authorities after his arrest, claimed that he published the Maps purely for commercial reasons, and the authorities accepted his claim. The addition of the portrait of the ruler of Wallachia, the votive inscription and the indication “to the Greeks and philhellenes” allow us to think that the Map was created on demand of Alexander Ypsilantis. Through the position he held, Alexander Ypsilantis contributed to the awakening of the Greeks, in book publishing and dissemination of literature. Furthermore, the symbolic representations accompanying the Map have led to the conclusion that the publishing of the Map is part of the ideological context of Rigas Velestinlis for the formation of a creative and liberal state in the Balkans which would be called the Greek Republic and would include all Christian Ottoman conquered lands.

The Map of Moldova and the New Map of Wallachia were not released in the Danubian Principalities since shortly after their release, Rigas was arrested and all copies were confiscated, making them unique and very hard to find today.

== See also ==
- General Map of Moldavia

== Bibliography ==
- Amandos, K. [Άμαντος, Κ.], Ανέκδοτα έγγραφα περί Ρήγα Βελεστινλή. Σύλλογος προς Διάδοσιν Ωφελίμων Βιβλίων. Ιστορική και Λαογραφική Βιβλιοθήκη Αρ. 7. Αθήνα, 1930.
- Daskalakis, Ap. V. [Δασκαλάκης, Απ. Β.], Les oeuvres de Rhigas Velestinlis, Paris, 1936.
- Daskalakis, Ap. V. [Δασκαλάκης, Απ. Β.], Ο Ρήγας Βελεστινλής ως Διδάσκαλος του Γένους. ΄Εκδοσις νέα μετά συμπληρώσεων και προσθηκών. Αθήνα, 1977.
- Enepekidis, Pol. [Ενεπεκίδης, Πολ.], Ρήγας – Υψηλάντης – Καποδίστριας. Έρευνα εις τα Αρχεία της Αυστρίας, Γερμανίας, Ιταλίας, Γαλλίας και Ελλάδος, Αθήνα, 1965.
- Fotinos, D. [Φωτεινός, Δ.], Ιστορία της πάλαι Δακίας, τα νυν Τρανσιλβανίας, Βλαχίας, και Μολδαυϊας. Εκ διαφόρων παλαιών και νεωτέρων συγγραφέων συνερανισθείσα…., τόμοι Α και Β. Εν Βιέννη της Αουστρίας, εκ του Τυπογραφείου Ιω. Βαρθολ. Σβεκίου, 1818.
- Kamarianos, N. [Καμαριάνος, Ν.], Ρήγας Βελεστινλής, Συμπληρώσεις και διορθώσεις για τη ζωή και το έργο του. Εισαγωγή – Μετάφραση – σχόλια Αθ. Καραθανάσης, Επιστημονική Εταιρεία Μελέτης Φερών – Βελεστίνου-Ρήγα, Αθήνα 1999.
- Karamberopoulos, D. [Καραμπερόπουλος, Δ.], Οι Χάρτες Βλαχίας και Μολδαβίας του Ρήγα Βελεστινλή. Βιέννη 1797. Νέα στοιχεία – Ευρετήριο- Αυθεντική Επανέκδοση. Αθήνα, Επιστημονική Εταιρεία Μελέτης Φερών – Βελεστίνου- Ρήγα. 2005.
- Laios, G. [Λάιος, Γ.], Οι χάρτες του Ρήγα, Αθήνα, ΔΙΕΕ, 1960.
- Legrand Émile, [Λεγκράντ Αιμ.], Ανέκδοτα έγγραφα περί Ρήγα Βελεστινλή και των συν αυτώ μαρτυρησάντων. Εκ των εν Βιέννη αρχείων εξαχθέντα και δημοσιευθέντα υπό Αιμιλίου Λεγράνδ. Μετά μεταφράσεως ελληνικής υπό Σπυρίδωνος Λάμπρου. Αθήνησιν, 1891.
- Livieratos, Ef. [Λιβιεράτος, Ευ.], Χαρτογραφίας και χαρτών Περιήγησις. 25 Αιώνες από τους Ίωνες στον Πτολεμαίο και τον Ρήγα. Αθήνα, Εθνική Χαρτοθήκη, 1998.
- Sturza, Mihail-Dimitri, Dictionnaire Historique et Genealogique des Grandes Familles de Grece d’ Albanie et de Constantinople, Paris, 1983.
- Vranousis, L. I. [Βρανούσης, Λ. Ι.], Ρήγας. Έρευνα, συναγωγή και μελέτη. Αθήναι, Βασική Βιβλιοθήκη -10
- Exhibition catalogue: Ρήγα Βελεστινλή. Έκθεση αφιερωμένη στα 200 χρόνια από το θάνατό του, Αθήνα, Εθνικό Ιστορικό Μουσείο, 1998. (κατάλογος έκθεσης).
- Παγκόσμιο Βιογραφικό Λεξικό, Αθήνα, Εκδοτική Αθηνών, 1985.
- Μεγάλη Ελληνική Εγκυκλοπαίδεια, Αθήνα, Π. Δρανδάκη, Φοίνιξ, χ.χρ.
