= Caragiu =

Caragiu is an Aromanian surname that may refer to:

- Geta Caragiu (1929–2018), Romanian sculptor of Aromanian descent
- Matilda Caragiu Marioțeanu (1927–2009), Romanian linguist of Aromanian descent
- Toma Caragiu (1925–1977), Romanian actor of Aromanian descent
