= Mihail G. Boiagi =

Aromanian grammarian and professor

- Born: Mihail George Boiagi; 3 February 1780; Buda, Habsburg monarchy
- Died: 1828, 1842 or 1843; Buda, Austrian Empire
- Occupations: Grammarian, professor
- Known for: The publication of the first Aromanian writing system in the Latin alphabet

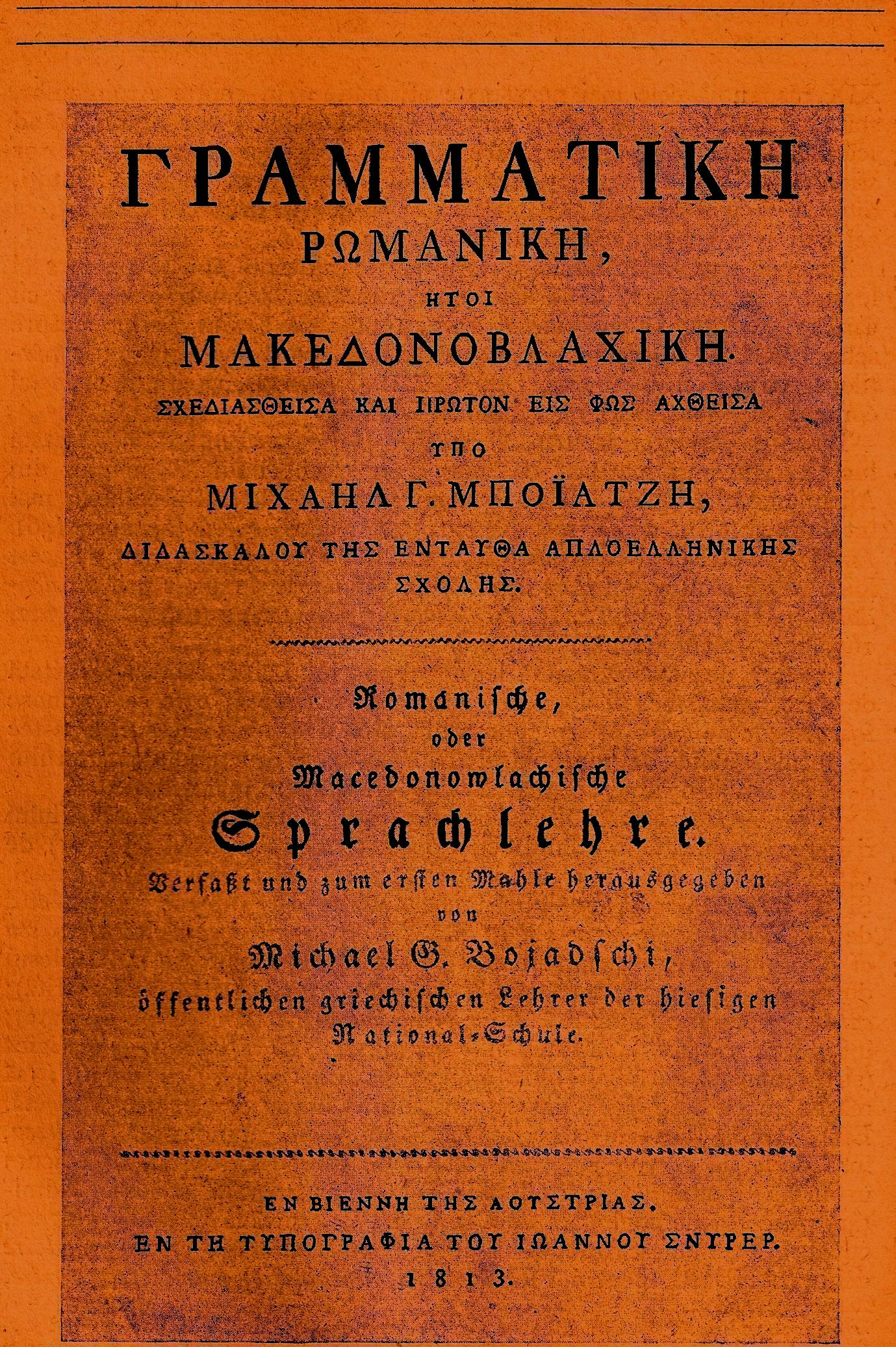
Cover of Mihail G. Boiagi's 1813 Aromanian grammar book, "Romance or Macedono-Vlach Grammar"

Mihail George Boiagi (3 February 1780 – 1828, 1842 or 1843) was an Aromanian grammarian and professor in the Habsburg monarchy and the Austrian Empire. He was born on 3 February 1780 in Buda, today Budapest in Hungary. Boiagi was one of the first grammarians from the Balkans and a professor in a school in Vienna, where he taught Greek. He had origins from Moscopole, today in Albania. Boiagi was one of the main figures of the Aromanian diaspora in Austria and Hungary, the capitals of which, Vienna and Budapest respectively, became gathering centers for members of this community in the 19th century. Boiagi introduced the Aromanian historian Dimitrie Cozacovici to the Aromanian community of Austria and Hungary after Cozacovici's migration from Metsovo, today in Greece, to Buda.

In 1813, in Vienna, Boiagi published the grammar book Γραμματική Ρωμαϊκή ήτοι Μακεδονοβλαχική/Romanische oder Macedonowlachische Sprachlehre ("Romance or Macedono-Vlach Grammar"). Written in German and Greek, although with texts in Aromanian, it introduced the first writing system for the Aromanian language in the Latin alphabet; prior to this, Aromanian had been written with the Greek script. This system was characterized by the use of digraphs to avoid the use of diacritics for those sounds not present in the Latin alphabet. Thus, instead of using e.g. "č", "ľ", "ń" or "ș", Boiagi made use of "cs", "lj", "nj" and "sh". The Greek letter "θ" was rendered as "th". However, some diacritics were included in the system, namely "â", "ç" and "ĵ". His writing system was not adopted by any authors after the publication of his grammar. The book's preface elaborates on the common Roman origin of Aromanians and Romanians.

A copy of his 1813 grammar was republished in 1863 at Bucharest, in the Romanian United Principalities, by Dimitrie Bolintineanu, financed by Costache Negri. Boiagi also published Orbis Pictus de Amos Comenius ("Orbis Pictus by Amos Comenius") at Vienna in 1819 and Scurtă gramatică neogreacă pentru junimea greacă și pentru germani ("Short Neo-Greek Grammar for the Greek Youth and for Germans") at the same city in 1821. The Greek Ecumenical Patriarchate of Constantinople, disapproving of his work, blacklisted Boiagi's grammar and excommunicated him, although he kept his post as professor in Vienna. Boiagi died in either 1828, 1842 or 1843, in Buda.

== See also ==
- Aromanian diaspora
