= Codex Dimonie =

Collection of early Aromanian-language religious texts

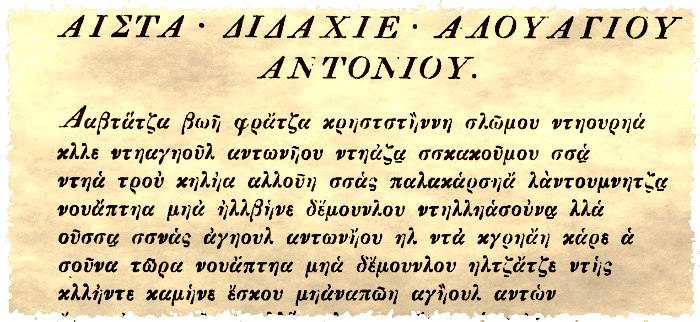
Fragment of the Codex Dimonie

The Codex Dimonie is a collection of Aromanian-language biblical and religious texts translated from Greek. It represents the most comprehensive collection of early Aromanian texts known to date, comprising 127 loose sheets, which were probably bound in the past. The Codex Dimonie was discovered by Gustav Weigand, who subsequently published it, in 1889 in the house of the brothers Iancu and Mihail Dimonie in Ohrid (Aromanian: Ohãrda), then in the Ottoman Empire and now in North Macedonia.

The Codex Dimonie has been dated as being from the end of the 18th century or the beginning of the 19th century. Its exact year of writing is unknown. It is also unknown who made the translations, although it is assumed that it was more than one person. The Codex Dimonie includes the Acts of the Apostles, the Gospel of Mark and the Liturgy of Saint John Chrysostom. They are translations taken from Greek-language authors such as Damaskinos Stouditis and Ephrem the Syrian. These translations present several features of the Grabovean dialect of Aromanian. The variety of spellings that are used are indicative that the language lacked literary tradition at the time.

The Codex Dimonie is one of the earliest Aromanian-language works along with the also anonymous Aromanian Missal and the publications of Theodore Kavalliotis, Daniel Moscopolites and Constantin Ucuta. The texts that make up the Codex Dimonie are notably heterogeneous, indicating that they may have been written by several different authors. The place of origin of the Codex Dimonie is unknown, but the translators of the texts that wrote it were probably from Moscopole, once a prosperous Aromanian city now in Albania. The main author is presumed to have been the great-uncle of the Dimonie brothers with whom Weigand found the manuscripts; he might have been an Aromanian from Moscopole, or possibly descended from an Albanian-speaking family from the city.

The authors of the manuscripts were fluent in Greek (albeit with poor grasp on the language's orthography), Turkish and Albanian. The manuscripts are entirely written in Aromanian using the Greek alphabet. As this alphabet does not have graphemes to represent several Aromanian sounds, there is a defective and inconsistent rendering of these sounds through diacritics and the combination of graphemes.

The intentions of the authors of the Codex Dimonie are unknown. Considering that the manuscripts were not structured in the form of teaching material, they likely did not intend to establish a writing system for Aromanian or spread its use as a church language. The goal of the authors would rather have been more modest, limited to the translation and dissemination of religious texts, especially sermons, the lives of saints and knowledge on Aromanian religious practices.
