= Aromanian language =

Romance language of the Balkans

Aromanian
- Vlach; Macedo-Romanian
- limba armãneascã, limba armãnã, armãneashti, armãneashte, armãneashci, armãneashce, limba rrãmãneascã, limba rrãmãnã, rrãmãneshti
- Native to: Greece, Albania, North Macedonia, Bulgaria, Romania, Serbia
- Region: Balkans
- Ethnicity: Aromanians
- Native speakers: 210,000 (2018)
- Language family: Indo-European: Italic; Latino-Faliscan; Latin; Romance; Eastern Romance; Aromanian
- Early forms: Old Latin: Vulgar Latin; Proto-Romance; Common Romanian
- Dialects: Fãrsherot (incl. Muzachiar); Moscopolean; Gopeš–Malovište; Pindean (incl. Olympiot); Grãmostean
- Writing system: Latin (Aromanian alphabet)
- Signed forms: Manually coded Aromanian

Official status
- Official language in: Kruševo (North Macedonia)
- Recognised minority language in: Albania; North Macedonia

Language codes
- ISO 639-2: rup
- ISO 639-3: rup
- Glottolog: arom1237
- ELP: Aromanian
- Linguasphere: 51-AAD-ba
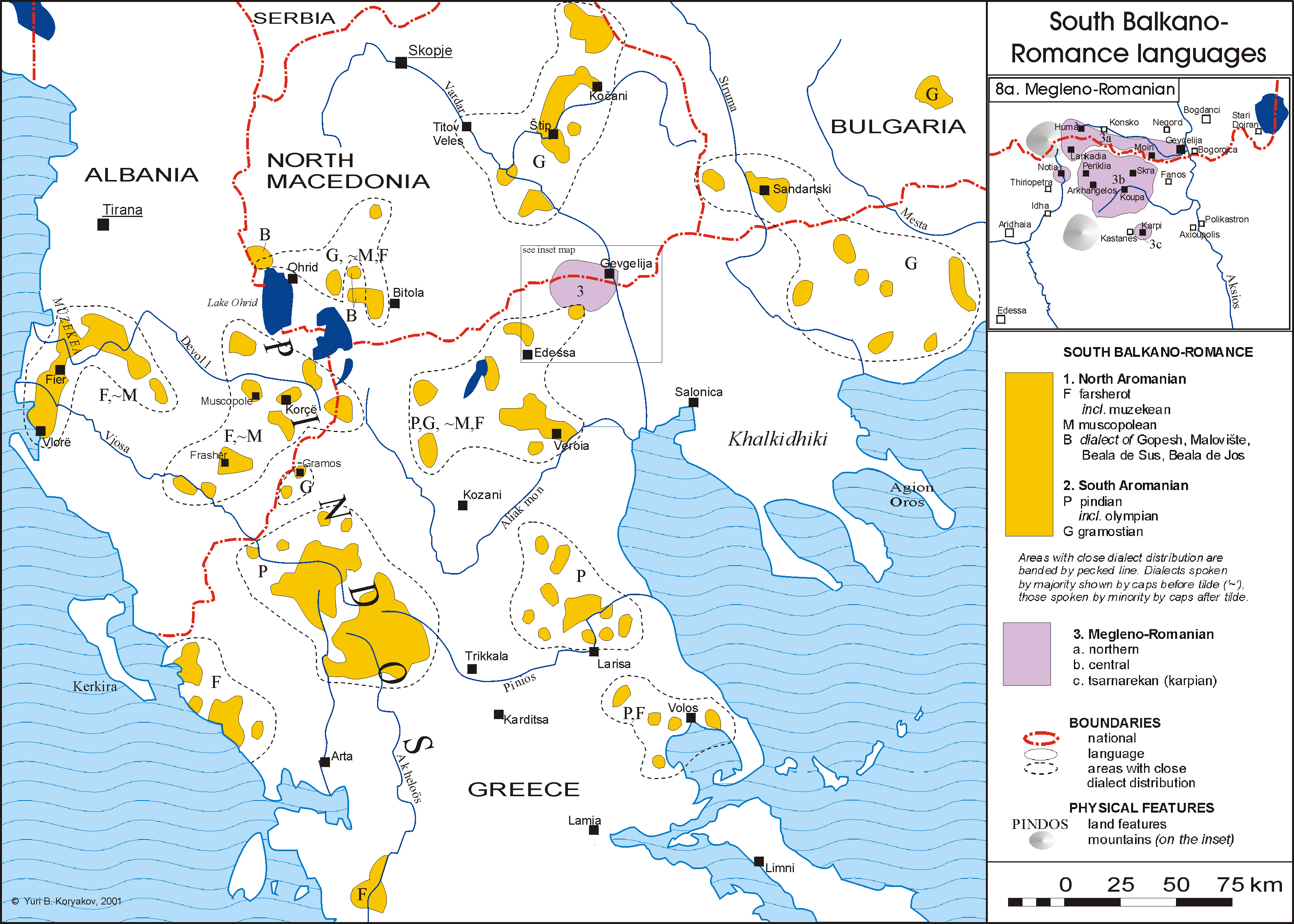
- Distribution and dialects of the Aromanian language in the southwestern Balkans

- Aromanian is classified as Definitely Endangered by UNESCO Atlas of the World's Languages in Danger.

An Aromanian speaking in the Gramostean dialect, recorded in Bucharest, Romania

The Aromanian language (Aromanian: limba armãneascã, limba armãnã, armãneashti, armãneashte, armãneashci, armãneashce or limba rrãmãneascã, limba rrãmãnã, rrãmãneshti), also known as Vlach or Macedo-Romanian, is an Eastern Romance language, similar to Megleno-Romanian, Istro-Romanian and Romanian, spoken in Southeastern Europe. Its speakers are called Aromanians or Vlachs (a broader term and an exonym in widespread use to define Romance communities in the Balkans).

Aromanian shares many features with modern Romanian, including similar morphology and syntax, as well as a large common vocabulary inherited from Latin. They are considered to have developed from Common Romanian, a common stage of all the Eastern Romance varieties. (Note: The internal classification of the Eastern Romance languages presented in Petrucci (1999) proposes a bipartite split into Northern and Southern branches, with the Northern branch splitting into Istro-Romanian and Daco-Romanian. By contrast, the classification presented within Glottolog v4.8 proposes a bipartite split between Aromanian and Northern Romanian, the latter of which is further split into Istro-Romanian and Eastern Romanian, from which Daco-Romanian and Megleno-Romanian are hypothesized to have split from.) An important source of dissimilarity between Romanian and Aromanian is the adstratum languages (external influences); whereas Romanian has been influenced to a greater extent by the Slavic languages, Aromanian has been more influenced by Greek, with which it has been in close contact throughout its history.

== Geographic distribution ==
Aromanian is native to Albania, Bulgaria, Greece, North Macedonia, Romania and Serbia. In 2018, it was estimated that Aromanian had 210,000 native speakers, of which 50,000 were in Albania, 50,000 in Greece, 50,000 in Romania, 32,000 in Serbia, 18,200 in North Macedonia, and 9,800 in Bulgaria. Aromanian-speakers also exist in the diaspora, with at least 53 speakers recorded to be living in Australia at the time of the 2021 Australian census.

== Official status ==
Aromanian has a degree of official recognition in North Macedonia, where it is taught as a subject in some primary schools. In North Macedonia, Aromanian-speakers also have the right to use the language in court proceedings. Since 2006, Aromanian has had the status of a second official municipal language in the city of Kruševo, the only place where Aromanian has any kind of official status apart from general state recognition.

Apart from North Macedonia, the Aromanians are also recognized in Albania as a national minority.

== History ==
Dictionary of four Balkan languages (Greek, Aromanian, Bulgarian and Albanian), by Daniel Moscopolites

Aromanian, Daco-Romanian (Romanian), Istro-Romanian language, and Megleno-Romanian language are descendants of a proto-language called Common Romanian, itself descending from the Proto-Romance language. No later than the 10th century Common Romanian split into southern and northern dialects, and Aromanian and Romanian have developed differently from these two distinct dialects of the proto language over the course of the next one thousand years.

Greek influences are much stronger in Aromanian than in other Eastern Romance languages, especially because Aromanian has used Greek words to coin new words (neologisms), especially within Greece, while Romanian has based most of its neologisms on French. However, there has also been an increasing tendency for Aromanian-speakers outside of Greece to borrow terms from Romanian, due to the shared alphabet and contact with Romanian over the Internet, where Romanian-language material is much more available than it is in Aromanian.

With the arrival of the Turks in the Balkans, Aromanian also received some Turkish words. Still, the lexical composition remains mainly Romance.

Compared to other Balkan languages, the earliest documents and manuscripts of Aromanian appear late. This is due to the historical predominance of the Greek language in the region and the successive destruction of Aromanian books and documents throughout history. The oldest known written text in the language is an inscription from 1731 by Nektarios Terpos at the Ardenica Monastery, now in Albania. It is followed by the inscription of the so-called Simota Vase, dated to the first half of the 18th century. In the Monastery of the Holy Apostles near Kleino (Aromanian: Clinova), now Greece, there is an inscription in Aromanian dated from around 1780. The St. Athanasius Church in Moscopole, now Albania, also includes an old Aromanian writing. Other early Aromanian manuscripts are the Aromanian Missal potentially from the beginning of the 18th century, the works of Theodore Kavalliotis (1770), Constantin Ucuta (1797), Daniel Moscopolites (1802), Gheorghe Constantin Roja (1808/1809) and Mihail G. Boiagi (1813) and the Codex Dimonie possibly from the early 19th century.

Some scholars mention other old, little-studied written instances of Aromanian. German Byzantinist Peter Schreiner dated a small glossary of Aromanian from Epirus in a manuscript of the Chronicle of Ioannina to the 16th or 17th century based on its writing. There are also claims about an Aromanian inscription from 1426 in the St. Zacharia Church in the former village of Linotopi in Greece, but according to Hristu Cândroveanu, it was destroyed during restoration works by order of Greek priests because it was not in Greek.

== Dialects ==
Aromanian is not a homogenous linguistic entity. Its main varieties include the Pindus type, the Gramoste type, the Farsherot type, Olympus type, and the Moscopole type.

It has also several regional variants, named after places that were home to significant populations of Aromanians (Vlachs); nowadays located in Albania, North Macedonia and Greece. Examples are the Moscopole variant; the Muzachiar variant from Muzachia in central Albania; the variant of Bitola; Pelister, Malovište (Aromanian: Mulovishti), Gopeš (Aromanian: Gopish), Upper Beala; Gorna Belica (Aromanian: Beala di Suprã) near Struga, Kruševo (Aromanian: Crushuva), and the variant east of the Vardar river in North Macedonia.

== Standardization efforts ==
The Aromanian language is not standardized. However, there have been some efforts to do so. Notable examples include those of Matilda Caragiu Marioțeanu, Tiberius Cunia and Iancu Ballamaci.

== Phonology ==
Aromanian exhibits several differences from standard Romanian in its phonology, some of which are probably due to influence from Greek or Albanian. It has spirants that do not exist in Romanian, such as /θ, ð, x, ɣ/ and which are a Greek influence. Other differences are the sound /ts/, which corresponds to Romanian /tʃ/, and the sounds: /ʎ/ and /ɲ/, which exist only in local variants in Romanian. Aromanian is usually written with a version of the Latin script with an orthography that resembles both that of Albanian (in the use of digraphs such as dh, sh, and th) and Italian (in its use of c and g), along with the letter ã, used for the sounds represented in Romanian by ă and â/î. It can also be written with a modified Romanian alphabet that includes two additional letters, ń and ľ, and rarely with a version of the Greek script.

Compared to Daco-Romanian, the Aromanian varieties have preserved from Proto-Romanian the word-final glide [w] alongside [j] (in the Pindean and Gramostean types), while the Farsharot and Grabovean types have neither diphthongs nor the phoneme /ɨ/.

=== Consonants ===
		Labial	Dental/ Alveolar		Post- alveolar	Palatal	Velar	Glottal
		Labial	central	sibilant	Post- alveolar	Palatal	Velar	Glottal
Stop	voiceless	p	t			c	k	
Stop	voiced	b	d			ɟ	ɡ	
Affricate	voiceless			t͡s	t͡ʃ			
Affricate	voiced			d͡z	d͡ʒ			
Fricative	voiceless	f	θ	s	ʃ	[ç]	x	(h)
Fricative	voiced	v	ð	z	ʒ	[ʝ]	ɣ	
Nasal		m	n			ɲ		
Trill			r					
Approximant	lateral		l			ʎ		
Approximant	median					j	w	

- Central approximant consonants only occur as a result of a word-initial or intervocalic [i] and [u] when preceding another vowel.
- /x/, /ɣ/ can have allophones as [ç], [ʝ] when preceding front vowels.
- /x/, /h/ are in free variation among different dialects.

=== Vowels ===
	Front	Central	Back
Close	i	ɨ	u
Mid	e	ə	o
Open		a	

- Two vowel sounds /ɨ, ə/ are both represented by one grapheme; ã.

== Orthography ==
The Aromanian alphabet consists of 27 letters and 9 digraphs.

Letter	Name	Pronunciation (IPA)	Notes
A, a	a	/a/	–
Ã, ã	ã	/ə/, /ɨ/	–
B, b	bã	/b/	–
C, c	cã	/k/, /tʃ/, /x/	/k/ when followed by "a", "o", "u" or another consonant (/x/ in some dialects); /tʃ/ when followed by "e" or "i"
D, d	dã	/d/	–
Dh, dh	dhã	/ð/	Used only for notation in particular accents where this phoneme is present, otherwise "d" is used
Dz, dz	dzã	/dz/	–
E, e	e	/ɛ/	–
F, f	fã	/f/	–
G, g	gã	/ɡ/, /dʒ/, /ɣ/	/ɡ/ before "a", "o", "u" or another consonant (/ɣ/ in some dialects); /dʒ/ before "e" and "i"
H, h	hã	/h/	–
I, i	i	/i/	–
J, j	jã	/ʒ/	–
K, k	ca	/c/	before "e" or "i" only
L, l	lã	/l/	–
Lj, lj	lj	/ʎ/	Found in Macedonian Latin alphabet
M, m	mã	/m/	–
N, n	nã	/n/	–
Nj, nj	nj	/ɲ/	Found in Macedonian Latin alphabet
O, o	o	/o/	–
P, p	pã	/p/	–
Q, q	kiu	/k/	Used only in foreign words – "c" is normally used instead
R, r	rã	/r/	–
Rr, rr	rrã	?	Used only for notation in particular accents where this phoneme is present, otherwise "r" is used
S, s	sã	/s/	–
Sh, sh	shã	/ʃ/	–
T, t	tã	/t/	–
Th, th	thã	/θ/	Used only for notation in particular accents where this phoneme is present, otherwise "t" is used
Ts, ts	tsã	/ts/	–
U, u	u	/u/	–
V, v	vã	/v/	–
W, w	dublã vã	/w/	Used only in foreign words
X, x	csã/gzã	/ks/, /ɡz/	Same pronunciation as found in English
Y, y	i greacã	/j/, /ɣ/	/j/ before "e" and "i", /ɣ/ elsewhere; of Greek influence – cf. Greek άγιος /ˈa.ʝos/ "holy" – γ /ɡ/ is pronounced /ʝ/ in this case.
Z, z	zã	/z/	–

In addition, the digraph "gh" (/ɟ/ before "e" and "i") is used as well.

== Grammar ==
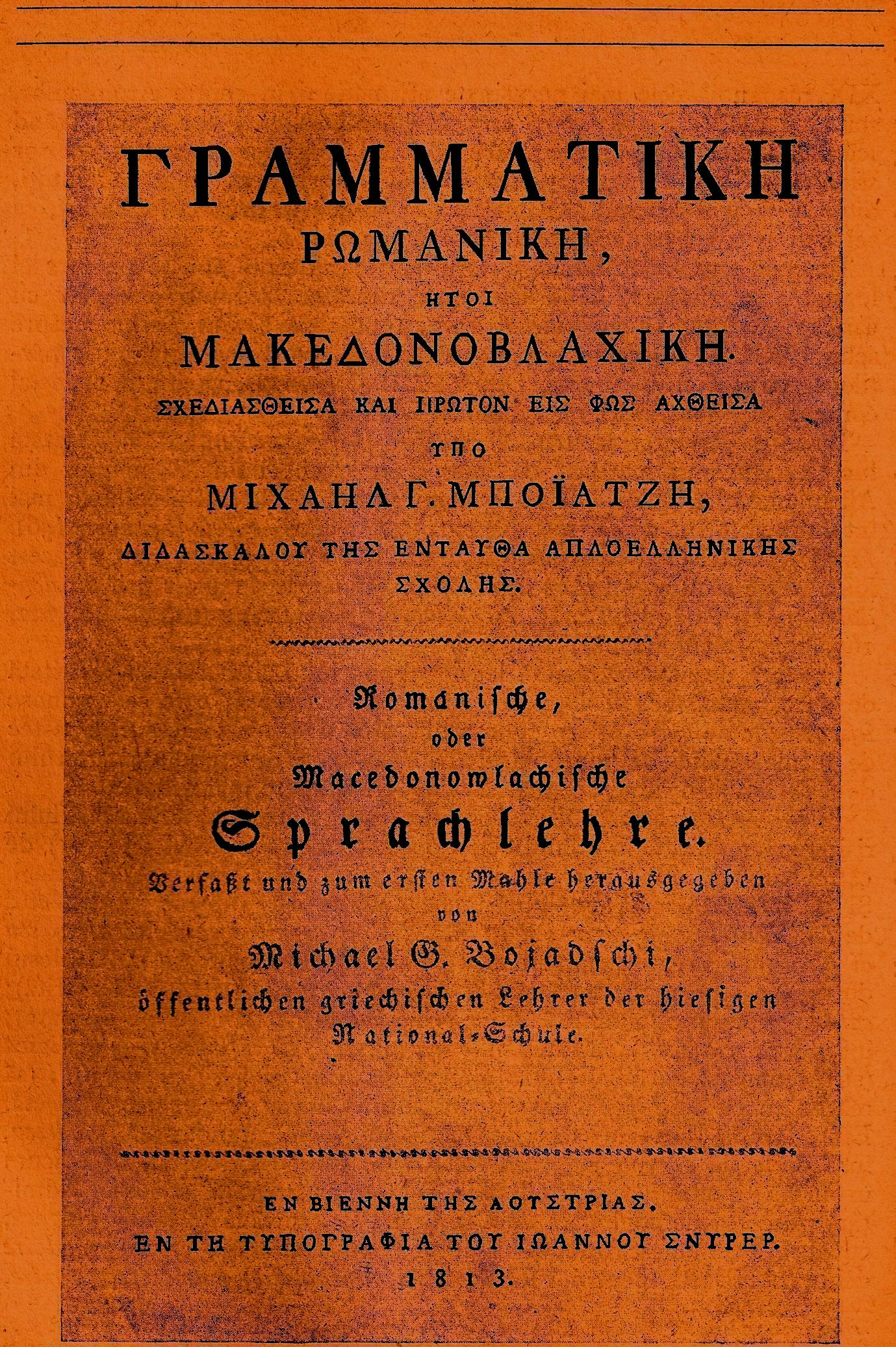
Mihail G. Boiagi's 1813 Aromanian grammar book, "Romanic or Macedono-Vlach Grammar". Written in German and Greek, it includes Aromanian texts and introduced the first writing system for Aromanian in the Latin alphabet.

The grammar and morphology are very similar to those of other Romance languages:

- It has two grammatical numbers: singular and plural (no dual).
- It is a null-subject language.
- Verbs have many conjugations, including:
  - A present tense, a preterite, an imperfect, a pluperfect and a future tense in the indicative mood, for statements of fact.
  - An imperative mood, for direct commands.
  - Three non-finite forms: infinitive, gerund, and past participle.
  - Distinct active and passive voices, as well as an impersonal passive voice.

The Aromanian language has some exceptions from the Romance languages, some of which are shared with Romanian: the definite article is a clitic particle appended at the end of the word, both the definite and indefinite articles can be inflected, and nouns are classified in three genders, with neuter in addition to masculine and feminine. Unlike other Romance languages, Aromanian lacks an infinitive form for verbs, the synthetic infinitive inherited from Latin became a noun like in Romanian (for example cântare < cantare).

=== Verbs ===
Aromanian grammar has features that distinguish it from Romanian, an important one being the complete disappearance of verb infinitives, a feature of the Balkan sprachbund. As such, the tenses and moods that, in Romanian, use the infinitive (like the future simple tense and the conditional mood) are formed in other ways in Aromanian. For the same reason, verb entries in dictionaries are given in their indicative mood, present tense, first-person-singular form.

Aromanian verbs are classified in four conjugations. The table below gives some examples and indicates the conjugation of the corresponding verbs in Romanian.

Conjugation	Aromanian (ind. pres. 1st sg.)	Romanian (ind. pres. 1st sg.)	Romanian (infinitive)	English
I	cãntu dau lucredzu	cânt dau lucrez	a cânta I a da I a lucra I	sing give work
II	ved shed rrãmãn	văd șed rămân	a vedea II a ședea II a rămâne III (or a rămânea II)	see sit stay
III	duc cunoscu ardu	duc cunosc ard	a duce III a cunoaște III a arde III	carry, lead know burn
IV	mor fug ndultsescu	mor fug îndulcesc	a muri IV a fugi IV a îndulci IV	die run away, flee sweeten

==== Future tense ====
The future tense is formed using an auxiliary invariable particle "u" or "va" and the subjunctive mood. In Romanian, declension of the future particle plus an infinitive is used.

Aromanian fãrshãrot/ grãmushtean	Romanian (archaic)	Romanian (colloquial)	Romanian (modern)	English
u s'cãntu/ va s'cãntu	va să cânt	o să cânt	voi cânta	I will sing
u s'cãnts/ va s'cãnts	va să cânți	o să cânți	vei cânta	you (sg.) will sing
u s'cãntã/ va s'cãntã	va să cânte	o să cânte	va cânta	(s)he will sing
u s'cãntãm/ va s'cãntãm	va să cântăm	o să cântăm	vom cânta	we will sing
u s'cãntatsi/ va s'cãntats	va să cântați	o să cântați	veți cânta	you (pl.) will sing
u s'cãntã/ va s'cãntã	va să cânte	o să cânte	vor cânta	they will sing

==== Pluperfect ====
Whereas in standard Romanian the pluperfect (past perfect) is formed synthetically (as in literary Portuguese), Aromanian uses a periphrastic construction with the auxiliary verb am (have) as the imperfect (aviam) and the past participle, as in Spanish and French, except that French replaces avoir (have) with être (be) for some intransitive verbs. Aromanian shares this feature with Meglenian as well as other languages in the Balkan language area.

Only the auxiliary verb inflects according to number and person (aviam, aviai, avia, aviamu, aviatu, avia), whereas the past participle does not change.

Aromanian fãrshãrot/ grãmushtean	Meglenian	Romanian	English
avia mãcatã/ avea mãcatã	vea mancat	mâncase	(he/she) had eaten
avia durnjitã/ avea durnjitã	vea durmit	dormise	(he/she) had slept

==== Gerund ====
The Aromanian gerund is applied to some verbs, but not all. These verbs are:

- 1st conjugation: acatsã (acãtsãnd), portu, lucreadzã/lucreashce, adiljã/adiljeashce.
- 2nd conjugation: armãnã, cade, poate, tatse, veade.
- 3rd conjugation: arupã, dipune, dutse, dzãse, fatsi/featse, tradzi/tradze, scrie.
- 4th conjugation: apire, doarme, hivrie, aure, pate, avde.

== Literature ==
Aromanian-language literature exists, with multiple authors, generations and works. An example is the poet Constantin Belimace, author of the Aromanian anthem Dimãndarea pãrinteascã ("The Will of the Forefathers").

== Current situation ==
=== Media ===
The Macedonian Radio Television (MRT) produces radio and television broadcasts in Aromanian.

Radio Romania International has Aromanian service producing radio shows in Aromanian.

RTSH Gjirokastra broadcasts a program in Aromanian every Saturday.

Films produced in the Aromanian language include Toma Enache's I'm Not Famous but I'm Aromanian (2013), the first in Aromanian.

=== Situation in Greece ===
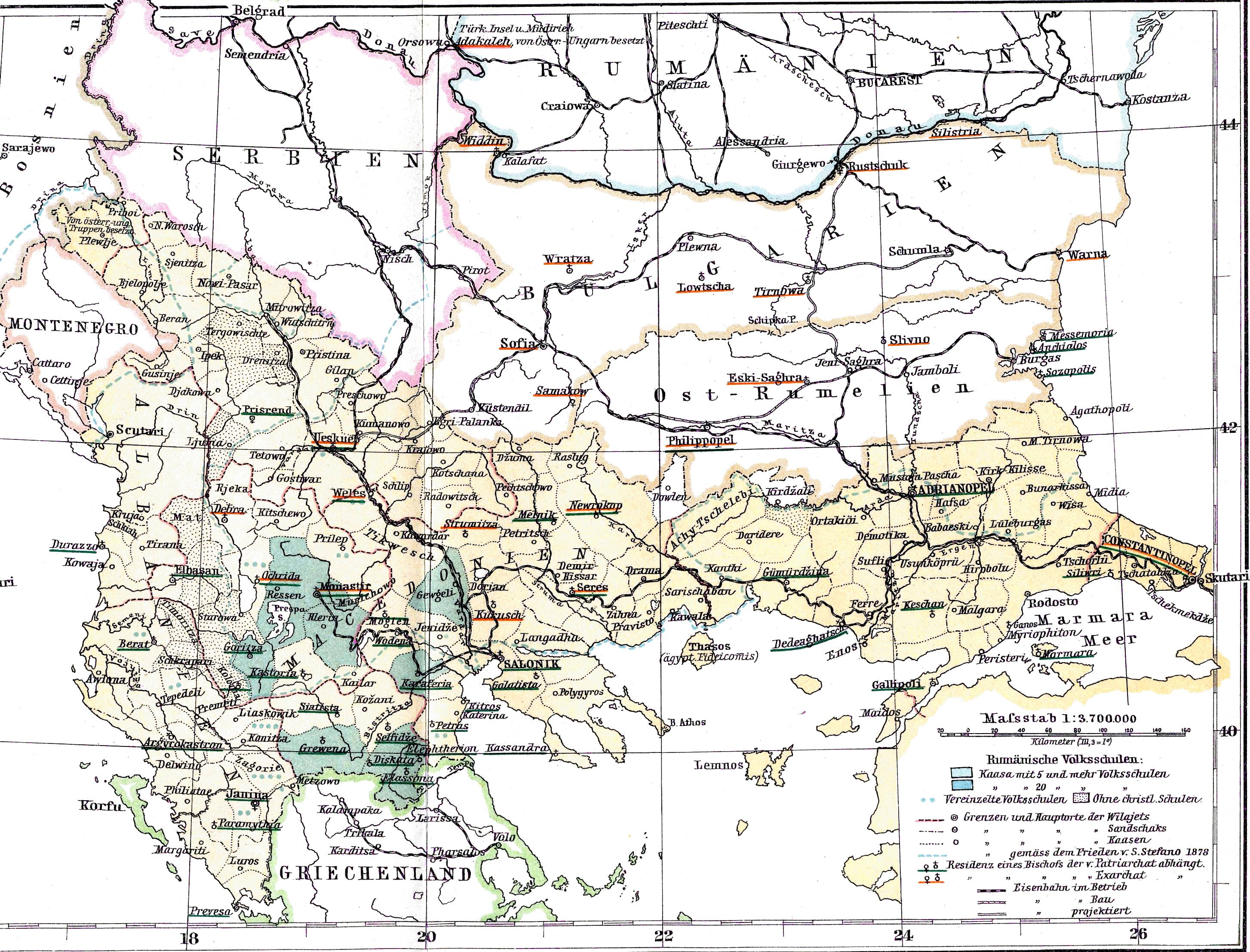
Romanian schools for Aromanians and Megleno-Romanians in the Ottoman Empire (1886)

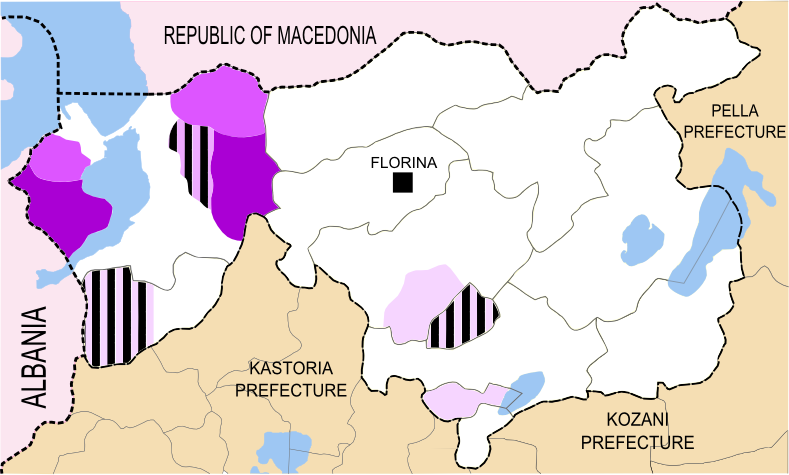
Use of the Aromanian language in the Florina Prefecture, Greece

Even before the incorporation of various Aromanian-speaking territories into the Greek state (1832, 1912), the language was subordinated to Greek, traditionally the language of education and religion in Constantinople and other prosperous urban cities. The historical studies cited below (mostly Capidan) show that especially after the fall of Moscopole (1788) the process of Hellenisation via education and religion gained a strong impetus mostly among people doing business in the cities.

The Romanian state began opening schools for the Romanian-influenced Vlachs in the 1860s, but this initiative was regarded with suspicion by the Greeks, who thought that Romania was trying to assimilate them. 19th-century travellers in the Balkans such as W. M. Leake and Henry Fanshawe Tozer noted that Vlachs in the Pindus and Macedonia were bilingual, reserving the Latin dialect for inside the home.

By 1948, the new Soviet-imposed communist regime of Romania had closed all Romanian-run schools outside Romania and, since the closure, there has been no formal education in Aromanian and speakers have been encouraged to learn and use the Greek language. This has been a process encouraged by the community itself and is not an explicit State policy. The decline and isolation of the Romanian-oriented groups was not helped by the fact that they openly collaborated with the Axis powers of Italy and Germany during the occupation of Greece in WWII. In contrast, the vast majority of Vlachs fought in the Greek resistance, including leaders like Alexandros Svolos and Andreas Tzimas, and a number of Vlach villages were destroyed by the Germans.

The issue of Aromanian-language education is a sensitive one, partly because of opposition within the Greek Vlachs community to actions leading to the introduction of the language into the education system, viewing it as an artificial distinction between them and other Greeks. For example, the former education minister, George Papandreou, received a negative response from Greek-Aromanian mayors and associations to his proposal for a trial Aromanian language education programme. The Panhellenic Federation of Cultural Associations of Vlachs expressed strong opposition to the Parliamentary Assembly of the Council of Europe's Recommendation 1333 (1997) that the tuition of Aromanian be supported so as to avoid its extinction. This recommendation was issued after pressure from the Union for Aromanian Language and Culture in Germany. On a visit to Metsovo, Epirus in 1998, Greek President Konstantinos Stephanopoulos called on Vlachs to speak and teach their language, but its decline continues.

A recent example of the sensitivity of the issue was the 2001 conviction (later overturned in the Appeals Court) to 15 months in jail of Sotiris Bletsas, a Greek Aromanian who was found guilty of "dissemination of false information" after he distributed informative material on minority languages in Europe (which included information on minority languages of Greece), produced by the European Bureau for Lesser Used Languages and financed by the European Commission. His conviction met with broad condemnation in Greece, where at least one editorial compared the situation to the suppression of Kurdish and other minority languages in Turkey and noted the irony that some prosecutors in fact came from non-Hellenophone families that had once spoken Aromanian or Turkish. Bletsas was eventually acquitted.

== Language samples ==
=== Fãrshãrot 1 ===
Tatã a nostu tsi eshti tu tser,
si ayisiascã numa a Ta,
s’yinã amirãria a Ta,
si facã vrearea a Ta,
cum tu tser, ashã sh'pisti loc.
Pãnia a nostã, atsa di cathi dzuã, dãnu sh’azã,
sh‘ yiartãni amartiili a nosti,
ashe cum li yiãrtãm sh’noi a amãrtor a noci,
sh’nu ni du la pirazmo,
ma viagljãni di atsel rãu.
Cã a Ta esti amirãria sh'puteria,
a Tatãlui shi Hiljãlui shi a Ayiului Spirit,
tora, totãna sh’tu eta a etilor.
Amin.

=== Fãrshãrot 2 ===
Tati a nost tsi esht tu tser,
s’ayiãsiaste numa a Ta,
s’zine amirãria a Ta,
si fache vrera a Ta,
cum tu tser, ashe sh'pisti loc.
Penia a noste, atsa di cathi dzue, denu sh’aze,
sh‘ yiartãni amartiãli a nosti,
ashe cum li yiãrtem sh’noi a amãrtor a noci,
sh’nu ni du la pirazmo,
ma viagãni di atsel reu.
Che a Ta esti amirãria sh'putera,
al Tati shi al Hiyiu shi al Ayiu Duh,
tora, totãna sh’tu eta a etãlu.
Amin.

=== Grãmushtean ===
Tatã a nostu, tsi eshtsã tu tseru,
s'ayiseascã numa a Ta,
s'yinã amirãriljea a Ta,
si facã vrearea a Ta,
cumu tu tseru, ashi sh'pisti locu.
Pãnea a nostã atsea di cathi dzuã dãnãu sh'adzã
sh'yiartãnã amãrtiile a noasti
ashi cum ilj yirtãmu sh'noi a amãrtoshloru a noshtsã.
Sh'nu nã du tu pirazmo,
Sh'aveagljinã di atsel arãulu.
Cã a Ta easti Amirãriljia sh'putearea
a Tatãlui shi Hiljãlui sh a Ayiului Duhu,
tora, totna sh tu eta a etilor.
Amen.

The Lord's Prayer – source

=== Universal Declaration of Human Rights ===
The Macedonian Aromanian publicist, translator and writer Dina Cuvata translated Article 1 of the Universal Declaration of Human Rights as follows:

Tuti iatsãli umineshtsã s'fac liberi shi egali la nãmuzea shi ndrepturli. Eali suntu hãrziti cu fichiri shi sinidisi shi lipseashti un cu alantu sh si poartã tu duhlu a frãtsãljiljei.

== Comparison with Romanian ==
The following text is given for comparison in Aromanian and in Romanian, with an English translation. The spelling of Aromanian is that decided at the Bitola Symposium of August 1997. The word choice in the Romanian version was such that it matches the Aromanian text, although in modern Romanian other words might have been more appropriate. The English translation is only provided as a guide to the meaning, with an attempt to keep the word order as close to the original as possible.

Aromanian	Romanian	English
Vocala easti unã son dit zburãrea a omlui, faptu cu tritsearea sonorã, libirã sh'fãrã cheadicã, a vimtului prit canalu sonor (adrat di coardili vocali shi ntreaga gurã) icã un semnu grafic cari aspuni un ahtari son.	Vocala este un sunet din vorbirea omului, făcut cu trecerea sonoră, liberă și fără piedică, a aerului prin canalul sonor (compus din coardele vocale și întreaga gură) sau un semn grafic care reprezintă un atare sunet.	The vowel is a sound in human speech, made by the sonorous, free and unhindered passing of the air through the sound channel (composed of the vocal cords and the whole mouth) or a graphic symbol corresponding to that sound.
Ashi bunãoarã, avem shasili vocali tsi s'fac cu vimtul tsi treatsi prit gurã, iu limba poati si s'aflã tu un loc icã altu shi budzãli pot si sta dishcljisi unã soe icã altã.	Așa, avem șase vocale ce se fac cu aerul ce trece prin gură, unde limba poate să se afle într-un loc sau altul și buzele pot să stea deschise într-un soi sau altul.	This way, we have six vowels that are produced by the air passing through the mouth, where the tongue can be in one place or another and the lips can be opened in one way or another.
Vocalili pot s'hibã pronuntsati singuri icã deadun cu semivocali i consoani.	Vocalele pot să fie pronunțate singure sau împreună cu semivocale sau consoane.	The vowels can be pronounced alone or together with semivowels or consonants.

== Common words and phrases ==
English	Aromanian
Aromanian (person)	(m.) Armãn/ rrãmãn, (f.) armãnã/ rrãmãnã
Aromanian (language)	Limba armãneascã/ limba rrãmãneascã; armãneashti/ armãneashte / armãneashci / armãneashce / rrãmãneshti
Good day!	Bunã dzua!
What's your name?	Cum ti chiamã? (informal)
How old are you?	Di cãtsi anji esht?
How are you?	Cumu hits? (formal) Cumu eshti?/ Cumu eshci? (informal)
What are you doing?	Tsi fats?/ Tsi adari? (popular)
Goodbye!	S'nã videmu cu ghine!/ Ghini s'ni videmu!/ Ghini s'ni vãdem!
Bye!	S'nã avdzãmu ghiniatsa!/ Sã s'avdzãm buniatsa!
Please.	Vã plãcãrsescu. (formal) Ti plãcãrsescu. (informal)
Sorry.	S'mi hãrãdzesht.
Thank you.	Haristo.
Yes.	Ye/ E.
No.	Nu.
I don't understand.	Nu adukiescu/ Nu akicãsescu.
I don't know.	Nu shtiu/ Nu shciu.
Where's the bathroom?	Yu esti tualetu? / Yu easti toaletlu?/ Yu easte tualetu?
Do you speak English?	Zburats / Grits – anglikiashti? / anglicheashce?
I am a student.	Mini est / estu un student/ Mine escu un student.
I am a good person.	Mini est / estu un om bun
You are beautiful.	Eshti mushat(ã)/ Eshci mushat(ã)/ Hi mushat(ã)/ Esht mushat(e).

== See also ==
- Aromanian alphabet
- Common Romanian
- Substrate in Romanian
- Balkan sprachbund
- Origin of the Romanians
- Thraco-Roman
- Daco-Roman
- Eastern Romance languages
- Romance languages
- Legacy of the Roman Empire
- Latin-Greek connection
