= Brad Vee Johnson =

Romanian-based American singer

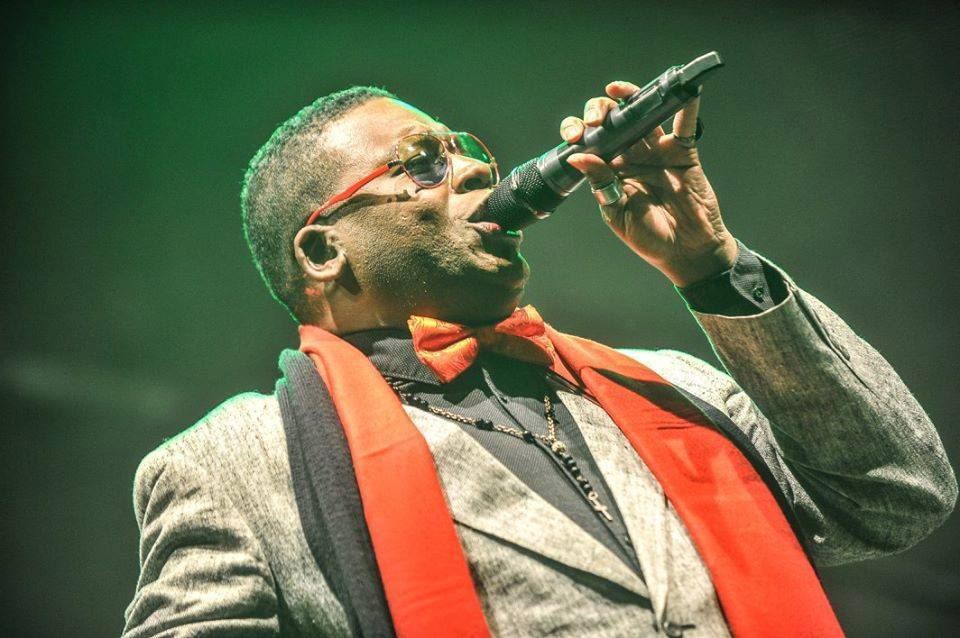
- Johnson on stage, 2015
- Born: 6 July 1961 (age 65); New York City, New York, USA
- Education: New York University
- Occupations: Singer and Vocalist
- Years active: 1983–present

Brad Viktor Johnson, better known by his stage name Brad Vee Johnson, is a Romanian-based American singer from New York City. He rose to prominence after relocating to Stockholm, performing lead roles in The Buddy Holly Story, Miss Saigon, and Show Boat. Johnson has been the Dean of the International Medical University of Natural Education (IMUNE) since 2013 and as the acting President of the International Register of Therapists Circle of Excellence (IRTCOE). He currently resides in Bucharest.

== Early life ==
Born and raised in New York City, his love for music and singing was formed at an early age by the influence of his mother, Deloris Aida Johnson, singing in the Kingdom hall of Jehovah's Witnesses and his father William Edward Johnson, an elder and jazz pianist. He studied music at the High School for the Performing Arts (FAME school) under Dorothy McDaniels and studied voice with the jazz singer Marie Blake. Blake offered him his first public singing appearance at the now defunct Five Oaks Piano Bar and Supper Club, once located on Grove Street in Greenwich Village, New York City. He also studied acting at HB Studios with William Hickey, actor and coach.

== Career ==
After graduating from New York University, he relocated to Europe in 1986 where he took up residence in Stockholm, Sweden. There he continued his singing career and furthered it by performing in various musicals such as Jesus Christ Superstar at Østre Gasværk Teater in Copenhagen, Denmark under the direction of Lars Kaalund, Show Boat, Company, Miss Saigon in Malmö, The Buddy Holly Story at Göta Lejon in Stockholm, and The Lion King in Scandinavia, Germany and the Netherlands. In 1992 he met Sheyla Bonnick, founding member of Boney M with whom he continues to tour to this day under the Sounds of Boney M Formation. In 1994, he also successfully started Sweden's premiere gospel choir One Voice, together with singer and friend Blossom Tainton.

He relocated to Romania in 2004 after a concert at the then called Tutankamon (now Obsession) in Cluj-Napoca, Romania where he was immediately offered a record contract with Roton Records. He recorded two house/club singles with Romanian composer DJ Raoul. During his time in Romania he organized a number of concerts in order to raise awareness on Romanian youth suffering from HIV/AIDS and the stigma it may carry. He has since relocated to Bucharest, where he is currently based, performing both locally and internationally with his gospel group, jazz and blues band, and under the formation of the Sounds of Boney M with Sheyla Bonnick. He earned his PhD in Sociology in 2012 based on his work on researching and shedding light on the inequality present in the modern education system.

== Stage roles ==
Year	Title	Role	Notes
1985	Little Shop of Horrors	Plant	Off-Broadway
1989	The Phantom of the Opera	Chorus	
1993	The Buddy Holly Story	MC	
1997–98	Miss Saigon	John	Apollo Theater
1999	The Magic Flute	Monostatos	
1999	The West Pier (Play)	Abad	Helsingborg City Theater
2000	Show Boat	Joe	Nørrebros Theater
2001	Jesus Christ Superstar	Herod	
2003	Miss Saigon	John	In Malmö
2004	The Lion King (musical)	Mufasa	In Hamburg
2005	The Lion King (musical)	Mufasa	In Amsterdam

Apart from musicals, he was also the narrator for the 2013 film I'm Not Famous but I'm Aromanian.
