= I'm Not Famous but I'm Aromanian =

- Nu hiu faimos ama hiu armãn (Aromanian); Nu sunt faimos dar sunt aromân (Romanian)
- Directed by: Toma Enache
- Written by: Adrian Conerth; Carmen Dîrvariu; Toma Enache
- Starring: Toma Enache; Linda Croitoru; Lică Gherghilescu-Tanașoca
- Production company: La Steaua Film Studios
- Distributed by: MediaPro Distribution
- Release date: 25 October 2013
- Running time: 108 minutes
- Country: Romania
- Language: Aromanian
- Budget: €300,000

I'm Not Famous but I'm Aromanian (Aromanian: Nu hiu faimos ama hiu armãn; Romanian: Nu sunt faimos dar sunt aromân) is a 2013 Romanian comedy drama and romance film which was the first film in the Aromanian language.

The movie tells the story of Toni Caramușat, a famous film director, fascinated by the idea of finding the 13th fundamental truth about the Aromanians. First 12 truths were gathered by linguist Matilda Caragiu Marioțeanu in her Dodecalogue of the Aromanians. According to myth, the 13th truth is held by Armãnamea, the last descendant of this people. In the movie, Toni goes on dates with young women from all over the world, in hope of finding both the truth and his soul mate.

The film won the "Maestrale Unica" award, a medal by the Italian Parliament, and the distinction of the European Parliament for best representation of a linguistic minority in Europe at the 2013 Babel Film Festival.

== Cast ==
- Toma Enache as Toni Caramușat
- Linda Croitoru as Armãnamea
- Lică Gherghilescu-Tanașoca as Tanasi Caramușat (father)
- Teodora Calagiu Garofil as Haida
- Rudy Rosenfeld as Iorgu
- Sorin Șaguna as Ianis
- Camelia Șapera as Tana
- Nicu Baturi as capitain Tega
- Anca Manolescu as judge
- Constantin Florescu as airplane pilot
- Alina Manțu as Teodora
- Geo Dinescu as Vanghea
- Mara Panaitescu as herself
- Aurica Piha as Hrisa
- Ana Donosa as Kira
- Anca Zamfir as Marusa
- Vasile Topa as mayor
- Brad Vee Johnson as narrator
- Ileana Popovici as Iorgu's wife
