= Matilda Caragiu Marioțeanu =

Romanian linguist (1927–2009)

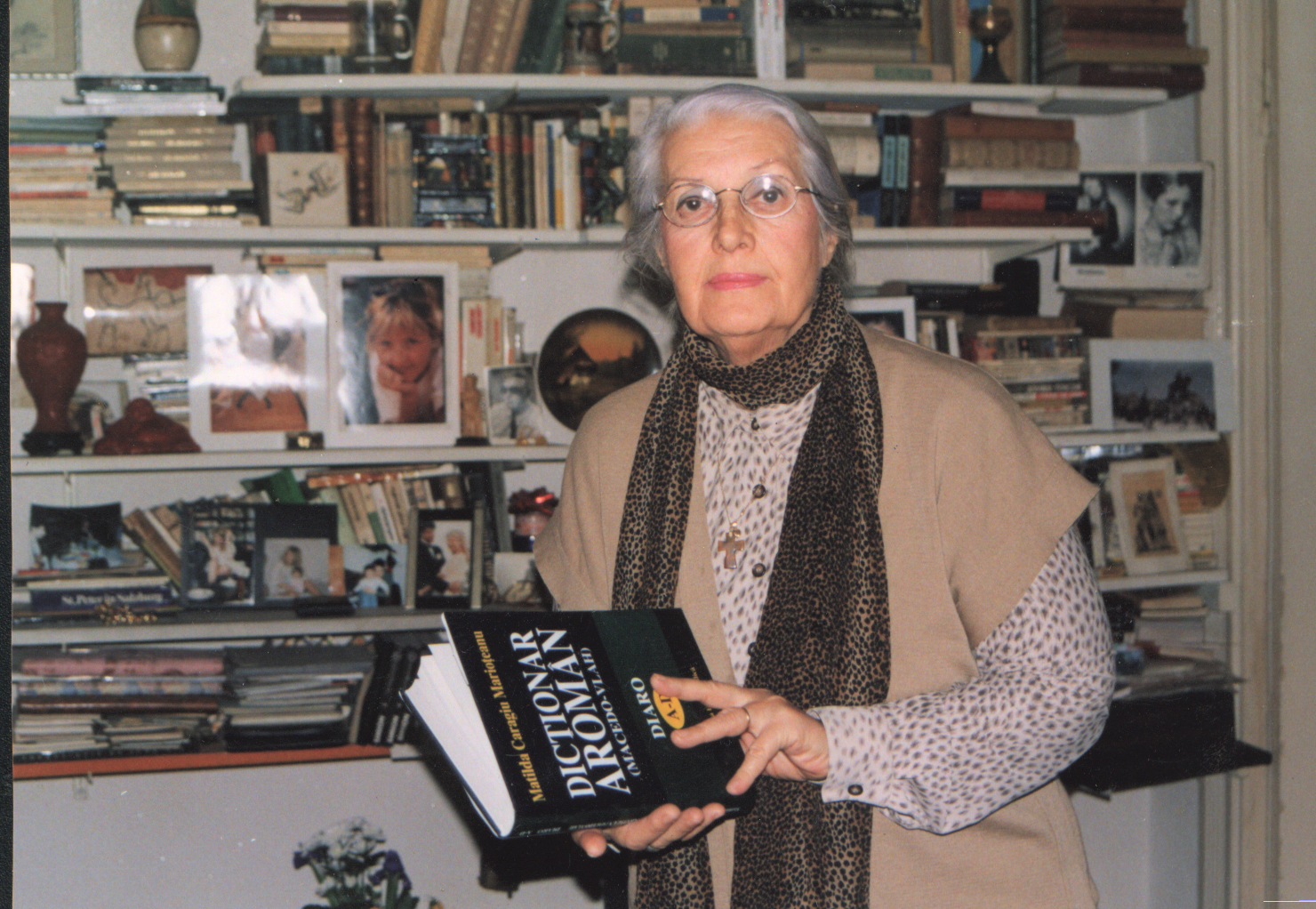
- Born: 20 July 1927; Argos Orestiko, Greece
- Died: 11 March 2009 (aged 81); Bucharest, Romania
- Occupations: Linguist, university professor
- Relatives: Toma Caragiu (brother); Geta Caragiu (sister)
- Awards: National Order of Merit in the "Commander" rank (2000)

Academic background
- Education: University of Bucharest
- Thesis: Fonomorfologie aromână. Studiu de dialectologie structurală (1968)

Matilda Caragiu Marioțeanu (20 July 1927 – 11 March 2009; Aromanian: Matilda Caragiu Mariotseanu) was a Romanian linguist. She studied in the University of Bucharest, where she became a professor, having also taught at the University of Salzburg and the Goethe University Frankfurt as an invited professor. Caragiu Marioțeanu was the sister of actor Toma Caragiu and sculptor Geta Caragiu.

Caragiu Marioțeanu published a multitude of works about the Romanian and Aromanian languages as well as about the Aromanians in general, having been one herself. Her Dodecalogue of the Aromanians played an important role in the plot of I'm Not Famous but I'm Aromanian (2013), the first film in Aromanian. She also collaborated in the publication of several manuals for learning Romanian, translated Aromanian fairy tales and stories into Romanian and wrote two volumes of Aromanian verses. For her research, Caragiu Marioțeanu became a titular member of the Romanian Academy and received the National Order of Merit in 2000.

== Biography ==
=== Early life and education ===
Matilda Caragiu Marioțeanu was born on 20 July 1927 in Argos Orestiko (Aromanian: Hrupishte), in Greece. Of Aromanian parents, she had two siblings, actor Toma Caragiu and sculptor Geta Caragiu. In 1928, she and her family moved together with some forty other Aromanian families to Sarsânlar (now Zafirovo, Bulgaria), in Romania's Southern Dobruja, where Caragiu Marioțeanu went to primary school. She and her family were exiled from Southern Dobruja following the region's return to Bulgaria in 1940, after which they moved to Oltenița, Bacău, Ploiești and, in 1947, Bucharest. Caragiu Marioțeanu went to high school in Silistra, Bacău and Ploiești. She graduated from the Faculty of Letters of the University of Bucharest in 1951.

=== Career and profession ===
Starting her career while still a student in 1950, Caragiu Marioțeanu was a professor in several faculties (in the Faculty of Letters, the Faculty of Philology and the Faculty of Romanian Language and Literature) of the University of Bucharest until her retirement in 1982. She taught courses and seminars on the history of the Romanian language, historical grammar, general dialectology and that of several Eastern Romance languages, contemporary Romanian and Romanian for foreigners. Caragiu Marioțeanu also taught as an invited professor at the University of Salzburg in Austria from 1970 to 1973 and at the Goethe University Frankfurt in West Germany in 1983.

She obtained a doctorate in 1967 with her thesis Fonomorfologie aromână. Studiu de dialectologie structurală ("Aromanian Phono-Morphology. Study of Structural Dialectology"), which was published the next year. It is a study carried out from 1951 to 1960 on the way of speaking Aromanian of her own family following changes in grammar structure, lexicon and phonetics they experienced as a result of contact with Romanians.

=== Research and publications ===
Caragiu Marioțeanu was a prolific academic and researcher. She published in 1962 a study on the Aromanian Missal, an old Aromanian-language liturgical manuscript, including a glossary and a philological study, for which she was awarded by the Ministry of Education. In 1975, she published Compendiu de dialectologie română (nord și sud-dunăreană) ("Compendium of (Northern and Southern Danubian) Romanian Dialectology"), for which she received the Timotei Cipariu Award from the Romanian Academy. She collaborated in the works Istorie a limbii române ("History of the Romanian Language") and Crestomația romanică ("Romance Chrestomathy"). Caragiu Marioțeanu also published Dicționar aromân (macedo-vlah), DIARO ("Aromanian (Macedo-Vlach) Dictionary, DIARO") in 1997 and Toma Caragiu – Ipostaze ("Toma Caragiu – Hypostases") in memory of her deceased brother in 2003.

Remarkable among Caragiu Marioțeanu's work is her 1993 Dodecalog al aromânilor sau 12 adevăruri incontestabile, istorice și actuale, asupra aromânilor și asupra limbii lor ("Dodecalogue of the Aromanians or 12 Indisputable Truths, Historical and Current, About the Aromanians and About Their Language"), which includes her personal views and beliefs on the Aromanians and their language. First published in a magazine and later as a volume of its own, it has been translated into English and French. The plot of the first Aromanian-language film, I'm Not Famous but I'm Aromanian (2013), directed by Toma Enache, is based on protagonist Toni Caramușat's search for a thirteenth truth on the Aromanians, with the previous twelve being those constituting Caragiu Marioțeanu's Dodecalogue.

Caragiu Marioțeanu collaborated in the publication of several manuals for learning Romanian. These are Cours de langue roumaine. Introduction a l'étude du roumain a l'usage des étudiants étrangers (1967, 1972, 1978; in French), A Course in Contemporary Romanian. An Introduction to the Study of Romanian (1969, 1980; in English) and Rumänisch für Sie. Ein moderner Sprachkurs für Erwachsene (first volume published in 1976 and the second in 1979, with both re-published in 1993 and 1996; in German). She also translated Aromanian fairy tales and stories into Romanian and wrote two volumes of Aromanian verses.

Caragiu Marioțeanu became a corresponding member of the Romanian Academy on 12 November 1993, being elected as a titular member in 2004. On 1 December 2000, she was awarded the National Order of Merit in the rank of "Commander" by the President of Romania Emil Constantinescu "for special merits in the development of science and culture". Caragiu Marioțeanu died on 11 March 2009 in her house in Bucharest.
