= Monastery of the Holy Apostles, Kleino =

Eastern Orthodox monastery in Kleino, Greece

Monastery of the Holy Apostles
- Ιερά Μονή Αγίων Αποστόλων (Greek)
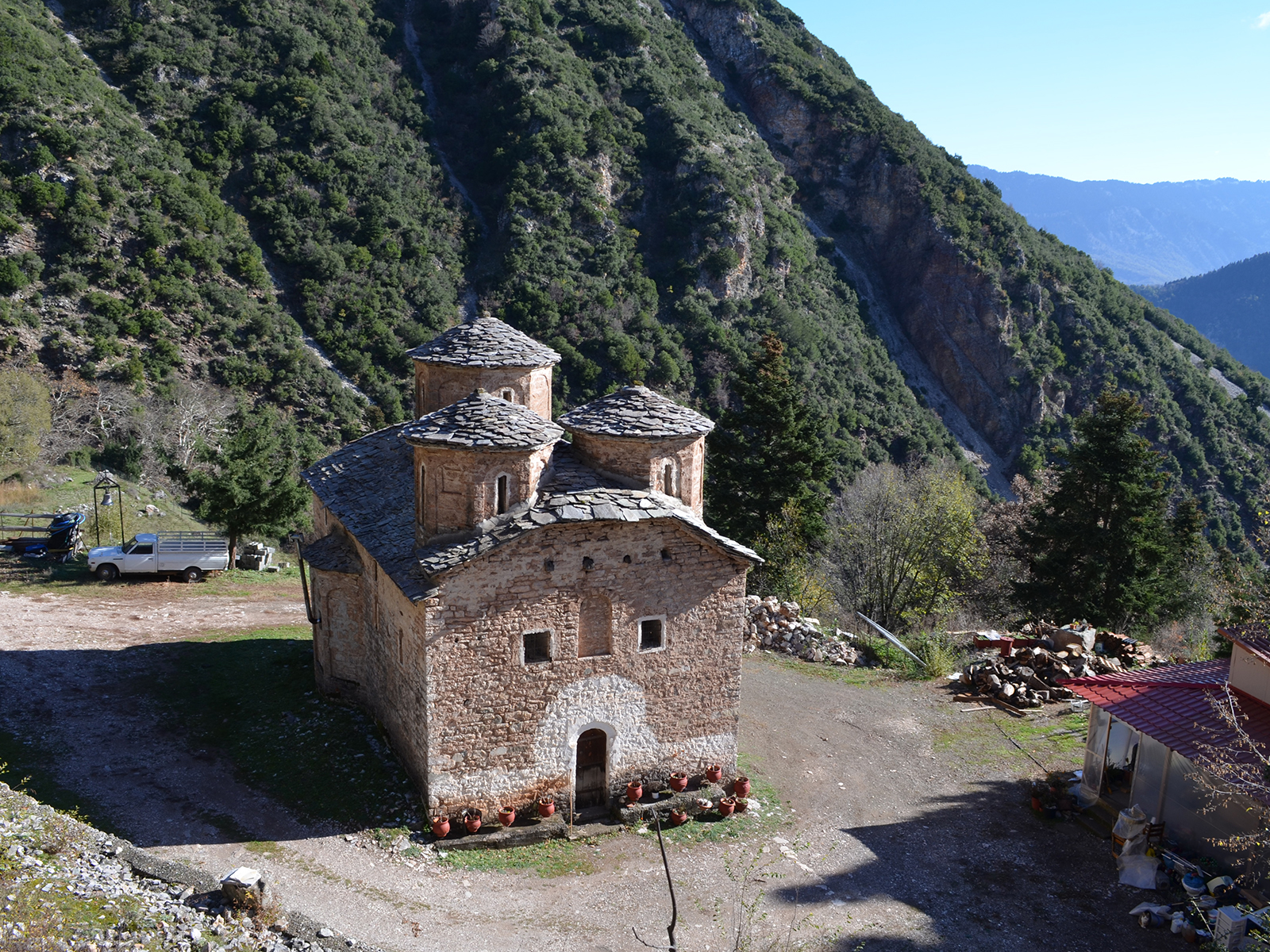
- Image of the monastery

- Location within Greece
- Interactive map of Monastery of the Holy Apostles

Monastery information
- Denomination: Eastern Orthodoxy
- Established: Mid-18th century

Site
- Location: Kleino, Greece
- Coordinates: 39°40′26.106″N 21°27′21.773″E

The Monastery of the Holy Apostles (Greek: Ιερά Μονή Αγίων Αποστόλων, romanized: Ierá Moní Agíon Apostólon) is an Eastern Orthodox monastery in Kleino, Greece. It is located 2 kilometres (1.2 miles) northeast of the settlement itself, on a plateau of difficult accessibility. The monastery was built approximately in the middle of the 18th century, its construction having been overseen by bishop Stagi Paisios. It is built in the style of the monasteries of Mount Athos.

The monastery features one of the oldest known inscriptions in the Aromanian language, which is the following: Intrā mbāsiareka ku multā pāvrie, triamburā lundalui Maria kumnikatura, fokulu akshi shi kolasi tra skaki, meaning "Enter the church in awe, tremble as you receive the communion of Mary, to escape fire and hell". It is written using the Greek alphabet and it is estimated that it was made around the year 1780. This prayer is located on the interior of the arch of the entrance to the monastery and it is also written in Ancient and Modern Greek. Its author was St. Zosimas.
