= Kleino =

Village in Thessaly, Greece

Kleino Κλεινό
- Municipal unit
- Location within the regional unit

- Location within Greece
- Coordinates: 39°40′N 21°27′E
- Country: Greece
- Administrative region: Thessaly
- Regional unit: Trikala
- Municipality: Meteora

Area
  - Municipal unit: 180.7 km^{2} (69.8 sq mi)

Population (2021)
  - Municipal unit: 1,197
  - Municipal unit density: 6.624/km^{2} (17.16/sq mi)
  - Community: 328
- Time zone: UTC+2 (EET)
  - Summer (DST): UTC+3 (EEST)
- Vehicle registration: ΤΚ

Kleino (Greek: Κλεινό; formerly Klinovos, Aromanian: Clinova) is an Aromanian village and a former municipality in the Trikala regional unit, Thessaly, Greece. Since the 2011 local government reform it is part of the municipality Meteora, of which it is a municipal unit. The municipal unit has an area of 180.728 km^{2}. Population 1,197 (2021).

The Monastery of the Holy Apostles is located in Kleino. It contains a unique old inscription in the Aromanian language.

== History ==
Based on the codex of the monastery of Varlaam in Meteora, the village seems to have existed already in the 10th century. The settlement is mentioned as Klinovista in a document of 1340, so it is a settlement of the Byzantine era. In the Turkish census of 1454/55, as Klinova, it is mentioned among the honorary Trikala spahs. In Turkish sources it is referred to as Klinovos, Klinovon, Klinovous and also as Klinovopolis.

The settlements that made up Kleinovo seem to have been inhabited throughout the Turkish occupation and it is also mentioned as the place of origin of the Vlach-speaking Patriarch of Constantinople, Matthew II (1596-1602). He also mentions the Bishop of Stagios, Silivria and later of Philippou as the place of origin of Paisios II (1740-1822). During the time that Paisios was bishop of Stagios, the church of the monastery of the Holy Apostles, where we find his autobiography frescoed, as well as the churches of Agia Paraskevi and Aghios Georgios, were hagiographed under his care. In addition, the Patriarch of Alexandria Jerome Ierotheos I and the revolutionary fighter, charioteer of the region of Aspropotamos, Gregorios Liakatas (1795-1825), descended from the village.

== Notable people ==
- Hierotheus I of Alexandria (?–1845), Greek Orthodox Patriarch of Alexandria
- Grigoris Liakatas (1795–1826), fighter and klepht
