= Aromanian alphabet =

Variant of the Latin script used for writing the Aromanian language

The Aromanian alphabet (Aromanian: Alfabetu armãnescu/rrãmãnescu) is a variant of the Latin script used for writing the Aromanian language. The current version of the alphabet was suggested in 1997 at the Symposium for Standardisation of the Aromanian Writing System in Bitola, Republic of North Macedonia and revised in 1999. It was then adopted by most Aromanian writers in North Macedonia, Serbia, Albania, Bulgaria and Romania.

== Alphabet ==
The alphabet consists of several letters and digraphs. The Aromanian alphabet is since 1997 standardized.

Letter	Name	Pronunciation (IPA)	Notes
A, a	a	/a/	–
Ã, ã	ã	/ə/, /ɨ/ (sometimes)	–
B, b	bã	/b/	–
C, c	cã	/k/, /tʃ/, /x/	/k/ when followed by "a", "o", "u" or a consonant; (/x/ in some dialects), /tʃ/ when followed by "e" or "i"
D, d	dã	/d/	–
Dh, dh	dhã	/ð/	Used only for notation in particular accents where this phoneme is present, otherwise "d" is used
Dz, dz	dzã	/dz/	–
E, e	e	/ɛ/	–
F, f	fã	/f/	–
G, g	gã	/ɡ/, /dʒ/, /ɣ/	/ɡ/ before "a", "o", "u" or a consonant (/ɣ/ in some dialects), /dʒ/ before "e" and "i"
H, h	hã	/h/	–
I, i	i	/i/	–
J, j	jã	/ʒ/	–
K, k	ca	/c/	before "e" or "i" only
L, l	lã	/l/	–
Lj, lj	ljã	/ʎ/	Found in Macedonian Latin alphabet
M, m	mã	/m/	–
N, n	nã	/n/	–
Nj, nj	njã	/ɲ/	Found in Macedonian Latin alphabet
O, o	o	/o/	–
P, p	pã	/p/	–
Q, q	kiu	/k/	Used only in foreign words – "c" is normally used instead
R, r	rã	/r/	–
Rr, rr	rrã	/r/	Used only for notation in particular accents where this phoneme is present, otherwise "r" is used
S, s	sã	/s/	–
Sh, sh	shã	/ʃ/	–
T, t	tã	/t/	–
Th, th	thã	/θ/	Used only for notation in particular accents where this phoneme is present, otherwise "t" is used
Ts, ts	tsã	/ts/	–
U, u	u	/u/, /ʷ/	For /ʷ/, "ù" may be used
V, v	vã	/v/	–
W, w	dublã vã	/w/	Used only in foreign words
X, x	csã/gzã	/ks/, /ɡz/	Same pronunciation as found in English
Y, y	i greacã	/j/, /ɣ/	/j/ before "e" and "i", /ɣ/ elsewhere
Z, z	zã	/z/	–

In addition, the digraph "gh" (/ɟ/ before "e" and "i") is used as well.

== History ==
Prior to adoption of the current writing system, Aromanian had been written using a wide variety of scripts, including Greek and Cyrillic.

With the standardisation of Romanian, a language closely related to Aromanian, and the opening of Romanian schools in the southern Balkans, the Romanian alphabet was used to write Aromanian.

In the 1980s and 1990s, there was a renewed push for creating a standard writing system. Aromanian began being taught in schools in North Macedonia, Albania, and Romania. Members of various Aromanian societies around the world held conferences every few years, all with the main goal of promoting a standard Aromanian alphabet.

Besides the standardized alphabet, there still exist other variants. Those based on the Latin alphabet often use the letters â, ă, î, ș, ț (as does Romanian) and also ḑ, ľ, ń. In Greece, Aromanian is usually written using the Greek script.

== See also ==
- Cyrillic alphabet
- Greek alphabet
- Istro-Romanian alphabet
- Megleno-Romanian alphabet
- Romanian alphabet
