= Toma Enache =

Romanian film director

- Born: 1 November 1970 (age 55); Mihail Kogălniceanu, Romania
- Occupation: Film director

Toma Enache (born 1 November 1970) is a Romanian film director and actor. Being of Aromanian ethnicity, he directed I'm Not Famous but I'm Aromanian, the first film in the Aromanian language. Enache has also directed two other films. Activities of his outside of the world of cinema are related to poetry and theatre.

== Biography ==
Toma Enache was born on 1 November 1970 in Mihail Kogălniceanu, Romania. He is an ethnic Aromanian, and speaks Aromanian fluently. He has taught the language to his son Anton, whom he had with his wife Elena, a Romanian from Maramureș.

After ending his secondary education in Constanța, Enache inscribed to the Faculty of Zootechnics of the University of Agronomic Sciences and Veterinary Medicine of Bucharest, as he liked animals. But since he also liked poetry, which in turn pushed him closer to theatre, he also entered the Faculty of Theatre of the Caragiale National University of Theatre and Film. Thus, Enache would graduate from the former in 1996 and from the latter in 1997. Following this, Enache made several theatrical performances in Romania and abroad, all in the Aromanian language. Enache has also published three volumes of personal poems and has translated several poems and theatrical plays into Aromanian.

Enache directed the film I'm Not Famous but I'm Aromanian, released in 2013. This was the first film in the Aromanian language, and it received several awards. Motivated by this, he directed another film dedicated to the Aromanians, Aromanians, from the Famous Manaki to I'm Not Famous, from 2015. In 2019, he directed Between Pain and Amen, the first film dedicated to the Pitești Experiment of the communist-era Pitești Prison. Enache was also among the acting cast of Nicolae Mărgineanu's 2019 film The Cardinal.
